= Fasti Capitolini =

List of the annual magistrates at Rome down to the time of Augustus

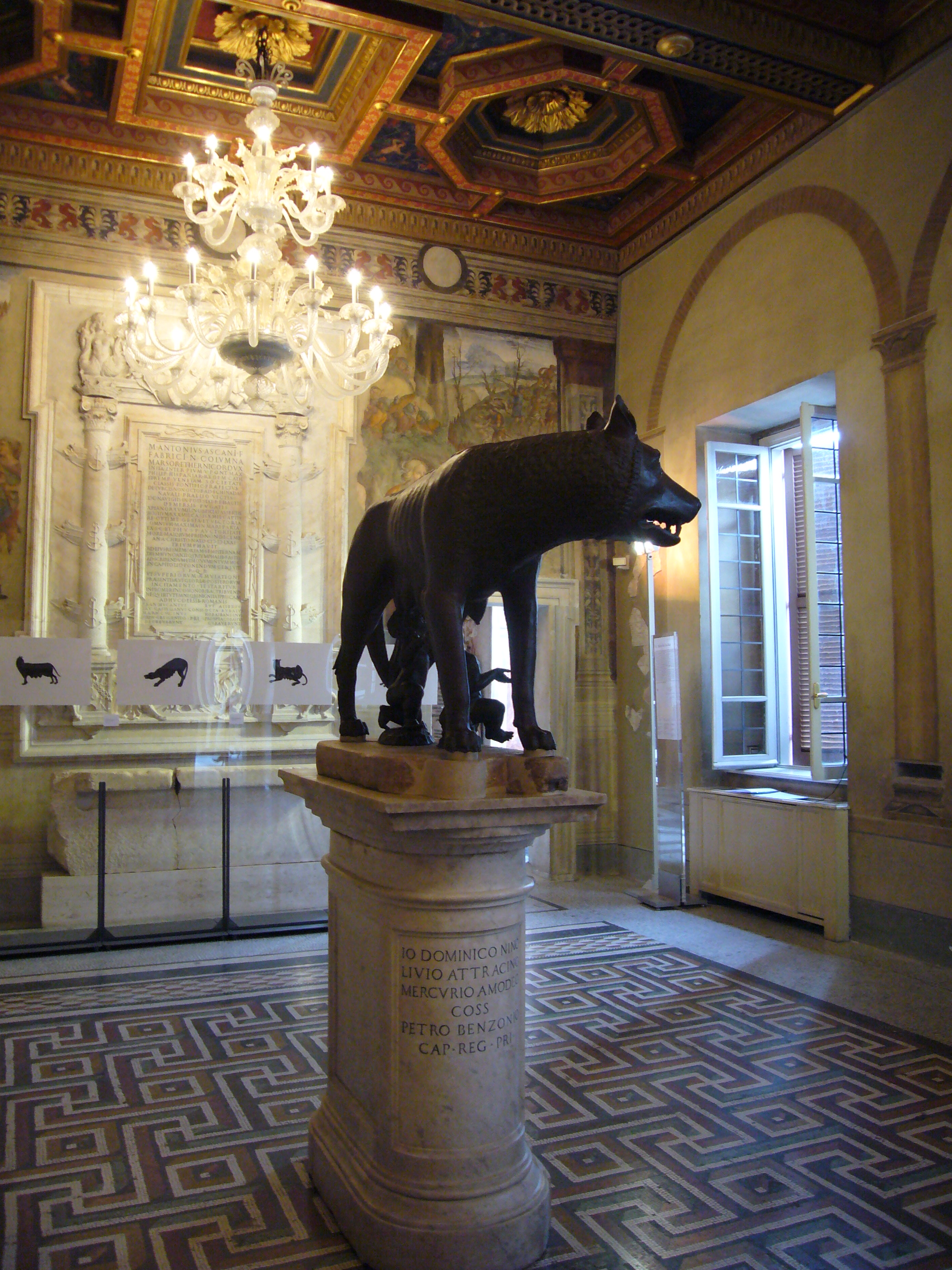
The Sala della Lupa in the Palazzo dei Conservatori, with the Capitoline Wolf in the foreground, and behind her an entablature of the Fasti Capitolini, one of several in the hall.

The Fasti Capitolini, or Capitoline Fasti, are a list of the chief magistrates of the Roman Republic, extending from the early fifth century BC down to the reign of Augustus, the first Roman emperor. Together with similar lists found at Rome and elsewhere, they form part of a chronology referred to as the Fasti Annales, Fasti Consulares, or Consular Fasti, or occasionally just the fasti.

The Capitoline Fasti were originally engraved on marble tablets erected in the Roman forum. The main portions were discovered in a fragmentary condition, and removed from the forum in 1546, as ancient structures were dismantled to produce material for the construction of St. Peter's Basilica. They were brought to the Palazzo dei Conservatori on the adjacent Capitoline Hill, where they remain as part of the collection of the Capitoline Museums, together with other Roman antiquities. Together with the histories of writers such as Livy and Dionysius of Halicarnassus, the Capitoline Fasti form one of the primary sources for Roman chronology.

== History ==
The term fasti originally referred to calendars published by the pontifices, indicating the days on which business could be transacted (fasti) and those on which it was prohibited for religious reasons (nefasti). These calendars frequently included lists of the annual magistrates. In many ancient cultures, the most common way to refer to individual years was by the names of the presiding magistrates. The annually-elected consuls were the eponymous magistrates at Rome, and so lists of the consuls going back many years were useful for dating historical events. Over time such lists also became known as fasti.

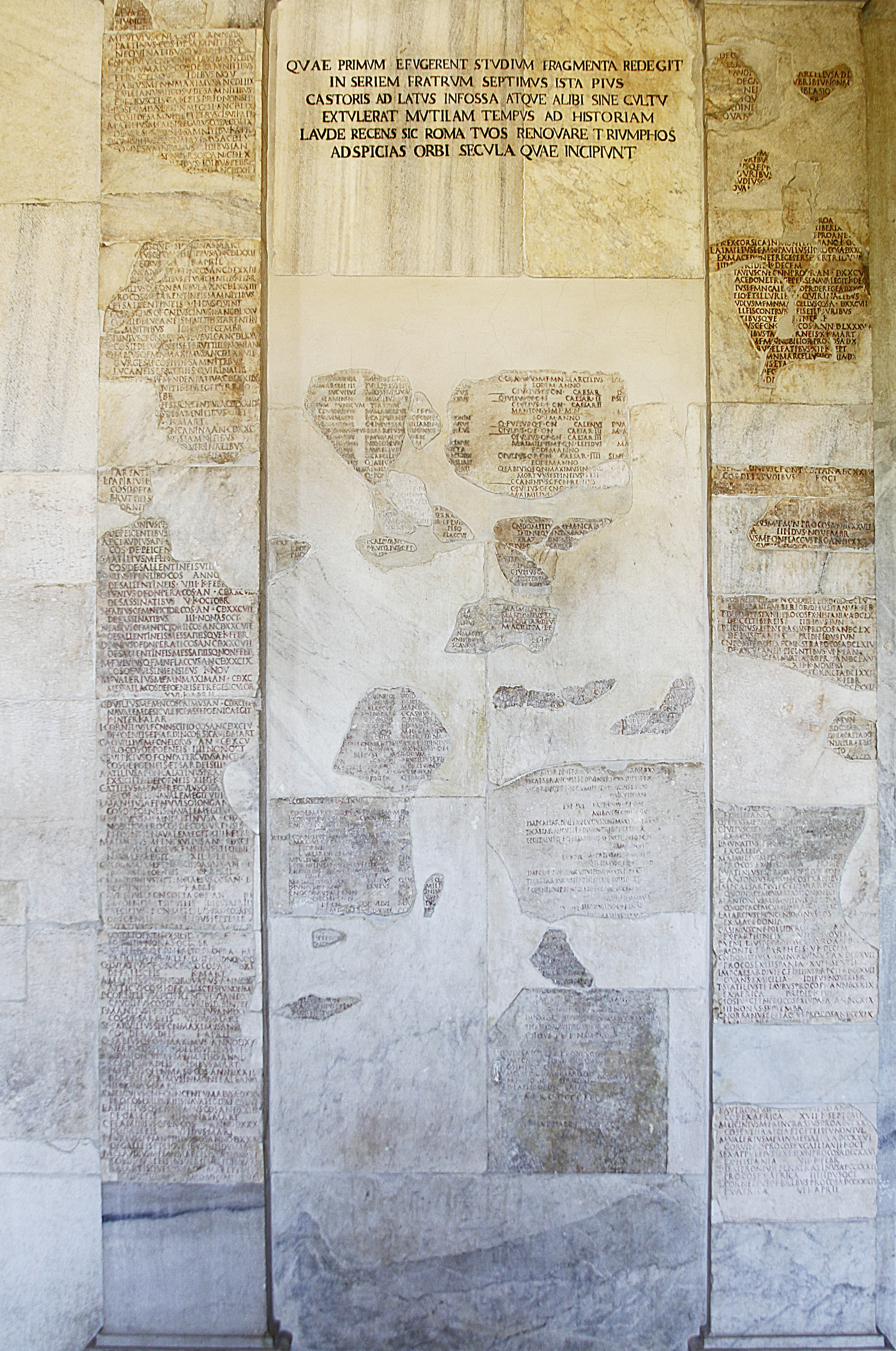
Re-assembled fragments of the Fasti Capitolini, in the Palazzo dei Conservatori on the Capitoline Hill. The large inscription at top is a modern dedication.

The Capitoline Fasti are thought to have been engraved in one of two places: first, the wall of the Regia, originally the residence or official seat of the Roman kings, and later the official residence of the Pontifex Maximus, the chief priest of Rome, between 36 and 30 BC. The Annales Maximi, records of Roman history from the earliest period to the late second century BC, and one of the sources consulted by ancient historians, were stored in the Regia. Alternatively, the Fasti Capitolini may have been inscribed on the Arch of Augustus, in 18 BC. In either case, they were subsequently continued down to the death of Augustus in AD 14.

In 1540, Pope Paul III authorized the recycling of stone from the forum for the construction of St. Peter's Basilica. The structures in the part of the forum where the fasti were discovered were dismantled between August 15 and September 14, 1546. Some of the stone was sold to stonecutters to be reused in the construction, while some was sold to lime burners to be used for cement. The work was carried out by a company of local quarrymen, with little regard for the archaeological value of the ancient structures, but the scholars Onofrio Panvinio and Pirro Ligorio observed the demolition, and noticed a portion of the fasti still embedded between pilasters in a wall. Other portions were found scattered nearby, and the scholars rescued them, ordering further tunnels dug in order to search for more fragments. Some were found embedded in nearby buildings, indicating that stone from the same area had previously been reused.

Thirty fragments of the Fasti Capitolini were recovered, along with twenty-six fragments of the Acta Triumphalia, or Fasti Triumphales, dating to the same period and recording the names of Roman generals who had been honoured with a triumph. Cardinal Alessandro Farnese brought them to the Palazzo dei Conservatori on the nearby Capitoline Hill, where Ligorio and Michelangelo reconstructed them, based on the observations of Panvinio and Ligorio. Two additional fragments were discovered during excavations in the forum in 1817 and 1818. Others were discovered in excavations from 1872 to 1878, with the last discovered in the Tiber in 1888.

Today, the Palazzo forms part of the Capitoline Museums, and the Capitoline Fasti are housed in the Sala della Lupa, the Salon of the Wolf, together with the Capitoline Wolf, for which the gallery is named.

== Contents ==
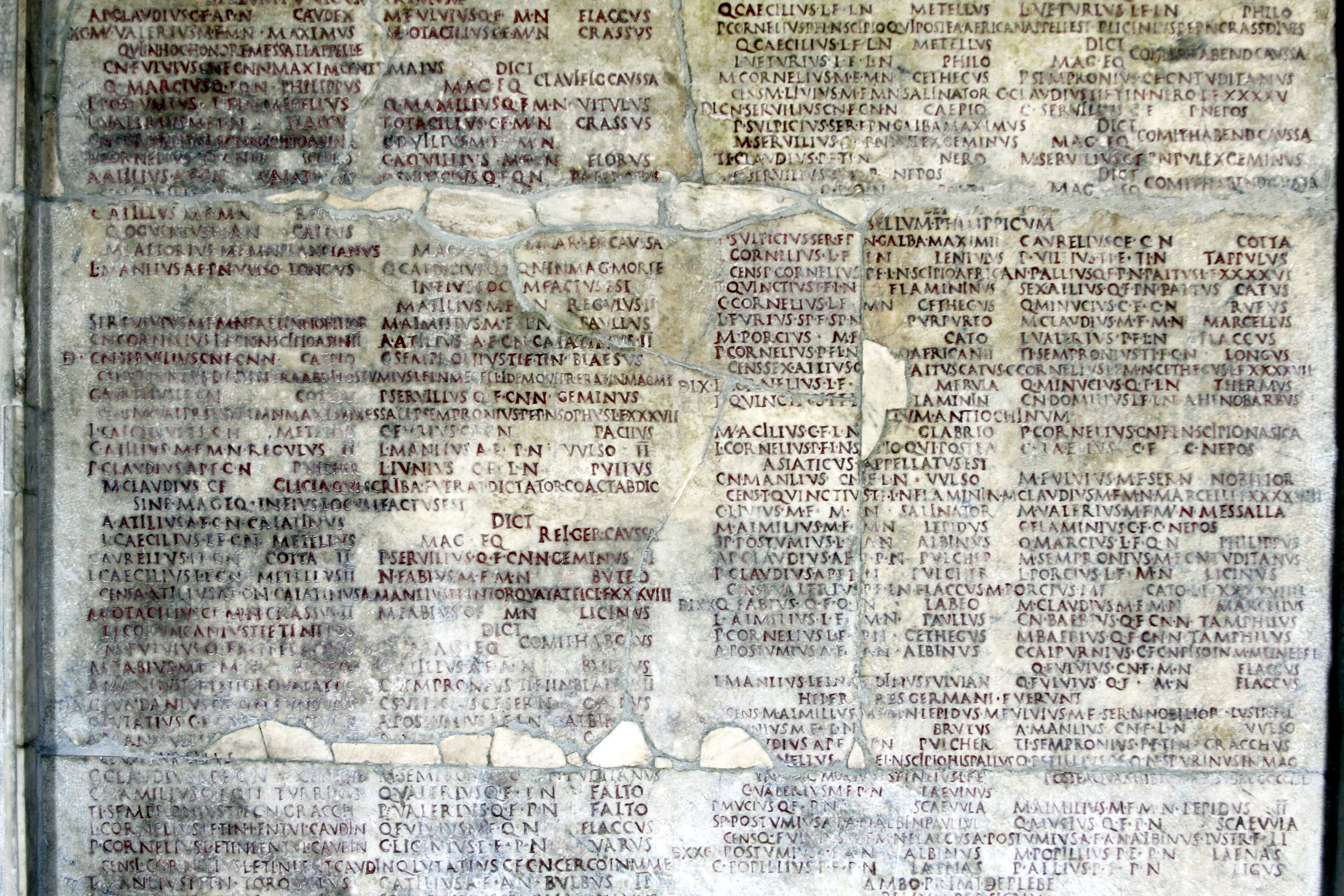
A portion of the Fasti Capitolini, running from 264 to 172 BC. In the upper left corner are Appius Claudius Caudex and Marcus Fulvius Flaccus, consuls in 264, at the beginning of the First Punic War, and in the lower right are Gaius Popillius Laenas and Publius Aelius Ligus, the first pair of plebeian consuls, in 172.

Due to the fragmentary condition of the Fasti Capitolini, it is not entirely certain whether they began with the first year of the Republic, or with the kings, as did the related Fasti Triumphales. The first year which is partially extant is 483 BC. The last surviving year is AD 13, and the fasti probably ended the following year. The extant years include the names of the consuls, who gave their names to each year, as well as consuls suffecti, who replaced those who resigned or died during their year of office. The fasti also include the dictators and magistri equitum for the years in which they were appointed, as well as the censors, together with the decemvirs and consular tribunes for the years in which they were elected in place of consuls.

The original form of the fasti is thought to have consisted of four large tablets, each of which was several feet high. The first ran to 390 BC, the second to 293, the third to 154, and the fourth to 9 BC, with the remaining years to AD 14 in the margin. The fasti include a number of notes, indicating when the office-holders resigned, died, or were killed during their years of office; and they provide additional information, such as the years in which important wars began, the reasons for the nomination of dictators, the number of the lustrum taken by the censors, and the number of years since the founding of Rome, according to the era of Cato, given every ten years. Cato placed the founding of Rome one year later than Varro, so the years given in the fasti appear later than the dates given in the columns on the left.

The Capitoline Fasti were first transcribed and published by Marliani at Rome in 1549, Sigonius at Modena in 1550, and Robortelli at Venice in 1555. Early publications were heavily edited to give the appearance of completeness. The current reconstruction is part of the Corpus Inscriptionum Latinarum, appearing in the first volume, and since amended several times.

== Historical accuracy ==
Although some scholars have questioned the accuracy of the Capitoline Fasti, particularly with regard to the earliest portion, the overall chronology is remarkably consistent from one source to the next, and all of the Roman historians and annalists place the beginning of the Republic within a span of about seven or eight years. The Fasti Capitolini represent the longest version of the chronology, and current scholarly opinion accepts nearly all of the list, with two main exceptions: the so-called "dictator years", four years during the latter part of the fourth century BC, in which the dictators of the preceding years are said to have continued in office without the election of consuls; and also a span of time leading up to the passage of the lex Licinia Sextia in 367 BC, during which the tribunes of the plebs are said to have prevented the election of annual magistrates for five years, in order to force the passage of the law.

The four "dictator years" are generally regarded as a late interpolation, as such a remarkable departure from the Roman constitution, which normally limited the term of a dictator to six months, is not mentioned by any of the Roman historians, nor are the "dictator years" found in any source other than the Capitoline Fasti. The so-called "anarchy" earlier in the fourth century is less easily explained, since the story of this period is corroborated in multiple accounts, including Livy and Diodorus Siculus, but the length of time that Rome was without annual magistrates may have been exaggerated; perhaps only one year, as stated by Diodorus.

== Transcription ==
The following tables give the magistrates and events from the most recent reconstruction of the Fasti Capitolini. The AUC years supplied are based on the Varronian chronology. The actual fasti included dates (provided here in the notes) that are equivalent to taking the year of the founding of Rome as 752 BC rather than 753 BC. Portions of names and text in square brackets have been interpolated. Periods (full stops) have been supplied for abbreviations. An em dash is used for missing or unknown filiations or other abbreviated praenomina. Other missing text is indicated with an ellipsis in brackets, [...]. These tables uses modern conventions for distinguishing between I and J, and between U and V. Otherwise, the names and notes are given as spelled in the fasti. Archaic Roman spellings, such as Aimilius for Aemilius, and caussa for causa, have been preserved. A list of Latin phrases and abbreviations appearing below follows the last table.

=== Magistracies ===
- Censs. = censores, censors
- Coss. = consules, consuls
- Dict. = dictator
- Imp. = imperator, emperor
- Mag. Eq. = magister equitum
- Tribuni Militum cos. pot. = tribuni militum consulari potestate, military tribunes with consular powers, or "consular tribunes"
- IIIvir = triumvir rei publicae constituendae, triumvir to restore the Republic

=== Fifth century BC ===
Year BC	Year AUC	Magistracy	Names	Notes
483	271	Coss.	[M. Fabius K. f. — n. Vibulanus] [L. Valerius M. f. Volusi n.] Potitus	[CCLXX]
482	272	Coss.	[C. Julius C. f. L. n. Iulus] [Q. Fabius K. f. — n.] Vibulanus II	
481	273	Coss.	[K. Fabius K. f. — n. Vibulanus III] Sp. Furius — f. —] n. Fusus	
480	274	Coss.	[Cn. Manlius P? f. — n. Cincinnatus?] [M. Fabius K. f. — n.] Vibulanus II	
479	275	Coss.	[K. Fabius K. f. — n. Vibulanus III] [T. Verginius Opet. f. Op]et. n. Tricost. Ruti[l.]	
478	276	Coss.	[L. Aimilus Mam. f. — n. Mamercus II] [C. Servilius — f. — n. Stru]ctus Ahala [in mag. mortuus es]t in eius loc. f. e. [Opet. Verginius — f. — n. E]squilinus	
477	277	Coss.	[C. Horatius M. f. M. n. Pulvillus] [T. Menenius Agripp. f. C. n.] Lanatus	
476	278	Coss.	[A. Verginius Opet. f. Opet. n. Tricost. Rutil.] [Sp. Servilius P. f. — n. St]ructus	
475	279	Coss.	[P. Valerius P. f. Volusi n. Poplicola] [C. Nautius Sp. f. Sp. n. R]utilus	
474	280	Coss.	[A. Manlius Cn. f. P. n. Vulso] [L. Furius — f. — n. Medullin.]	[lustr]um f. VIII
473	281	Coss.	[L. Aimilius Mam. f. — n. Mamercus III] [Vopiscus Julius C. f. L. n.] Iulus	[CCXXC]
472	282	Coss.	[L. Pinarius — f. — n. Mamercinus Rufus] [P. Furius — f. — n. Medullinus F]usus	
			[Years 471–467 missing]	
466	288	Coss.	Sp. Postumius A. f. P. n. Albus Regi[llens.] [Q. Servilius — f. — n. Priscus II]	
465	289	Coss.	Q. Fabius M. f. K. n. Vibulanu[s II] [T. Quinctius L. f. L. n. Capitolin. Barbat. III]	[l. f. VIIII]
464	290	Coss.	A. Postumius A. f. P. n. Albus Regill[ens.] [Sp. Furius — f. — n. Medullinus Fusus]	
463	291	Coss.	P. Servilius Sp. f. P. n. Prisc[us] [L. Aebutius T. f. T. n. Helva]	CCXC
462	292	Coss.	L. Lucretius T. f. T. n. Tricipitinu[s] [T. Veturius T. f. — n. Geminus Cicurinus]	
461	293	Coss.	P. Volumnius M. f. M. n. Amintin. Gallus [Ser. Sulpicius — f. Ser. n. Camerinus]	
460	294	Coss.	P. Valerius P. f. Volusi n. Poplicola II [C. Claudius Ap. f. M. n. Crass. Inrigill. Sabin.] in mag. mortuus est in eius l. f. e. L. Quinctius L. f. L. n. Cincinnatus	
459	295	Coss.	Q. Fabius M. f. K. n. Vibulanus III [L. Cornelius Ser. f. P. n.] Malugine[n]sis Ur[itin.]	[l. f. X]
458	296	Coss. dict. mag. eq.	C. Nautius Sp. f. Sp. n. Rutilus II [. . . — f. —] n. Carve[. . .] in ma[g.] mortuus est in eius l. f. e. L. Minucius P. f. M. n. Esquilin. Augurin. L. Quinctius L. f. L. n. Cincinnat. L. Tarquitius L. f. Flaccus	rei gerundae caussa
457	297	Coss.	C. Horatius M. f. M. n. Pulvillus II; Q. Minucius P. f. M. n. Esquilinus	
456	298	Coss.	M. Valerius M'. f. Volusi n. Maxumus; Sp. Verginius A. f. A. [n.] Tricost. Caeliomont.	
455	299	Coss.	T. Romilius T. f. T. n. Rocus Vaticanus; C. Veturius P. [f. — n.] Cicurinus	
454	300	Coss.	Sp. Tarpeius M. f. M. n. Montan. Ca[p]itolin. A. Aternius [— f. — n.] Varus Fontinalis	
453	301	Coss.	Sex. Quinctilius Sex. f. P. n. P. Curiatiu[s — f. —] n. Fistus Trigemin.	CCC
452	302	Coss.	P. Sestius Q. f. Vibi n. Capito V[atica]nus; T. Menen[ius Agripp.] f. Agripp. n. Lanatus	
451	303	Coss. decemviri	Ap. Claudius Ap. f. M. n. Crass. Inr[i]gill. Sabin. II; T. Genu[cius L. f. L. n.] Au[gu]rinus: Ap. Claudius Ap. f. M. n. Crass. In[rigill. Sab]in. qui cos. fue[r.] / [Ser. Sulpicius … f. S]er. n. Cameri[nus]; T. Genucius L. f. L. n. Augurin. qui cos. fuerat / [P. Sestius Q. f. Vibi n. Capito]; Sp. Veturius Sp. f. P. n. Cr[as]sus Cicurinus / [P. Curiatius … f. … n. Fistus Trigeminus]; C. Julius C. f. L. n. Iulus / [T. Romilius T. f. T. n. Rocus Vaticanus]; A. Manlius Cn. f. P. n. Vulso / [Sp. Postumius A. f. P. n. Albus Regillensis]	abdicarunt ut de[ce]mviri consular[i imperio fier]ent decemviri consular[i imp]erio legibus s[cribundis fact]i eod. anno
450	304	decemviri	Ap. Claudius A[p. f. M. n.] Crass. Inrigill. Sabi[n.] II / [Q. Fabius M. f. K. n. Vibulanus]; M. Corn[elius … f. Se]r. n. Maluginens[is] / [Q. Poetelius … f. … n. Libo Visolus]; [… Sergius … f. … n.] Esquilin. / [K. Duilius … f. … n.]; [L. Minucius P. f. M. n. Esqui]linus Auguri[n.] / [Sp. Oppius … f. … n. Cornicen]; [T. Antonius … f. … n.] Meren[da] / [M'. Rabuleius … f. … n.]	
			[Years 449–423 missing]	
422	332	tr. mil. cos. pot.	[Q. Antonius T. f. ... n. Merenda] [L. Manlius ... f. ... n. Capitolinus] [L. Papirius L. f. ... n.] Mugillan.	
421	333	Coss.	[T. Quinctius T. f. L. n. Capi]tolin. Barbatus; N. Fabiu[s Q. f. M. n. Vibulanus]	
420	334	tr. mil. cos. pot.	[T. Quinctius L. f. L. n. Pennus] Cincinnatus II / M. Manl[ius … Vulso]; [L. Furius Sp. f. … n. Me]dullinus III / A. Sempron[ius L. f. A. n. Atratinus II]	
419	335	tr. mil. cos. pot.	[Agripp. Menenius T. f. Ag]rip. n. Lanatus / Sp. Nautiu[s Sp. f. Sp. n. Rutilus]; [P. Lucretius Hosti f. … n.] Tricipitinus / C. Serviliu[s Q. f. C. n. Axilla]	
418	336	tr. mil. cos. pot. dict. mag. eq. censs.	[M. Papirius L. f. ... n.] Mugillanus; C. Servilius Q. f. C. n. Axilla II; L. Sergius C. f. C. n. [F]idenas III; Q. Servilius P. f. Sp. n. P[r]iscus Fidenas II; C. (Servilius) Q. f. C. n. Axilla; L. Papirius L. f. [... n.] Mugillanus [. . .]	[rei gerundae caussa] [l. f. XIV]
417	337	tr. mil. cos. pot.	P. Lucretius Hosti f. [… n. Tricipitinus II] / [C. Servilius Q. f. C. n. Axilla III]; Agripp. Menenius T. f. A[gripp. n. Lanatus II] / [Sp. Veturius Sp. f. Sp. n. Crassus Cicurin.]	
416	338	tr. mil. cos. pot.	A. Sempronius L. f. A. n. [Atratinus III] / [M. Papirius L. f. … n. Mugillanus II]; Q. Fabius Q. f. M. n. [Vibulanus] / [Sp. Nautius Sp. f. Sp. n. Rutilus II]	
415	339	tr. mil. cos. pot.	P. Cornelius [A. f.] P. n. [Cossus] / [Q. Quinctius L. f. L. n. Cincinnatus]; C. Valerius L. f. Volusi n. [Potit. Volusus] / [N. Vabius Q. f. M. n. Vibulanus]	
414	340	tr. mil. cos. pot.	Q. Fabius Q. f. M. n. [Vibulanus II] / [L. Valerius L. f. P. n. Potitus]; P. Postumius A. f. A. n. [Albinus Regillens.] / [Cn. Cornelius A. f. M. n. Cossus]	
			[Years 413–410 missing]	
409	345	Coss.	[Cn. Corneliu]s A. f. M. n. Coss[u]s [L. Furius — f. — n.] Medullinus II	
408	346	tr. mil. cos. pot. dict. mag. eq.	[C. Julius Sp. f.] Vopisc[i] n. Iulus [P. Cornelius] A. f. M. n. Cossus [C. Servilius P.] f. Q. n. Ahala [P. Cornelius] M. f. L. n. Rutilus Cossus [C. Servilius P.] f. Q. n. Ahala	rei gerundae caussa
407	347	tr. mil. cos. pot.	[C. Valerius L. f. Volusi] n. Potit. Volusus II / C. Servilius P. f. Q. n. Ahala II; [L. Furius L. f. Sp. n.] Medullinus / N. Fabius Q. f. M. n. Vibulanus II	
406	348	tr. mil. cos. pot.	[P. Cornelius M. f. L. n. R]utilus Cossus / L. Valerius L. f. P. n. Potitus II; [Cn. Cornelius P. f. A. n.] Cossus / N. Fabius M. f. Q. n. Ambustus	
405	349	tr. mil. cos. pot.	[C. Julius Sp. f. Vopisci] n. Iulus II / M'. Aimilius Mam. f. M. n. Mamercinus; [T. Quinctius T. f. L. n. Capit]olin. Barb[at.] / L. Furius L. f. Sp. n. Medullinus II; [Q. Quinctius L. f. L. n. Cinc]innatus II / A. Manlius A. f. Cn. n. Vulso Capitolin.	
404	350	tr. mil. cos. pot.	[P. Cornelius M. f. M. n. Mal]uginensis / Sp. Nautius Sp. f. Sp. n. Rutilus III; [Cn. Cornelius P. f. A. n. Cos]sus II / C. Valerius [L.] f. Vol. n. Potitus Volusus III; [K. Fabius M.] f. Q. n. [Amb]ustus / M'. Serg[ius L. f. L. n.] Fidenas	
403	351	tr. mil. cos. pot. censs.	[M'. Aimil]ius Mam. f. M. n. M[amerc]in. II / M. Fur[ius — f. — n.] Fusus; [Ap. Clau]dius P. f. Ap. n. [Crass]us / L. Juli[us Sp. f. Vopisci n.] Iulus; [M. Qui]nctilius L. f. L. n. [Var]us / L. Valerius L. f. P. n. Potitus III; M. Furius L. f. Sp. n. C[amillus] / [M.] Postumius A. f. A. n. Albinus Regillens.; M. Furius L. f. Sp. n. C[amillus] [M.] Postumius A. f. A. n. Albinus Regillens.	[CCCL] l. f. XVI.
402	352	tr. mil. cos. pot.	[C. Se]rvilius P. f. Q. n. Ahal[a III] / Q. Sulpicius Ser. f. Ser. n. Camerin. Cornut.; [Q. Servilius] Q. f. P. n. Fiden[as] / A. Manlius A. f. Cn. n. Vulso Capitolinus II; [L. Ve]rginius L. f. Opetr. n. Tricost. Esqui[lin.] / M'. Sergius L. f. L. n. Fidenas II	
401	353	tr. mil. cos. pot.	[M. F]urius L. f. Sp. n. Camillus / L. Julius L. f. Vopisci n. Iulus; [Cn. C]ornelius P. s. A. n. Cossus III / M'. Aimilius Mam. f. M. n. Mamercin. III; [L. Vale]rius L. f. P. n. Potitus IIII / K. Fabius M. f. Q. n. Ambustus II	

=== Fourth century BC ===
Year BC	Year AUC	Magistracy	Names	Notes
400	354	tr. mil. cos. pot.	[P. Man]lius M. f. Cn. n. Vulso / P. Maelius Sp. f. C. n. Capitolinus; [P. Licin]ius P. f. P. n. Calvus Esquilinus / Sp. Fu[r]ius L. f. Sp. n. Medullinus; [L. Titini]us L. f. M'. n. Pansa Saccus / L. Poblilius L. f. Voler. n. Philo Vulscus	
399	355	tr. mil. cos. pot.	[Cn. Genu]cius M. f. M. n. Augurinus / C. Duilius K. f. K. n. Longus; [L. Atiliu]s L. f. L. n. Priscus / M. Vetur[i]us Ti. f. Sp. n. Crass. Cicurin.; [M. Pomp]onius L. f. L. n. Rufus / Voler. Po[b]lilius P. f. Vol[e]r. n. Philo	
398	356	tr. mil. cos. pot.	[L. Valeriu]s L. f. P. n. Potitus V / L. Furiu[s L.] f. Sp. n. Medullinb. III; [M. Valerius] M. f. M. n. Lactucin. Maxum. / Q. Servilius [Q. f. P. n. Fi]denas II; [M. Furius L. f. Sp. n. Camill]us II / Q. Sulpicius Ser. [f. Ser. n. Camerin. Cornut. II]	
397	357	tr. mil. cos. pot.	[L. Julius L. f. Vopisci n. Iulu]s II / L. Sergius M'. f. L. n. [Fidenas]; [L. Furius L. f. Sp. n. Medulli]nus IV / P. Cornelius P. f. [M. n. Maluginensis]; [A. Postumius … f. … n. Albin. Regill]ensis / A. Manlius A. f. C[n. n. Vulso Capitol. III]	
396	358	tr. mil. cos. pot. dict. mag. eq.	[L. Titinius L. f. M'. n. Pansa S]accus II / Q. Manlius A. f. [Cn. n. Vulso Capitol.]; [P. Licinius P. f. P. n. Calvus E]squilinus II / Cn. Genuciu[s M. f. M. n. Augurinus II]; [P. Maelius Sp. f. C. n.] Capitolinus II / L. Atilius L. [f. L. n. Priscus II]; [M. Furius L. f. Sp.] n. Camillus [P Cornelius P.] f. M. n. Malug[i]nensis	[rei gerundae caussa]
395	359	tr. mil. cos. pot.	[P. Cornelius P. f. A. n.] Co[s]sus / L. Fu[rius L. f. Sp. n. Medullinus V]; [P. Cornelius … f. … n.] Scipio / [Q. Servilius Q. f. P. n. Fidenas III]; [K. Fabius M. f. Q. n. Ambu]stus III / [M. Valerius M. f. M. n. Lactucin. Maxum. II]	
394	360	tr. mil. cos. pot.	[M. Furius L. f. Sp. n. Camillu]s III / [L. Valerius L. f. L. n. Poplicola]; [L. Furius L. f. Sp. n. Medullinus VI / Sp. Postumius … f. … n. Albinus Regillensis]; [C. Aimilius Ti. f. Ti. n. Mamercinus] / [P. Cornelius … f. … n. … II]	
393	361	Coss. Censs.	[L. Valerius L. f. P. n. Potitus] [vitio facti abdicaru]nt [... Cornel]ius [... f. ... n. Maluginensis] [vitio facti abdicaru]nt in e[or. loc. facti sunt] [L. Lucretius ... f. ... n. Tricipitinus Flavus] in e[or. loc. facti sunt] [Ser. Sulp]icius Q. f. Se[r. n. Camerinus] [L. Papirius ... f. ... n. Cursor] [C. Jul]ius Sp. f. Vopisci n. I[ulus] in mag. mort. es[t] [in e. l. factus est] M. Cornelius P. f. M. [n. Maluginens.]	[CCCLX] [l. f. XVII]
392	362	Coss.	[L. Valerius L. f. P. n. Potitus II] M. Manlius T. f. A. n. [Capitolinus]	
391	363	tr. mil. cos. pot.	[L. Lucretius … f. … n. Tricipitinus Flavus] / L. Aimilius Mam. f. M. [n. Mamercinus]; [Ser. Sulpicius Q. f. Ser. n. Camerinus] / [Ag]rip. Furius Sex. [f. … n. Fusus]; [L. Furius L. f. Sp. n. Medullinus VII] / [C. Ai]milius Ti. f. Ti. n. [Mamercinus II	
390	364	tr. mil. cos. pot.	[Q. Sulpicius T. f. … n. Longus] / [Q. Fabi]us M. f. Q. [n. Ambustus]; [Q. Servilius Q. f. P. n. Fidenas IIII] / [K. Fabius M. f. Q. n. Ambustus IIII]; [P. Cornelius P. f. M. n. Maluginens. II] / [N. Fabius M. f. Q. n. Ambustus II]	
			[Years 389–381 missing]	
380	374	tr. mil. cos. pot. dict. mag. eq.	L. Valerius L. f. [L. n. Poplicola V] / [L. Aimilius Mam. f. M.] n. Mamercin. VI; P. (Valerius) L. f. L. [n. Poti]tus Poplicol. III / Cn. [Sergius … f. … n.] Fiden. Coxo III; Ser. Cornelius P. f. M. n. Malugin. IIII / Ti. Papiri[us … f. …] n. Crassus; Licinus Menenius T. f. T. n. Lanatus II / L. (Papirius) [… f. … n.] Mugillanus II; C. Sulpicius M. f. Q. n. Peticus; T. Quinctius T. f. L. n. Cin[c]innat[us Capitolinus] [A. Sempronius ... f. ... n. Atratinus]	[rei gerundae caussa]
			[Years 379–371 missing]	
370	384	tr. mil. cos. pot.	[L. Furius Sp. f. L. n. Medullinus II] / [P. Valerius L. f. L. n. Potitus P]oplicola V; [A. Manlius T. f. A. n. Capitolinus IIII] / [Ser. Sulpicius … f. … n. Praet]ext. III; [C. Valerius … f. … n. Potitus] / [Ser. Cornelius P. f. M. n. Ma]luginens. VI	
369	385	tr. mil. cos. pot.	[Q. Servilius Q. f. Q. n. Fidenas III] / [M. Cornelius P.? f. M.? n. M]aluginensis; [Q. Quinctius … f. … n. Cincinnatus] / [C. Veturius … f. … n. Crassus Cicur]in. I[I]; [A. Cornelius … f. …] n. Cossus / M. Fabius K. f. M. n. Ambustus II [...]	
368	386	tr. mil. cos. pot. dict. mag. eq. dict. mag. eq.	[T. Quinctius … f. … n. Cincinnat. C]apitolin. / Sp. Servilius C. f. C. n. Structus; Ser. Cornelius P. f. M. n. M]alugin. VII / L. Papirius Sp. f. C. n. Crassus; [Ser. Sulpicius … f. … n. Praet]extat. IIII / L. Veturius L. f. Sp. n. Crassus Cicurinus; [M. Furius L. f. Sp. n. Cami]llus III [post edictu]m in milites ex s. c. abdicarunt [L. Aimilius L. f. Mam. n. M]amercinus [post edictu]m in milites ex s. c. abdicarunt [P. Manlius A. f. A. n. C]apitolinus [C. Licinius C. f. P. n. Calvus]	rei gerundae caussa seditionis sedandae et r. g. c. [pr]imus e plebe
367	387	tr. mil. cos. pot. dict. mag. eq.	[A. Cornelius … f. … n. C]ossus II / L. Veturius L. f. Sp. n. Crassus Cicurinus II; [M. Cornelius P. f. M. n. M]aluginens. II / P. Valerius L. f. L. n. Potitus Poplicola VI; [M. … f. … n. M]acerinus / P. Manlius A. f. A. n. Capitolinus II; [M. Furius L. f. Sp. n. C]amillus V [T. Quinctius ... f. ... n. Cincin]natus Capitolinus	rei gerundae caussa [Consules e pl]ebe primum creari coepti
366	388	Coss. Censs.	[L. Aimilius L. f. Mam. n. M]amercinus; L. Sextius Sex. f. N. n. Sextin. Lateran. [... Postumius ... f. ... n.] Regillensis Albinus; C. Sulpicius M. f. Q. n. Peticus	primus e plebe
365	389	Coss.	[L. Genucius M. f. Cn. n. Ave]ntinensis; Q. Servilius Q. f. Q. n. Ahala	
364	390	Coss.	[C. Sulpicius M. f. Q. n] Peticus; C. Licinius C. f. P. n. Calvus	
363	391	Coss. Dict. Mag. Eq. Censs.	[L. Aimilius L. f. Mam. n. Ma]mercinus II; Cn. Genucius M. f. M. n. Aventinensis [L. Manlius A. f. A. n. Capitolin.] Imperiossus [L. Pinarius — f. — n.] Natta [M. Fabius K. f. M. n.] Ambustus; L. Furius Sp. f. L. nepos Medullinus	[CCCXC] clavi fig. caussa l. f. XX
362	392	Coss. Dict. Mag. Eq.	[Q. Servilius Q. f. Q. n.] Ahala II; L. Genucius M. f. Cn. n. Aventinens. II [Ap. Claudius P. f. Ap. n. Cr]assus Inregillensis [. . .] Sca[.]v[.]la	rei gerundae caussa
361	393	Coss. Dict.	[C. Licinius C. f. P. n. St]olo; C. Sulpicius M. f. Q. n. Peticus II [T. Quinctius — f. — n. Penn]us Capitolinus Crispinus [Ser. Cornelius P. f.] M. n. Maluginensis	rei gerund. caussa
360	394	Coss. Dict. Mag. Eq.	[M. Fabius N. f. M. n.] Ambustus; C. Poetelius C. f. Q. n. Libo Visolus [Q. Servilius Q. f. Q. n.] Ahala [T. Quinctius — f. — n. Pennus] Capitolin. Crispinus	rei gerund. caussa
359	395	Coss.	[M. Popillius M. f. C. n.] Laenas; Cn. Manlius L. f. A. n. Capitolin. Imperioss.	
358	396	Coss.	[C. Fabius N. f. M. n. Amb]ustus; C. Plautius P. f. P. n. Proculus	
			[Years 357–351 missing]	
350	404	Coss. Dict. Mag. Eq.	[M. Popillius M. f. C. n. Laenas III] [L. Cornelius P. f. — n. Scipio] [L. Furius M. f. L. n. Camillus [P. Cornelius P. f. — n. Scipio]	[comit. habend. causa]
349	405	Coss. Dict. Mag. Eq.	[L. Furius M. f. L. n. Camillus] [Ap. Cl]audius P. f. A[p.] n. Crass. [I]nrigil[lens.] [T. Manlius L. f. A. n. Imperioss. Torquat. II a]biit dict. [A. Cornelius P. f. A. n. Cossus Arvina II]	comit. habend. caus[a]
348	406	Coss. Dict. Mag. Eq.	[M. Popillius M. f. C. n. Laenas IIII] [M. Val]erius M. f. M. n. Corvus [. . .] [. . .]	comit. habend. caussa
347	407	Coss.	[C. Plautius — f. — n. Venno] [T. Manlius L. f. A. n. Impe]rioss. Torquat.	
346	408	Coss.	[M. Valerius M. f. M. n. Corvus II] [C. Poetelius C. f. Q. n. Libo] Visolus II	
			[Years 345–334 missing]	
332	422	Coss. Censs.	[. . .] [. . .] [Q. Poblilius Q. f. Q. n. Philo] [Sp. Postumius — f. — n. Albinus] qui postea [C]audinus apell.	[est l. f. XXIIII]
331	423	Coss. Dict. Mag. Eq.	C. Val[e]rius L. f. L. n. Potitus; M. Claudius C. f. C. n. Marcellus [. . .] Cn. Q[u]inctius T. f. T. n. Capitolinus; C. Valerius L. f. L. n. Potitus postea quam cos. abiit mag. eq.	clavi fig. c[ausa]
330	424	Coss.	L. Papi[r]ius L. f. L. n. Crassus II; L. Plautius L. f. L. n. Venno	
329	425	Coss.	L. A[imilius L. f. L. n. Mamercinus II] [C. Plautius P. f. P. n. Decianus qui in hoc honore Privernas appellatus est]	
			[Years 328–321 missing]	
320	434	Coss. Dict. Mag. Eq. Dict. Mag. Eq. Dict. Mag. Eq.	L. P[apirius Sp. f. L. n. Curs]or II; Q. Pobli[lius Q. f. Q. n. Philo III] C. Ma[inius P. f. P. n.] M. Fos[lius C. f. M. n. Flac]cinator; L. Corn[elius — f. — n. Len]tulus; L. Papiri[us Sp. f. L. n. Curs]or II; T. Manliu[s L. f. A. n. Imperio]ss. Torquatus III; L. Papiriu[s Sp. f. L. n. Curso]r III	[quaest. exerc. causa] [rei gerund. causa] [comit. habend. causa]
319	435	Coss. Censs.	L. Papirius [Sp. f. L. n. Curs]or III; Q. Aulius Q. f. Q. [n. Cerretanus II] [. . .] C. Su]lpicius Se[r. f. Q. n. Longus abd. [. . .]	
318	436	Coss. Censs.	L. Plautius L. f. L. n. Venno; M. Foslius C. f. M. n. Flaccinator; L. Papirius L. f. M. n. Crassus; C. Mainius P. f. P. n.	lustrum fecer. XXV
317	437	Coss.	Q. Aimilius Q. f. L. n. Barbula; C. Junius C. f. C. n. Bubulcus Brutus	
316	438	Coss. Dict. Mag. Eq.	Sp. Nautius Sp. f. Sp. n. Rutilus; M. Popillius M. f. M. n. Laenas; L. Aimilius L. f. L. n. Mamerc. Privernas II; L. Fulvius L. f. L. n. Curvus	rei gerund. c.
315	439	Coss. Dict. Mag. Eq.	L. Papirius Sp. f. L. n. Cursor IV; Q. Poblilius Q. f. Q. n. Philo IIII; Q. Fabius M. f. N. n. Maximus Rullianus; Q. Aulius Q. f. Ai. n. Cerretan. in proelio occisus est in eius l. f. est [C.] Fabius M. f. N. n. Ambustus	r. g. c.
314	440	Coss. Dict. Mag. Eq.	M. Poetelius M. f. M. n. Libo; C. Sulpicius Ser. f. Q. n. Longus III; C. Mainius P. f. P. n. II; M. Foslius C. f. M. n. Flaccinator II	rei gerund. caussa
313	441	Coss. Dict. Mag. Eq.	L. Papirius Sp. f. L. n. Cursor V C. Junius C. f. C. n. Bubulcus Brutus II; C. Poetelius C. f. C. n. Libo Visolus; M. [Poetelius] M. f. M. n. Libo	CDXL rei gerund. caussa
312	442	Coss. Dict. Mag. Eq. Censs.	M. Valerius M. f. M. n. Maximus; P. Decius P. f. Q. n. Mus; C. Sulpicius Ser. f. Q. n. Longus; C. Junius C. f. C. n. Bubulcus Brutus; Ap. Claudius C. f. Ap. n. Caecus; C. Plautius C. f. C. n. qui in hoc honore Venox appellatus est	rei gerund. caussa l. f. XXVI
311	443	Coss.	C. Junius C. f. C. n. Bubulcus Brutus III; Q. Aimilius Q. f. L. n. Barbula II	
310	444	Coss. Dict. Mag. Eq.	Q. Fabius M. f. N. n. Maxim. Rullian. II; C. Marcius C. f. L. n. Rutilus qui postea Censorinus appellatus est L. Papirius Sp. f. L. n. Cursor II; C. Junius C. f. C. n. Bubulcus Brutus II	rei gerund. caussa
309	445	Dict. Mag. Eq.	L. Papirius Sp. f. L. n. Cursor II; C. Junius C. f. C. n. Bubulcus Brutus II	hoc anno dictator et magister eq. sine cos. fuerunt
308	446	Coss.	P. Decius P. f. Q. n. Mus II; Q. Fabius M. f. N. n. Maxim. Rullian. III	
307	447	Coss. Censs.	Ap. Claudius C. f. Ap. n. Caecus; L. Volumnius C. f. C. n. Flamma Violens; M. Valerius M. f. M. n. Maximus; C. Junius C. f. C. n. Bubulc. Brutus	l. f. XXVII
306	448	Coss. Dict. Mag. Eq.	[Q. Marcius Q. f. Q. n.] Tr[e]mulus; P. Corn[elius A. f. P. n. Arvina] [P. Cornelius — f. —] n. Scipio Barbatus [P. Decius P. f. Q. n.] Mus	[comit. habend. causa]
305	449	Coss.	[L. Postumius L. f. Sp. n.] Megellus; Ti. Mi[nucius — f. — n. Augurinus] in mag. mortuus est [in e. l. f. e.] M. [Fulvius L. f. L. n. Curvus Paetinus]	
304	450	Coss. Censs.	[P. Sempronius P. f.] C. n. Sophus; P. S[ulpicius Ser. f. P. n. Saverrio] [Q. Fabius M. f.] N. n. Maxim. Rullianu[s] [P. Decius P. f. Q. n. Mus]	[l. f. XXVIII]
303	451	Coss.	[Ser. Cornelius C]n. f. Cn. n. Lentulus [L. Genucius — f. — n. Aventinensis]	[CDL]
302	452	Coss. Dict. Mag. Eq. Dict. Mag. Eq.	[M. Livius — f.] C. n. Dent[er] [M. Aimilius L. f. L. n. Paullus] [C. Junius C. f. C.] n. Bubulcus Bru[tus] [M. Titinius] C. f. C. n. [M. Valerius M. f.] M. [n.] Ma[ximus Corvus II] [Q. Fabius] M. f. N. n. Maxi[mus Rullianus II abd.] [in e. l. f. e. M. Ai]milius L. f. L. [n. Paullus]	[rei gerund. causa] [rei gerund. causa]
301	453	Dict. Mag. Eq.	[M. Valerius M. f.] M. [n.] Ma[ximus Corvus II] [M. Ai]milius L. f. L. [n. Paullus]	[hoc an]no dictat. [et mag. eq. sine cos. fuerunt]

=== Third century BC ===
Year BC	Year AUC	Magistracy	Names	Notes
300	454	Coss. Censs.	[M. Valerius] M. f. M. n. [Corvus V] [Q. Appuleius — f. — n. Pansa] [P. Sempr]onius [P. f. C. n. Sophus] [P. Sulpicius Ser. f. P. n. Saverrio]	l. f. XXIX
299	455	Coss.	[M. Fulvius Cn.] f. Cn. [n. Paetinus] [T. Manlius T. f. T. n. Torquatus in mag. mort. est] [est in e. l. f. est M. Valerius M. f. M. n. Corvus] VI	
298	456	Coss.	[L. Cornelius Cn. f. — n. Scipio Barbatus] [Cn. Fulvius Cn. f. Cn. n. Max. Centumalus]	
297	457	Coss.	[Q. Fabius M. f. N. n. Maxim. Rullian. IIII] [P. Decius P. f. Q. n. Mus II]I	
296	458	Coss.	[Ap. Claudius C. f. Ap. n.] Ca[ecus II] [L. Volumnius C. f. C. n. Flamma Vio]lens II	
295	459	Coss.	[Q. Fabius M. f. N. n. Maxi]m. Rull[ianus V] [P. Decius P. f. Q. n. Mus IIII s]e devovit	
294	460	Coss. Censs.	[L. Postumius L. f. S]p. n. Megellu[s II] [M. Atilius M. f. M. n. Regu]lus; P. Cornelius A. f. P. n. Arvin[a] [C. Marcius C. f. L. n. Rutilus qui postea Censorinus appel]l. est.	[l. f. X]XX
293	461	Coss.	[L.] Papirius L. f. Sp. n. Cursor; Sp. [Carvilius C. f. C. n. Maxi]mus	[CDLX]
			[Years 292–285 missing]	
284	470	Coss.	[C. Servilius — f. — n. Tucca] [L. Caecilius — f. — n. Mete]ll. Denter	
283	471	Coss. Censs.	[P. Cornelius — f. — n. Dolabella] [Cn. Domitius Cn. f. Cn. n. Ca]lvin. Maxim. [. . .] [Q. Caecicius Q. f. — n.] Noctua abd.	[CDLXX]
282	472	Coss.	[C. Fabricius C. f. C. n. Luscinus] [Q. Aimilius Cn. f. L. n.] Papus	
281	473	Coss.	[L. Aimilius Q. f. Q. n. Barbula] [Q. Marcius Q. f. Q. n.] Phil[i]ppus	
280	474	Coss. Dict. Mag. Eq. Censs.	[P. Valerius — f. — n. Laevinus] [Ti. Coruncanius Ti. f.] Ti. n. [. . .] [Cn. Domitius Cn. f. Cn. n. Calvinus Maximus] [. . .] [L. Cornelius Cn. f. — n. Scipio Barbatus] [Cn. D]omitius Cn. f. Cn. n. Calvin. Max. [postea qu]am dictatura abiit	comit. h. c. l. f. XXXII
279	475	Coss.	[P. Sulpicius P.] f. [Ser. n. S]averrio; P. Deciu[s] P. f. P. n. [Mus]	
278	476	Coss.	[C. Fa]bricius C. f. C. n. Luscinus II; Q. Aimilius Cn. f. L. n. Papus II	
277	477	Coss.	[P. C]ornelius Cn. f. P. n. Rufinus II; C. Junius C. f. C. n. Bubulcus Brutus II	
276	478	Coss.	[Q.] Fabius Q. f. M. n. Maxim. Gurges II; C. Genucius L. f.L. n. Clepsina	
275	479	Coss. Censs.	M'. Curius M'. f. M'. n. Dentatus II; L. Cornelius Ti. f. Ser. n. Lentulus qui postea Caudinus appellatus est C. Fabricius C. f. C. n. Luscinus; Q. Aimilius Cn. f. L. n. Papus	l. f. XXXIII
274	480	Coss.	M'. Curius M'. f. M'. n. Dentatus III; Ser. Cornelius P. f. Ser. n. Merenda	
273	481	Coss.	C. Fabius M. f. M. n. Licinus; C. Claudius M. f. C. n. Canina II	[CDXXC]
272	482	Coss. Censs.	[L.] Papirius L. f. Sp. n. Cursor II; Sp. Carvilius C. f. C. n. Maxim. II [L. Papirius L. f. M. n. Praetext. in mag. m. e. M'. Curius M.' f. M'. n. Dentatus	
271	483	Coss.	[K. Quinctius] L. f. Cn. n. Claudus; L. Genucius L. f. L. n. Clepsina	
270	484	Coss.	[C. Genucius L. f. L. n.] Clepsina II; Cn. Cornelius P. f. Cn. n. Blasio	
269	485	Coss. Censs.	[Q. Ogulnius L. f. A. n.] Gallus; C. Fabius C. f. M. n. Pictor [Q. Marcius Q. f. Q. n. Phili]ppus; L. Aimilius Q. f. Q. n. Barbula	l. f. XXXIV
268	486	Coss.	[P. Sempronius P. f. P. n. Sophus] Ap. Claudius Ap. f. C. n. Russus in m. m. e.	
267	487	Coss.	[M. Atilius M. f. L. n. Regulus] L. Jul]ius L. f. L. n. Libo	
266	488	Coss.	[D. Junius D. f. D. n. Pera] [N. Fabius C. f. M. n. Pictor]	
265	489	Coss. Censs.	[Q. Fabius Q. f. Q. n. Maxim.] [L. Mamilius Q. f. M. n. Vitulus] Cn. Cornelius P. f. Cn. n. Blasio; C. Marcius C. f. L. n. Rutilus II qui in hic honore Censorin. appel. e.	l. f. XXXV
264	490	Coss.	Ap. Claudius C. f. Ap. n. Caudex; M. Fulvius Q. f. M. n. Flaccus	Bellum Punicum primum
263	491	Coss. Dict. Mag. Eq.	M'. Valerius M. f. M. n. Maximus qui in hoc honore Messall. appell. e. M'. Otacilius C. f. M'. n. Crassus; Cn. Fulvius Cn. f. Cn. n. Maxim. Centumalus; Q. Marcius Q. f. Q. n. Philippus	[C]DXC clavi fig. caussa
262	492	Coss.	L. Postumius L. f. L. n. Megellus; Q. Mamilius Q. f. M. n. Vitulus	
261	493	Coss.	L. Valerius M. f. L. n. Flaccus; T. Otacilius C. f. M'. n. Crassus	
260	494	Coss.	Cn. Cornelius L. f. Cn. n. Scipio Asina; C. Duilius M. f. M. n.	
259	495	Coss.	L. Cornelius L. f. Cn. n. Scipio; C. Aquillius M. f. C. n. Florus	
258	496	Coss. Censs.	A. Atilius A. f. C. n. Caiatinus; C. Sulpicius Q. f. Q. n. Paterculus; C. Duilius M. f. M. [n.] L. [Cornelius L. f. Cn.] n. S[c]ip[io]	[lustr. f. XXXVI]
257	497	Coss. Dict. Mag. Eq.	C. Atilius M. f. M. n. Regulus; Cn. [Cornelius P f. Cn. n. Blasio II] Q. Ogulnius L. f. A. n. Gallus; M. Laetorius M. f. M. n. Plancianus	[L]atinar. fer. caussa
256	498	Coss.	L. Manlius A. f. P. n. Vulso Longus; Q. Caedicius Q. f. Q. n. in mag. mort. e. [i]n eius locum factus est M. Atilius M. f. L. n. Regulus II	
255	499	Coss.	Ser. Fulvius M. f. M. n. Paetin. Nobilior; M. Aimilius M. f. L. n. Paullus	
254	500	Coss.	Cn. Cornelius L. f. Cn. n. Scipio Asin. II; A. Atilius A. f. C. n. Caiatinus II	
253	501	Coss. Censs.	Cn. Servilius Cn. f. Cn. n. Caepio; C. Sempronius Ti. f. Ti. n. Blaesus; D. Junius D. f. D. n. Pera abd. L. Postumius L. f. L. n. Megell. idem qui pr. erat in mag. m. e.	
252	502	Coss. Censs.	C. Aurelius L. f. C. n. Ctta; P. Servilius Q. f. Cn. n. Geminus; M'. Val[e]rius M. f. M. n. Maxim. Messall. P. Sempronius P. f. P. n. Sophus	l. f. XXXVII
251	503	Coss.	L. Caecilius L. f. C. n. Metellus; C. Furius C. f. C. n. Pacilus	
250	504	Coss.	C. Atilius M. f. M. n. Regulus II; L. Manlius A. f. P. n. Vulso II	
249	505	Coss. Dict. Dict. Mag. Eq.	P. Claudius Ap. f. C. n. Pulcher; L. Junius C. f. L. n. Pullus; M. Claudius C. f. Glicia qui scriba fuerat; abdic. in eius locum factus est A. Atilius A. f. C. n. Caiatinus; L. Caecilius L. f. C. n. Metellus	sine mag. eq.; rei ger. caussa
248	506	Coss.	C. Aurelius L. f. C. n. Cotta II; P. Servilius Q. f. Cn. n. Geminus II	
247	507	Coss. Censs.	L. Caecilius L. f. C. n. Metellus II; N. Fabius M. f. M. n. Buteo; A. Atilius A. f. C. n. Caiatinus; A. Manlius T. f. T. n. Torquat. At[t]ic.	l. f. XXXVIII
246	508	Coss. Dict. Mag. Eq.	M'. Otacilius C. f. M'. n. Crassus II; M. Fabius C. f. M. n. Licinus; Ti. Coruncanius Ti. f. Ti. n. M. Fulvius Q. f. M. n. Flaccus	comit. hab. caus.
245	509	Coss.	M. Fabius M. f. M. n. Buteo; C. Atilius A. f. A. n. Bulbus	
244	510	Coss.	A. Manlius T. f. T. n. Torquat. Attic. C. Sempronius Ti. f. Ti. n. Blaesus II	
243	511	Coss.	C. Fundanius C. f. Q. n. Fundulus; C. Sulpicius C. f. Ser. n. Galus	
242	512	Coss.	C. Lutatius C. f. C. n. Catulus; A. Postumius A. f. L. n. Albinus	
241	513	Coss. Censs.	A. Manlius T. f. T. n. To[rquat.] Attic. II; Q. Lutatius [C. f.] C. n. Cer[co] C. Aurelius L. f. C. n. Co[tta] [M. Fabius M. f. M. n. Buteo]	[l. f. XXXIX]
240	514	Coss.	C. Claudius Ap. f. C. n. Centho; M. Sempronius C. f. M. n. Tuditanus	
239	515	Coss.	C. Mamilius Q. f. Q. n. Turrinus; Q. Valerius Q. f. P. n. Falto	
238	516	Coss.	Ti. Sempronius Ti. f. C. n. Gracch. P. Valerius Q. f. P. n. Falto	
237	517	Coss.	L. Cornelius L. f. Ti. n. Lentul. Caudin. Q. Fulvius M. f. Q. n. Flaccus	
236	518	Coss. Censs.	P. Cornelius L. f. Ti. n. Lentul. Caudin. C. Licinius P. f. P. n. Varus; L. Cornelius L. f. Ti. n. Lentulus Caudin. Q. Lutatius C. f. C. n. Cerco in m. m. e.	
235	519	Coss.	T. Manlius T. f. T. n. Torquatus; C. Atilius A. f. A. n. Bulbus II	
234	520	Coss. Censs.	L. Postumius A. f. A. n. Albinus; Sp. Carvilius Sp. f. C. n. Maximus; C. Atilius A. f. A. n. Bulbus; A. Postumius A. f. L. n. Albinus	l. f. XL
233	521	Coss.	Q. Fabius Q. f. Q. n. Maxum. Verrucos. M'. Pomponius M'. f. M'. n. Matho	DXX
232	522	Coss.	M. Aimilius M. f. M. n. [L]epidus; M. Poblicius L. f. L. n. Malleolus	
231	523	Coss. Dict. Mag. Eq. Censs.	M. Pomponius M'. f. M'. n. Matho; C. Papirius C. f. L. n. Maso; C. Duilius M. f. M. n. C. Aurelius L. f. C. n. Cotta; T. Manlius T. f. T. n. Torquatus vit. facti abd. Q. Fulvius M. f. Q. n. Flaccus vit. facti abd.	comit. habend. caussa
230	524	Coss. Censs.	M. Aimilius L. f. Q. n. Barbula; M. Junius D. f. D. n. Pera; Q. Fabius Q. f. Q. n. Maxim. Verrucos. M. Sempronius C. f. M. n. Tuditan.	l. f. XLI
229	525	Coss.	L. Postumius A. f. A. n. Albinus II; Cn. Fulvius Cn. f. Cn. n. Centumalus	
228	526	Coss.	Sp. Carvilius Sp. f. C. n. Maximus II; Q. Fabius Q. f. Q. n. Maxim. Verrucos. II	
227	527	Coss.	P. Valerius L. f. M. n. Flaccus; M. Atilius M. f. M. n. Regulus	
226	528	Coss.	M. Valerius M'. f. M. n. Messalla; L. Apustius L. f. C. n. Fullo	
225	529	Coss. Censs.	L. Aimilius Q. f. Cn. n. Papus; C. Atilius M. f. M. n. Regulus; C. Claudius Ap. f. C. n. Centho; M. Junius D. f. D. n. Pera	Bellum Gallicum cisalpinum l. f. XXXXII
224	530	Coss. Dict. Mag. Eq.	T. Manlius T. f. T. n. Torquatus II; Q. Fulvius M. f. Q. n. Flaccus II; L. Caecilius L. f. C. n. Metellus; N. Fabius M. f. M. n. Buteo	comit. hab. caussa
223	531	Coss.	C. Flaminius C. f. L. n. P. Furius Sp. f. M. n. Perilus	DXXX
222	532	Coss.	Cn. Cornelius L. f. L. n. Scipio Calv. M. Claudius M. f. M. n. Marcellus	
			[Years 221–219 missing]	
218	536	Coss.	[P. Cornelius L. f. L.] n. Scipio; Ti. Sempronius C. f. C. n. Longus	[Bellum Pun]icum [secu]nd[u]m
217	537	Coss. Dict. Mag. Eq. Dict. Mag. Eq.	[Cn. Servilius P. f.] Q. n. Geminus; C. Flaminius C. f. L. n. II in mag. in proelio occisus est in eius l. f. e. M. Atilius M. f. M. n. Regulus II; Q. Fabius Q. f. Q. n. Maxim. Verrucoss. II; M. Minucius C. f. C. n. Rufus; L. Veturius L. f. Post. n. [P]hilo; M. Pomponius M'. f. M'. n. [M]atho	interregni caus. comit. hab. caussa
216	538	Coss. Dict. Mag. Eq. Dict.	L. Aimilius M. f. M. n. Paul. II; C. Terentius C. f. M. n. Varro; M. Julius D. f. D. n. Pera; Ti. Sempronius Ti. f. Ti. n. Gracchus; M. Fabius M. f. M. n. Buteo	rei gerund. caussa sine mag. eq.; senat. leg. caussa
215	539	Coss.	Ti. Sempronius Ti. f. Ti. n. Gracch. L. Postumius A. f. A. n. Albinus III [h]ic in praetura in Gall. occis. est quod antequam ciretur [...]s in eius l. f. [e. M. Claudius M. f. M. n. Marcellus II vitio factus abd. [in e. l. f.] est Q. Fabius Q. f. Q. n. Maxim. Verruc. III	
214	540	Coss. Censs.	Q. Fabius Q. f. [Q.] n. Maxim. Verruc. IV; M. Claudius M. f. M. n. Marcellus III; M. Atilius M. f. M. n. Regulus abd. P. Furius Sp. f. M. n. Philus in mag. m. est.	
213	541	Coss. Dict. Mag. Eq.	Q. Fabius Q. f. Q. n. Maximus; Ti. Sempronius Ti. f. Ti. n. Gracchus II; C. Claudius Ap. f. C. n. Centho; Q. Fulvius M. f. Q. n. Flaccus	DXL comit. hab. caussa
212	542	Coss.	Ap. Claudius P. f. Ap. n. Pulcher; Q. Fulvius M. f. Q. n. Flaccus III	
211	543	Coss.	P. Sulpicius Ser. f. P. n. Galba Maxim. Cn. Fulvius Cn. f. Cn. n. Centumal. Ma[x.]	
210	544	Coss. Censs. Dict. Mag. Eq.	M. Valerius P. f. P. n. Laevinus II; M. Claudius M. f. M. n. Marcell. IIII; L. Veturius L. f. Post. n. Philo in mag. m. e. P. Licinius P. f. P. n. Crassus Dives; Q. Fulvius M. f. Q. n. Flaccus; P. Licinius P. f. P. n. Crassus Dives postea quam censura abiit	c. h. c.
209	545	Coss. Censs.	Q. Fabius Q. f. Q. n. Maxim. Verrucos. V Q. Fulvius M. f. Q. n. Flaccus IIII; P. Sempronius C. f. C. n. Tuditan. M. Cornelius M. f. M. n. Cethegus	l. f. XLIV
208	546	Coss. Dict. Mag. Eq.	M. Claudius M. f. M. n. Marcellus V T. Quinctius L. f. L. n. Crispin. ex vol. T. Manlius T. f. T. n. Torquatus [C. Servilius C. f. P. nepos]	rei g. et c. [h. c.]
207	547	Coss. Dict. Mag. Eq.	C. Claudius Ti. f. Ti. n. Nero; M. Livius M. f. M. n. Salinator [II] M. Livius M. f. M. n. Salinator; Q. Caecilius L. f. L. n. Metellus	comit. hab. caussa
206	548	Coss.	Q. Caecilius L. f. L. n. Metellus; L. Veturius L. f. L. n. Philo	
205	549	Coss. Dict. Mag. Eq.	P. Cornelius P. f. L. n. Scipio qui postea African. appell. est P. Licinius P. f. P. n. Crassus Dives; Q. Caecilius L. f. L. n. Metellus; L. Veturius L. f. L. n. Philo	comit. habend. caussa
204	550	Coss. Censs.	M. Cornelius M. f. M. n. Cethegus; P. Sempronius C. f. C. n. Tuditanus; M. Livius M. f. M. n. Salinator; C. Claudius Ti. f. Ti. n. Nero	l. f. XXXXV
203	551	Coss. Dict. Mag. Eq.	Cn. Servilius Cn. f. Cn. n. Caepio; C. Servilius C. f. P. n. P. Sulpicius Ser. f. P. n. Galba Maximus; M. Servilius C. f. P. n. Pulex Geminus	DL comit. habend. caussa
202	552	Coss. Dict. Mag. Eq.	Ti. Claudius P. f. Ti. n. Nero; M. Servilius C. f. P. n. Pulex Geminus; C. Servilius C. f. P. nepos [P. Ai]lius Q. f. [P.] n. Paitu[s]	comit. habend. caussa
201	553	Coss.	[Cn. Corne]l[ius L. f.] L. n. Lentulus; P. Ail[ius Q. f. P. n. Paitus]	

=== Second century BC ===
Year BC	Year AUC	Magistracy	Names	Notes
200	554	Coss.	P. Sulpicius Ser. f. P. n. Galba Maxim. II; C. Aurelius C. f. C. n. Cotta	Bellum Philippicum
199	555	Coss. Censs.	L. Cornelius L. f. L. n. Lentulus; P. Villius Ti. f. Ti. n. Tappulus; P. Cornelius P. f. L. n. Scipio African. P. Ailius Q. f. P. n. Paitus	l. f. XXXXVI
198	556	Coss.	T. Quinctius T. f. L. n. Flamininus; Sex. Ailius Q. f. P. n. Paitus Catus	
197	557	Coss.	C. Cornelius L. f. M. n. Cethegus; Q. Minucius C. f. C. n. Rufus	
196	558	Coss.	L. Furus Sp. f. Sp. n. Purpureo; M. Claudius M. f. M. n. Marcellus	
195	559	Coss.	M. Porcius M. f. Cato; L. Valerius P. f. L. n. Flaccus	
194	560	Coss. Censs.	P. Cornelius P. f. L. n. [Sci]pio African. II; Ti. Sempronius Ti. f. C. n. Longus; Sex. Ailius Q. [f. P. n.] Paitus Catus; C. Cornelius L. f. M. n. Cethegus	l. f. XXXXVII
193	561	Coss.	L. Cornelius L. f. [— n.] Merula; Q. Minucius Q. f. L. n. Thermus	DLX
192	562	Coss.	L. Quinctius T. f. L. [n.] Flaminin. Cn. Domitius L. f. L. n. Ahenobarbus	
191	563	Coss.	M'. Acilius C. f. L. n. Glabrio; P. Cornelius Cn. f. L. n. Scipio Nasica	[Be]llum Antiochinum
190	564	Coss.	L. Cornelius P. f. L. n. S[c]ipio qui postea Asiaticus appellatus est C. Laelius C. f. C. nepos	
189	565	Coss. Censs.	Cn. Manlius Cn. f. L. n. Vulso; M. Fulvius M. f. Ser. n. Nobilior; T. Quinctius T. f. L. n. Flaminin. M. Claudius M. f. M. n. Marcell.	l. f. XXXXVIII
188	566	Coss.	C. Livius M. f. M. n. Salinator; M. Valerius M. f. M'. n. Messalla	
187	567	Coss.	M. Aimilius M. f. M. n. Lepidus; C. Flaminius C. f. C. nepos	
186	568	Coss.	Sp. Postumius L. f. A. n. Albinus; Q. Marcius L. f. Q. n. Philippus	
185	569	Coss.	Ap. Claudius Ap. f. P. n. Pulcher; M. Sempronius M. f. C. n. Tuditanus	
184	570	Coss. Censs.	P. Claudius Ap. f. P. n. Pulcher; L. Porcius L. f. M. n. Licinus; L. Valerius P. f. L. n. Flaccus; M. Porcius M. f. M. n. Cato	l. f. XXXXVIIII
183	571	Coss.	Q. Fabius Q. f. Q. n. Labeo; M. Claudus M. f. M. n. Marcellus	DLXX
182	572	Coss.	L. Aimilius L. f. M. n. Paullus; Cn. Baebius Q. f. Cn. n. Tamphilus	
181	573	Coss.	P. Cornelius L. f. P. n. Cethegus; M. Baebius Q. f. Cn. n. Tamphilus	
180	574	Coss.	A. Postumius A. f. A. n. Albinus; C. Calpurnius C. f. C. n. Piso in m. m. e. in e. l. f. e. Q. Fulvius Cn. f. M. n. Flaccus	
179	575	Coss. Censs.	L. Manlius L. f. L. n. Acidinus Fulvian. Q. Fulvius Q. f. M. n. Flaccus hei fratres germani fuerunt M. Aimilius M. f. M. n. Lepidus; M. Fulvius M. f. Ser. n. Nobilior	l. f. L
178	576	Coss.	[M. J]unius M. f. L. n. Brutus; A. Manlius Cn. f. L. n. Vulso	
177	577	Coss.	[C. Cla]udius Ap. f. P. n. Pulcher; Ti. Sempronius P. f. Ti. n. Gracchus	
176	578	Coss.	[Cn. Cor]nelius C[n.] f. L. n. Scipio Hispallus in mag. mortuus est in eius l. f. e. Q. Petillius C. f. Q. n. Spurinus in mag. postea quam sibi conleg. subrog. occis. e. C. Valerius M. f. P. n. Laevinus	
175	579	Coss.	P. Mucius Q. f. P. n. Scaevula; M. Aimilius M. f. M. n. Lepidus II	
174	580	Coss. Censs.	Sp. Postumius A. f. A. n. Albin. Paullul. Q. Mucius Q. f. P. n. Scaevula; Q. Fulvius Q. f. M. n. Flaccus; A. Postumius A. f. A. n. Albinus	l. f. LI
173	581	Coss.	L. Postumius A. f. A. n. Albinus; M. Popillius P. f. P. n. Laenas	DXXC
172	582	Coss.	C. Popillius P. f. P. n. Laenas; P. Ailius P. f. P. n. Ligus ambo primi de plebe	
171	583	Coss.	P. Licinius C. f. P. n. Crassus; C. Cassius C. f. C. n. Longinus	Bellum Persicum
170	584	Coss.	A. Hostilius L. f. A. n. Mancinus; A. Atilius C. f. C. n. Serranus	
169	585	Coss. Censs.	Q. Marcius L. f. Q. n. Philippus II; Cn. Servilius Cn. f. Cn. n. Caepio; C. Claudius Ap. f. P. n. Pulcher; Ti. Sempronius P. f. Ti. n. Gracchus	l. f. LII
168	586	Coss.	L. Aimilius L. f. M. n. Paullus II; C. Licinius C. f. P. n. Crassus	
167	587	Coss.	Q. Ailius P. f. Q. n. Paetus; M. Junius M. f. M. n. Pennus	
166	588	Coss.	C. Sulpicius C. f. C. n. Galus; M. Claudius M. f. M. n. Marcellus	
165	589	Coss.	T. Manlius A. f. T. n. Torquatus; Cn. Octavius Cn. f. Cn. n.	
164	590	Coss. Censs.	A. Manlius A. f. T. n. Torquatus; Q. Cassius L. f. Q. n. Longinus in m. m. e. L. Aimilius L. f. M. n. Paullus; Q. Marcius L. f. Q. n. Philippus	l. f. LIII
163	591	Coss.	Ti. Sempronius P. f. Ti. n. Gracchus II; M'. Juventius T. f. T. n. Thalna	DXC
162	592	Coss.	P. Cornelius P. f. Cn. n. Scipio Nasica vitio facti abdicarunt C Marcius C. f. Q. n. Figulus vitio facti abdicarunt in eorum loc. facti sunt P. Cornelius L. f. L. n. Lentulus; Cn. Domitius Cn. f. L. n. Ahenobarb.	
161	593	Coss.	M. Valerius M. f. M. n. Messalla; C. Fannius C. f. C. n. Strabo	
160	594	Coss.	L. Anicius L. f. L. n. Gallus; M. Cornelius C. f. C. n. Cethegus	
159	595	Coss. Censs.	Cn. Cornelius Cn. f. Cn. n. Dolabell. M. Fulvius M. f. M. n. Nobilior; P. Cornelius P. f. Cn. n. Scipio Nasica; M. Popillius P. f. P. n. Laenas	l. f. LIIII
158	596	Coss.	M. Aimilius M'. f. M'. n. Lepidus; C. Popillius P. f. P. n. Laenas II	
157	597	Coss.	Sex. Julius Sec. f. L. n. Caesar; L. Aurelius L. f. L. n. Orestes	
156	598	Coss.	L. Cornelius Cn. f. L. n. Lentul. Lupus; C. Marcius C. f. Q. n. Figulus II	
155	599	Coss.	P. Cornelius P. f. Cn. n. Scipio Nasic. II; M. Claudius M. f. M. n. Marcell. II	
154	600	Coss. Censs.	Q. Opimius Q. f. Q. n. L. Postumius Sp. f. L. n. Albin. in m. m. e. in e. l. f. e. M'. Acilius M'. f. C. n. Glabrio; M. Valerius M. f. M. n. Messalla; C. Cassius C. f. C. n. Longinus	lustr. f. LV
153	601	Coss.	[Q. Fulvius M. f. M.] n. Nobilior; T. Annius T. [f. — n. Luscu]s	[DC]
152	602	Coss.	[M. Claudius M. f.] m. n. Marcellus III; L. Valerius L. f. P. [n. Flaccus in m]ag. m. e.	
151	603	Coss.	[L. Licinius — f. —] n. Lucullus; A. Postumius A. f. A. [n. Al]binus	
150	604	Coss.	[T. Quinctius T. f. T.] n. Flaminin. M'. Acilius L. f. K. n. Balbus	
149	605	Coss.	[L. Marci]us C. [f. C.] n. Censorinus; M'. Manilius P. f. P. n.	Bellum Punicum tertium
148	606	Coss.	[Sp. Po]stumius [Sp. f. Sp. n.] Albinus Magnus; L. Calpurnius C. f. C. n. Piso [Cae]sonin.	
147	607	Coss. Censs.	P. Cornelius [P. f. P n. Scipio] African. Aimil. C. Livius M. Aemiliani f. M. [n. D]rusus; L. Cor[nelius Cn. f. L.] n. Lentulus Lupus; L. Marcius C. f. C. n. Censorin.	[l. f. LVI]
146	608	Coss.	Cn. Cor[nelius Cn. f. L. n.] Lentulus; L. Mummius L. f. L. n.	
145	609	Coss.	Q. Fabius [Q. f. Q. n. Maximu]s Aimilian. L. Hostilius L. [f.] L. n. [Ma]ncinus	
144	610	Coss.	Ser. Sulpi[cius Ser? f. P? n.] Galba; L. Aurelius [L? f. C?] n. Cotta	
143	611	Coss.	Ap. Clau[dius C. f. Ap. n. Pu]lcher; Q. Caeciliu[s Q. f. L. n. Metell.] Macedon.	DCX
142	612	Coss. Censs.	L. Caeci[lius Q. f. L. n. Metellus Ca]lvus; Q. Fabius Q. [f. Q. n. Maximus Se]rvilian. [P. Cornelius P. f. P. n. Scipio Afr]ican. Aimilia[n.] [L. Mummius L. f. L. n.]	[l.] f. LVII
141	613	Coss.	C[n. Servilius Cn. f. Cn. n. Caepio] Q. Pompeius A. f. [— nepos]	
140	614	Coss.	[C. Laelius C. f. C. n.] Q. Servilius Cn. f. C[n. n. Caepi]o	
139	615	Coss.	[Cn. Calpurnius — f. — n. Piso] [M. P]op[ill]ius M. f. P. n. [Laenas]	
138	616	Coss.	[P. Cornelius P. f. P. n. Scipio Nasica] [D. Junius M.] f. M. n. Brutu[s qui postea] Cal[l]aicus appel[latus est]	
137	617	Coss.	[M. Aimilius M. f. — n. Lepidus Porcina] [C. Ho]stilius A. f. L. n. Manci[nus]	
136	618	Coss. Censs.	[L. Furius — f. — n. Philus] [Sex.] Atilius M. f. C. n. Serran[us] [Ap. Claudius C. f. Ap. n. Pulcher [Q. Fulv]ius M. f. M. n. Nobilior	l. f. LVIII
135	619	Coss.	[Ser. Fulvius Q. f. Cn. n. Flaccus] [Q. Ca]lpurnius C. [f. C. n.] Piso	
134	620	Coss.	[P. Cornelius P. f. P. n. Scipio African. Aimil. II] [C. Ful]vius Q. f. Cn. [n.] Flaccus	
133	621	Coss.	P. Muc[ius P. f. Q. n. Scaevula] L. Calpurnius [L. f. C. n. Piso] Fru[gi]	DCXX
132	622	Coss.	P. Popi[ll]ius C. f. P. [n. Laenas] P. Rupilius P. f. P. n.	
131	623	Coss. Censs.	P. Lici[ni]us P. f. P. n. Cr[assus Mucianus] [L.] Valeri[us L. f. L. n. Flaccus] [Q.] Caecili[us Q. f. L. n. Metell. Macedonic.] [Q. Pompeius A. f. — n. ambo primi de plebe	[l. f. LVIIII]
130	624	Coss.	L. [Cornelius — f. — n. Lentulus [...] [in e. l. f. e. M. Perperna M. f. L? n.] [Ap. Claudius — f. — n. Nero?]	
			[Years 129–112 missing]	
111	643	Coss.	[P. Cornelius P. f. P. n. Scipio Nasica] [L. Calpurnius — f. — n. Bes]tia	
110	644	Coss.	[M. Mincius Q. f. — n. Rufus] Sp. Postumius — f. — n. Albi]nus	
109	645	Coss. Censs.	[Q. Caecilius L. f. Q. n. Metellus qui postea Numidicus appellatus est] [M. Junius D. Manliani f. D. n. Sil]anus [M. Aimilius M. f. L. n. Scaurus coact. abd.] [M. Livius C. f. M. Aimiliani n. Drusus] in mag. m. e.	
108	646	Coss. Censs.	[Ser. Sulpicius Ser? f. Ser? n. Galba] [L? Hortensius — f. — n. in mag. da]mn. e. in e. l. f. e. [M. Aurelius — f. — n.] Scaurus [C. Licinius P. f. — n. Getha] [Q. Fabius Q. Serviliani f. Q. n. Max. Eburn.]	[l.] f. LXIII
107	647	Coss.	[L. Cassius L. f. — n. Longinus] [C. Marius] C. f. C. n[epos]	
106	648	Coss.	[C. Atilius Sex? f. M? n. Serranus] [Q. Servi]lius Cn. f. Cn. [n. Caepio]	
105	649	Coss.	[P. Rutilius P. f. — n. Rufus] [Cn. Malliu]s Cn. f. M[aximus]	
			[Years 104–101 missing]	

=== First century BC ===
Year BC	Year AUC	Magistracy	Names	Notes
			[Year 100 missing]	
99	655	Coss.	M. Antonius M. f. M. [n.] A. Po[stumius — f. — n. Albinus]	
98	656	Coss.	Q. Caecilius Q. f. Q. n. M[e]tellus Nepos; T. Didi[us T. f. Sex. n.]	
97	657	Coss. Censs.	Cn. Cornelius Cn. f. Cn. n. Lentulus; P. Licini[us M. f. P. n. Crassus] L. Valerius L. f. [L.] n. Flaccus; M. Anton[ius M. f. M. n.]	[lustr. f. LXV]
96	658	Coss.	Cn. Domitius Cn. f. Cn. n. Ahenobarb. C. Cassius L. f. [— n. Longinus]	
95	659	Coss.	L. Licinius L. f. C. n. Crassus; Q. Mucius P. f. [P. n. Scaevula]	
94	660	Coss.	C. Coelius C. f. C. n. Caldus; L. Domitius Cn. [f. Cn. n. Ahenobarbus]	
93	661	Coss.	C. Valerius C. f. L. n. Flaccus; M. Herennius M. [f. ...]	DCLX
92	662	Coss. Censs.	C. Claudius Ap. f. C. n. Pulcher; M. Perperna M. [f. M. n.] Cn. Domitius Cn. f. Cn. n. Ahenobarb. L. Licinius L. [f. C. n. Crassus abd.]	
91	663	Coss.	L. Marcius Q. f. Q. n. Philippus; Sex. Julius C. f. [L. n. Caesar]	
90	664	Coss.	L. Julius L. f. S[e]x. n. Caesar; P. Rutilius L. f. L. n. [Lupus in pr. occ. e.]	Bellum Marsicum
89	665	Coss. Censs.	Cn. Pompeiu[s S]ex. f. Cn. n. Strabo; L. Porcius M. f. M. [n. Cato in pr. occ. e.] P. Licin[ius] M. f. P. n. Crassus; L. Julius L. f. Sex. n. [Caesar]	[lustrum f. LXVI]
88	666	Coss.	L. Corne[lius L. f. P. n. Sulla] qui postea [Felix appellatus est] Q. Pompeius [Q. f. A. n. Rufus in m. occ. e.]	
87	667	Coss.	C[n. Octavius Cn. f. Cn. n. in mag.] occ. e. L. Corn[elius L. f. L. n. Cinna coact. abd.] [e. l. f. e. L. Cornelius — f. — n. Merula abd.]	
86	668	Coss. Censs.	L. Cornelius L. f. L. n. Cinna II; C. M[arius C. f. C. n. VII in m. m. e.] [in e. l. f. e.] L. [Valerius C? f. L. n. Flaccus] L. Marcius Q. f. Q. n. Philippus; M. Per[perna M. f. M. n.]	[lustrum f. LXVII]
85	669	Coss.	L. Cornelius L. f. L. n. Cinna III; Cn. [Papirius Cn. f. C. n. Carbo]	
84	670	Coss.	Cn. [Papirius Cn. f. C. n. Carbo solus consulatum gessit] L. Co[rnelius L. f. L. n. Cinna IIII in m. occ. e.]	
83	671	Coss.	L. Cornelius L. f. L. n. Scipio Asiaticus; C. No[rbanus ...]	DCLXX
82	672	Coss. Dict. Mag. Eq.	C. Marius C. f. C. n. in mag. occis. est Cn. P[apirius Cn. f. C. n. Carbo III in m. occ. e.] L. Cornelius L. f. P. n. Sulla Felix; L. Valerius L. f. L. n. Flaccus	[rei publ. constit. causa]
81	673	Coss.	M. Tullius M. f. A. n. Decula; Cn. C[ornelius Cn. f. Cn. n. Dolabella]	
80	674	Coss.	L. Cornelius L. f. P. n. Sulla Felix II; Q. Ca[ecilius Q. f. L. n. Metellus Pius]	
79	675	Coss.	P. Servilius C. f. M. n. Vatia qui postea Isauricus appellatus est Ap. C[laudius Ap. f. C. n. Pulcher]	
78	676	Coss.	M. Aimilius Q. f. M. n. Lepidus; Q. Lut[ati]us Q. f. [Q. n.] Catulu[s]	
77	677	Coss.	D. Junius D. f. M. n. Brutus; Mamercus [Ai]miliu[s Mam. f. — n. Lepi]d. Livia[nus]	
76	678	Coss.	Cn. Octavius M. f. Cn. n. C. Scr[ib]onius [C. f. — n.] Cur[io]	
75	679	Coss.	L. Octavius Cn. f. Cn. n. C. Aur[el]ius M. f. [— n. C]ot[ta]	
74	680	Coss.	L. [Liciniu]s L. f. L. n. Lucullus; M. Au[re]lius M. [f. — n. Cotta]	
73	681	Coss.	M. [Teren]tius M. f. [— n. Var]r. Lucullus; C. Ca[ssiu]s L. f. [— n. Longinus]	DCXXC
			[Years 72–61 missing]	
60	694	Coss.	[Q. Cae]ci[lius Q. f. Q. n. Metellus Celer] [L. Afranius A. f.]	
59	695	Coss.	[C.] Julius C. f. C. n. [Caesar] [M. Calpurnius C. f. — n. Bibulus]	
58	696	Coss.	L. Calpurnius L. f. L. n. Pi[so Caesonin.] [A. Gabinius A. f. — n.]	
57	697	Coss.	P. Cornelius P. f. C[n. n. Lentul. Spinther] [Q. Caecilius Q. f. Q. n. Metellus Nepos]	
56	698	Coss.	Cn. Cornelius [P. f. — n. Lentul. Marcellin.] [L. Marcius L. f. Q. n. Philippus]	
			[Years 55–50 missing]	
49	705	Coss. Dict.	C. Claudius M. f. M. n. Marcellus; L. Cor[nelius P. f. — n. Lentulus Crus] eodem anno C. Julius C. f. C. n. Caesar sine mag. eq.	[comit. habend. c.]
48	706	Coss. Dict. Mag. Eq.	C. Julius C. f. C. n. Caesar II; P. Ser[vilius P. f. C. n. Vatia Isauricus] C. Julius C. f. C. n. Caesar II eodem anno [M. Antonius M. f. M. n.]	[rei gerundae causa]
47	707	Coss.	Q. Fufius Q. f. C. n. Calenus; P. Vat[inius P. f.]	
46	708	Coss. Dict. Mag. Eq.	C. Julius C. f. C. n. Caesar III; M. A[imilius M. f. Q. n. Lepidus] C. Julius C. f. C. n. Caesar III eodem anno M. Aimilius M. f. Q. n. Lepidus eodem anno	[rei gerundae causa]
45	709	Coss. Dict. Mag. Eq.	C. Julius C. f. C. n. Caesar IIII sine c[ollega; abd.] eodem anno Q. Fabius Q. f. Q. n. Maximus in mag. mortuus est in eius l. f. est C. Caninius C. f. C. n. Rebilus; C. Tre[bonius C. f. — n.] C. Julius C. f. C. n. Caes[a]r IIII abd. M. Aimilius M. [f. Q. n Lepidus II abd.]	[rei gerundae causa]
44	710	Dict. Mag. Eq. Mag. Eq. designatus Mag. Eq. Coss.	[C. Julius C. f. C. n. Caesar in perpetuum [M. Aimilius M. f. Q. n. Lepidus III [C. Octavius C. f. C. n. qui postea Imp. Caesar divi f. appellatus est ut qum M. [Lep]idus paludatu[s exiisset iniret non iniit] Cn. Domitius M. f. M. n. Calvin[us] in insequentem ann[um ... designatus] erat non iniit C. Julius C. f. C. n. Caesar V [in m. occ. e.] [in e. l. f. e.] P. Cor[nelius P. f. — n. Dolabella] [M. Antonius M. f. M. n.]	[rei gerundae causa]
43	711	Coss.	C. Vibius C. f. [C. n. Pansa Caetronianus] in [mag. mortuus est] [in. e. l. f. est] C. Julius C. f. [C. n. Caesar qui] postea Imp. [Caesar divi f. appel. est; abd. in. [e. l. f. e. C. Carrinas C. f. — n.] [A. Hirtius A. f. — n. in mag. mortuus est] [in e. l. f. e. Q. Pedius M. f. in mag. mortuus est] [in e. l. f. e. P. Ventidius P. f. postea quam praetura abiit]	[DCCX]
			[Years 42–38 missing]	
37	717	IIIviri Coss.	M. Aimilius M. f. [Q. n. Lepidus II] M. Antonius M. f. [M. n. II] Imp. Caesar divi [f. C. n. II] M. Agrippa L. f. [L. Caninius L. f. — n. Gallus abd.] [in. e. l. f. e. T. Statilius T. f. Taurus]	[rei publ. constit. causa]
36	718	Coss.	L. G[elliu]s L. f. L. n. [Poplicola ab]d. in. e[ius loc. factus est L. Nonius] L. [f. T. n. Asprenas] [M. Cocceius — f. — n. Nerva abd.] [in eius loc. factus est — Marcius — f. — n.	
			[Years 35–27 missing]	
26	728	Coss.	[Imp. Caesar divi f. C. n. Augustus VIII] T. Statil[ius T. f. Taurus] II	
25	729	Coss.	[Imp. C]aesar di[vi f. C. n. Augustus VIIII] M. Jun[ius M. f. D. n.] Silanu[s]	
24	730	Coss.	[Imp.] Caesar divi f. C. n. Au[g]ustus X C. No[rbanus C. f. C. n.] Flaccus	
23	731	Coss.	[Imp.] Caesar divi f. C. n. Augustus XI abd. in eius loc. factus est [L. Sestius P. f. L. n.] Quirin. [Albin.] A. T[erenius A. f. — n. Var]ro Murena [in mag. damn. est in e. l. f. e. [Cn. Calpurn]ius Cn. f. C. n. Pis[o] [Imp. Caesar divi f. C. n. Augustus postea quam consu]latu se abdicavit tri[b. pot. accepit]	[DCCXXX]
22	732	Coss. Censs.	[M. Claudius M. f. M. n. Marcellus] [L. Arru]ntius L. f. L. n. [Im[ Caesar divi f. C. n. Augustus tribi]nic. potestat. [L. Munatius L. f. L. n. Plancus] [Paullus Ai]milius L. f. M. n. Lepid[us]	
			[Years 21–13 missing]	
12	742	Coss.	[M. Valerius M. f. — n. Messalla] Appian. in [mag. mort. est] [in eius] l. f. e. [C. Valgius C. f. — n. Ruf. abd. [i]n e. l. f. e. [C. Caninius C. f.] C. n. Rebil. m. e. [Imp. Caesar divi f. C. n. Augustus tribunic. potest. XI] [M. Agrippa L. f. tribunic. potest. VI in hoc honore m. e.] P. Su[lpicius P. f. — n. Quirinus abd.] [in eius loc. factus est L. Volusius Q. f. — n. Saturninus]	
			[Years 11–1 missing]	

=== First century AD ===
Year AD	Year AUC	Magistracy	Names	Notes
1	754	Coss.	[Imp. Caesar divi f. Augustus pont. max. tr. potest. XXIII] C. Caesar August[i f. divi n.] [L. Aemilius Paulli f. L. n.] Paullus ex K. Jul. M. Herennius M. f. M'. n. Picens	
2	755	Coss.	Imp. Caesar divi f. Augustus pontif. max. tr. potest. XXIIII; P. Vinicius M. f. P. n. P. Alfenus P. f. P. n. Varus ex K. Jul. P. Cornelius Cn. f. Cn. n. Scipio; T. Quinctius T. f. T. n. [Crispi]nus Val[erianus]	
3	756	Coss.	Imp. Caesar divi f. Augustus pontif. m[ax. tr. pot]est. XXV; L. Aelius L. f. L. n. Lamia; M. Serviliu[s M. f. — n.] ex K. Jul. P. Silius P. f. P. [n.] L. Volusius L. f. Q. [n. Saturni]n.	
4	757	Coss.	Imp. Caesar divi f. Augustus pontif. [max. tr. potest. X]XVI; Sex. Aelius Q. f. L. n. Catus; C. Senti[us C. f. C. n. Sa]turn. ex K. Jul. Cn. Sentius C. f. C. n. S[a]turnin. C. Clodius C. f. C. n. Licinus	
5	758	Coss.	Imp. Caesar divi f. Augustus pontif. max. tr. pot. XXVII; Ti. Caesar Augusti f. divi n. tribun. potest. VI; L. Valerius Potiti f. M. n. Messalla Volesus; Cn. Cornelius L. f. Magni Pompei n. Cinna Mag. ex K. Jul. C. Vibius C. f. C. n. Postimus; C. Ateius L. f. L. n. Capito	
6	759	Coss.	Imp. Caesar divi f. Augustus pontif. max. tr. potest. XXIIX; Ti. Caesar Augusti f. divi n. tribun. potest. VII; M. Aemiliu[s] Paulli f. L. n. Lepidus; L. Arruntius L. f. L. n. ex K. Jul. L. Nonius L. f. L. n. Asprenas	
7	760	Coss.	Imp. Caesar divi f. Augustus pontif. max. tr. pot. XXIX; Ti. Caesar Augusti f. divi n. tribun. potest. VIII; Q. Caecilius Q. f. M. n. Metellus Creticus Silan. A. Licinius A. f. A. n. Nerva Silianus [ex. K. Jul. — Lucilius — f. — n. Longus]	
8	761	Coss.	Imp. Caesar divi f. Augustus pon[t. ma]x. tr. pot. XXX; Ti. Caesar Augusti f. divi n. tribun. potest. IX; M. Furius P. f. P. n. Camillus; Sex. Nonius L. f. L. n. Quinctilianus ex K. Jul. L. Apronius C. f. C. n. A. Vibius C. f. C. n. Habitus	[DCCLX]
9	762	Coss.	Imp. Caesar divi f. Augustus pont. max. tr. pot. XXXI; Ti. Caesar Aug. f. divi n. trib. potest. X C. Poppaeus Q. f. Q. n. Sabinus; Q. Sulpicius Q. f. Q. n. Camerinus ex K. Jul. M. Papius M. f. N. n. Mutilus; Q. Poppaeus Q. f. Q. n. Secund.	
10	763	Coss.	Imp. Caesar divi f. Augustus pont. max. tr. pot. XXXII; Ti. Caesar Augusti f. divi n. trib. potest. XI; P. Cornelius P. f. P. n. Dolabella; C. Junius C. f. M. n. Silanus flam. Mart. ex K. Jul. Ser. Cornelius Cn. f. Cn. n. Lentul. Malug. flam. Dial. [Q. Junius — f. — n. Blaesus]	
11	764	Coss.	[Imp. Caes]ar div[i f. Augustus pont. max. tr. pot. XXXIII] [Ti. Caes]ar Augu[sti f. divi n. trib. potest. XII] [M'. Ae]milius Q. f. M. n. Lepidus [T. Statilius T. f. T. n. Taurus] [e]x K. Jul. L. Cassius L. f. [...] n. Longinus	
12	765	Coss.	[Imp. C]aesar divi f. Augustu[s pont. max. tr. pot. XXXIIII] [Ti. Caesar] Augusti f. divi n. [trib. potest. XIII] Germanicus Ca[esar] Ti. f. Augusti n. C. Fonteius C. f C. n. Capito ex K. Julis C. Visellius C. f. C. n. Varro	
13	766	Coss.	Imp. Caesar divi f. Augustus pont. max. tr. pot. XXXV; Ti. Caesar Augusti f. divi n. tr. pot. XIIII; C. Silius P. f. P. n. L. Munatius L. f. L. Plancus [ex K. Jul. A. Caecina Largus]	

=== Formulas and abbreviations ===
- abdicarunt ut decemviri consulari imperio fierent = abdicated for the appointment of decemvirs with consular imperium
- abdicavit (abd.) = he resigned, abdicated
- ambo primi de plebe = the first time both were from the plebeians
- Bellum Antiochinum = War with Antiochus
- Bellum Gallicum cisalpinum = War with the Cisalpine Gauls
- Bellum Marsicum = Marsic or Social War
- Bellum Persicum = War with Perseus (Third Macedonian War)
- Bellum Philippicum = War with Philip (Second Macedonian War)
- Bellum Punicum primum/secundum/tertium = First/Second/Third Punic War
- clavi figendi causa = to drive a nail into the wall of the temple of Jupiter Optimus Maximus on the Capitol, a sacred rite invoked in times of emergency
- comitiorum habendorum causa = to call the comitia, usually for the election of new magistrates.
- decemviri consulari imperio legibus scribundis facti eodem anno = decemvirs with consular imperium to record the laws were appointed (elected) the same year
- hoc anno dictator et magister equitum sine consulibus fuerunt = this year the dictator and magister equitum [continued] without consuls.
- in eius locum factus est (in loc. f. e.) = in his place was chosen (elected, appointed)
- in magistratu damnatus est (in mag. damn. e.) = he was condemned in [his] magistracy
- in magistratu mortuus est (in mag. mort. e., in m. m. e.) = he died in [his] magistracy
- in magistratu occisus est (in mag. occ. e.) = he was slain in [his] magistracy
- in proelio occisus est = he was slain in the war
- interregni causa = due to the interregnum
- Latinarum feriarum causa = to hold the Latin festival
- lustrum fecerunt (l. f.) [numeral] = the x th lustrum (the census) was made (held, taken)
- postea quam dictatura/censura abiit = after leaving the dictatorship/censorship
- primus e plebe = the first from among the plebeians
- quaestionum exercendarum causa = to pursue an investigation
- qui (in hoc honore) postea [name] appellatus est = who (in his honour) was afterward called [name]
- qui scriba fuerat = who had been a scribe
- rei gerundae causa (r. g. c.) = to perform a task, usually a military command
- rei publicae constituendae causa = to reform the constitution of the Republic
- seditionis sedandae = to quell sedition
- senatus legendi causa = to fill up the roll of the senate
- sine collega = without a colleague
- sine magister equitum = without a magister equitum
- solus consulatum gessit = the sole consul elected
- tribunicia potestate = holding the tribunician power (the power to veto or forbid an action of the magistrates)
- vitio facti abdicarunt = they resigned due to a vitium, a fault in the auspices

== See also ==
- List of Roman consuls
- List of Roman dictators

== Bibliography ==
- Marcus Tullius Cicero, De Oratore.
- Diodorus Siculus, Bibliotheca Historica (Library of History).
- Titus Livius (Livy), History of Rome.
- Theodor Mommsen et alii, Corpus Inscriptionum Latinarum (The Body of Latin Inscriptions, abbreviated CIL), Berlin-Brandenburgische Akademie der Wissenschaften (1853–present).
- Dictionary of Greek and Roman Antiquities, William Smith, ed., Little, Brown, and Company, Boston (1859).
- René Cagnat et alii, L'Année épigraphique (The Year in Epigraphy, abbreviated AE), Presses Universitaires de France (1888–present).
- James Chidester Egbert, Introduction to the Study of Latin Inscriptions, American Book Company, New York (1895).
- Harper's Dictionary of Classical Literature and Antiquities, Harry Thurston Peck, ed. (Second Edition, 1897).
- Rodolfo Lanciani, New Tales of Old Rome, Macmillan & Company, London (1901).
- John Sandys, Latin Epigraphy: an Introduction to the Study of Latin Inscriptions, University of Chicago Press (1927).
- T. Robert S. Broughton, The Magistrates of the Roman Republic, American Philological Association (1952–1986).
- Oxford Classical Dictionary, N. G. L. Hammond and H. H. Scullard, eds., Clarendon Press, Oxford (Second Edition, 1970).
- Timothy J. Cornell, The Beginnings of Rome: Italy and Rome from the Bronze Age to the Punic Wars (c. 1000–264 BC), Routledge, London (1995).
