= 97 BC =

97 BC in various calendars
- Gregorian calendar: 97 BC; XCVII BC
- Ab urbe condita: 657
- Ancient Egypt era: XXXIII dynasty, 227
- Pharaoh: Ptolemy X Alexander, 11
- Ancient Greek Olympiad (summer): 170th Olympiad, year 4
- Assyrian calendar: 4654
- Balinese saka calendar: N/A
- Bengali calendar: −690 – −689
- Berber calendar: 854
- Buddhist calendar: 448
- Burmese calendar: −734
- Byzantine calendar: 5412–5413
- Chinese calendar: 癸未年 (Water Goat); 2601 or 2394 — to — 甲申年 (Wood Monkey); 2602 or 2395
- Coptic calendar: −380 – −379
- Discordian calendar: 1070
- Ethiopian calendar: −104 – −103
- Hebrew calendar: 3664–3665
- Hindu calendars
- Vikram Samvat: −40 – −39
- Shaka Samvat: N/A
- Kali Yuga: 3004–3005
- Holocene calendar: 9904
- Iranian calendar: 718 BP – 717 BP
- Islamic calendar: 740 BH – 739 BH
- Javanese calendar: N/A
- Julian calendar: N/A
- Korean calendar: 2237
- Minguo calendar: 2008 before ROC 民前2008年
- Nanakshahi calendar: −1564
- Seleucid era: 215/216 AG
- Thai solar calendar: 446–447
- Tibetan calendar: ཆུ་མོ་ལུག་ལོ་ (female Water-Sheep); 30 or −351 or −1123 — to — ཤིང་ཕོ་སྤྲེ་ལོ་ (male Wood-Monkey); 31 or −350 or −1122

Year 97 BC was a year of the pre-Julian Roman calendar. At the time it was known as the Year of the Consulship of Lentulus and Crassus (or, less frequently, year 657 Ab urbe condita) and the Fourth Year of Tianhan. The denomination 97 BC for this year has been used since the early medieval period, when the Anno Domini calendar era became the prevalent method in Europe for naming years.

== Events ==
=== By place ===
==== Roman Republic ====
- Consuls: Gnaeus Cornelius Lentulus and Publius Licinius Crassus.
- C. Decianus, the prosecutor of Furius, is himself condemned for his remarks about the death of Saturninus.
- The Romans subdue the Maedi and Dardani.
- L. Domitius takes harsh measures to restore order in Sicily.
- The censors, Flaccus and Antonius, remove M. Duronius from the senate because of his opposition to sumptuary laws.
- A decree of the Roman Senate bans human sacrifices.
- Sulla displays a lion hunt for the first time in games at Rome.

==== Asia Minor ====
- Ariarathes VIII is forced out of Cappadocia by Mithridates, and dies soon afterwards.

==== China ====
- The Han generals Li Guangli, Gongsun Ao, Han Yue and Lu Bode lead armies into Xiongnu territory. The campaign achieves little, and Gongsun Ao suffers a defeat. Emperor Wu of Han condemns him to death due to his troops suffering heavy losses, but he escapes by feigning his death. He is eventually discovered and executed during the witchcraft trials of 91 BC.

==== Japan ====
- Sujin becomes emperor of Japan (approximate date).

== Births ==
- Appius Claudius Pulcher, Roman consul (d. 49 BC)
