= Duronia gens =

Ancient Roman family

The gens Duronia was a plebeian family at ancient Rome. Although relatively obscure, the family was of sufficient importance to hold a seat in the Roman Senate. Its members are mentioned during the first and second centuries BC.

== Praenomina ==
The Duronii are known to have used the praenomina Lucius, Marcus, and Gaius.

== Branches and cognomina ==
None of the Duronii known to history bore any cognomen.

== Members ==
- Duronia, the mother of Publius Aebutius, married Titus Sempronius Rutilus, who disliked his stepson. Duronia attempted to initiate her son into the Bacchic rites, but he betrayed the existence of the Bacchanalia to the consuls, who suppressed them, in 186 BC.
- Lucius Duronius, praetor in 181 BC, received Apulia as his province. He was charged with investigating reports of the Bacchanalia, of which signs had been observed the previous year. Duronius was also required to investigate the Istri, and sailed to Illyria with ten ships, returning the following year and reporting that the Illyrian king Gentius was the cause of the piracy in the Adriatic.
- Marcus Duronius, as tribune, probably in 98 BC, had abolished a sumptuary law, using frivolous and reckless expressions, for which in 97 the censors Marcus Antonius and Lucius Valerius Flaccus ejected him from the Senate. In revenge, he brought an accusation of ambitus against the censor Antonius.
- Gaius Duronius, mentioned by Cicero as a friend of Titus Annius Milo.

== See also ==
- List of Roman gentes
