= Marcus Duronius =

Tribune of the plebs in the early 1st Century BCE

Marcus Duronius was a tribune of the plebs, most likely in 97 BC. He abrogated a sumptuary law, one of the Leges Liciniae. In retaliation, the Roman censors Lucius Valerius Flaccus and Marcus Antonius expelled him from the Senate. Duronius then brought an accusation of ambitus against Antonius.

== See also ==
- Duronia (gens), for other members of the family
