= Titus Didius =

Roman statesman, consul in 98 BC

Consul of the Roman Republic
- In office January 98 BC – December 98 BC
- Preceded by: Aulus Postumius Albinus and Marcus Antonius the Orator
- Succeeded by: Gnaeus Cornelius Lentulus and Publius Licinius Crassus

Personal details
- Born: Roman Republic
- Died: June 11, 89 BC

Military service
- Commands: The 101 BC campaign against the Scordisci; The 97-93 BC campaigns in Hispania against several Iberian and Celt-Iberian tribes and people

Titus Didius (also spelled Deidius in ancient times) was a politician and general of the Roman Republic. In 98 BC he became the first member of his family to be consul. He is credited with the restoration of the Villa Publica, and for his command in Hispania Citerior (the south-east of modern-day Spain). He held two Triumphs, one for his victories over the Scordisci, another for his victories in Spain.

== Family background ==
Titus Didius belonged to the plebeian gens Didia, which was relatively new in Roman politics. The first known member of the gens was his homonymous father, who passed a sumptuary law (the lex Didia) when he was tribune of the plebs in 143 BC. From his filiation given in the Fasti Capitolini, we also know that Didius' grandfather was named Sextus.

== Career ==
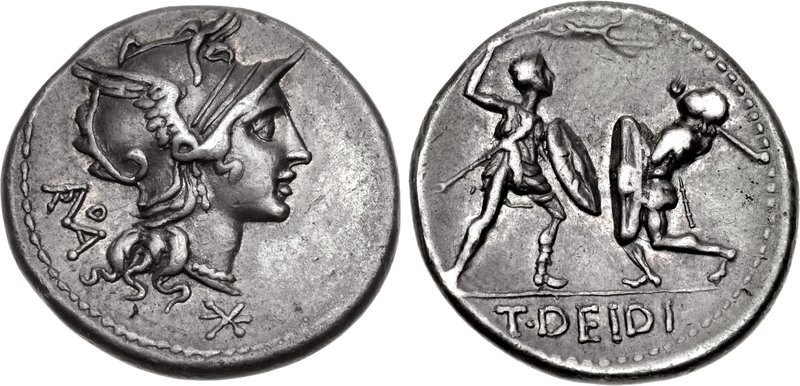
Denarius of Titus Didius, minted c. 113–112 BC. The obverse shows the head of Roma, while the reverse depicts two gladiators fighting. His name is spelled Deidius here.

=== Triumvir monetalis (c. 113–112 BC) ===
Titus Didius first appears in history as triumvir monetalis, one of the three men tasked with minting coins, probably in 113 or 112. The reverse of his denarii shows two gladiators fighting. Michael Crawford suggests that it may have been a political promise from Didius to offer gladiatorial shows, should he be elected curule aedile (the magistrate in charge of organising such games). It is not known whether Didius was subsequently elected.

=== Tribune of the Plebs (103 BC) ===
Titus Didius held office in 103 BC as a tribune of the Plebs. He is noted for attempting to veto fellow tribune Gaius Norbanus's prosecution of Quintus Servilius Caepio in the aftermath of the Battle of Arausio, which resulted in him being driven off from the proceedings by force.

=== Praetor (101 BC) ===
Two years later in 101 BC, he was elected a praetor. During this time he fought in Macedon, defeating the Scordisci and earning his first triumph upon his return in 100 BC.

=== Consul (98 BC) ===
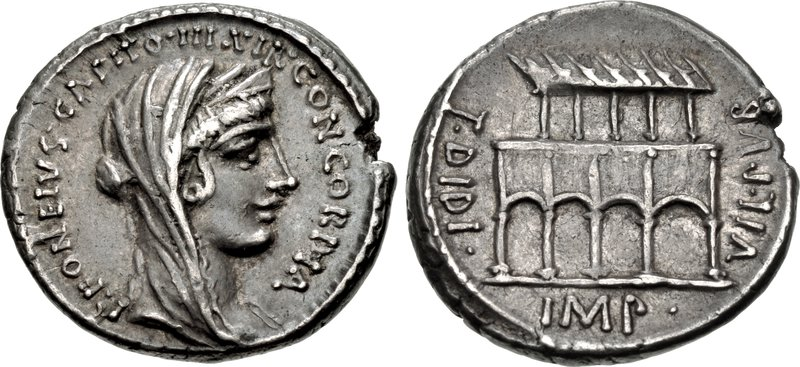
Denarius of Publius Fonteius Capito minted in 55 BC. The reverse depicts the Villa Publica, with on the left the name of Titus Didius, who restored the building in 98 BC.

In 98 BC Didius was elected consul alongside Quintus Caecilius Metellus Nepos. Along with restoring the Villa Publica, he enacted a law which disallowed combining two unrelated proposals in one bill.

=== Proconsul (97–93 BC) ===
After his term as consul, Didius was assigned to govern the province of Hispania Citerior as a proconsul, where he governed from 97 BC to 93 BC. Nearly his entire proconsular term in Spain was spent at war with the Celtiberi. In the four years Didius governed Spain, he achieved multiple victories and is said to have slain 20,000 Arevaci, quelled the rebellious city of Termes (today Tiermes in the province of Soria), and besieged Colenda for nine months, after which time the city fell and the women and children were sold into slavery. Didius earned another triumph after slaughtering a colony of "robbers"—in actuality, poor people who had banded together to subsist through banditry after losing their property. Didius lured them in with promises of land to live on, and when the families assembled within the Roman castra in good faith, he had them all killed. The historian Appian indicates that Didius's exceptional cruelty and treachery caused an even greater uprising which his experienced successor, Gaius Valerius Flaccus, had to put down.

The famous Roman rebel Quintus Sertorius served as a military tribune under Titus Didius in Spain. He was awarded the Grass Crown for crushing an insurrection in and around Castulo.

== Death (89 BC) ==
After concluding his service in Spain, Didius served as a legate in the Social War, under Lucius Julius Caesar in 90 BC, then Lucius Porcius Cato and Sulla in 89 BC. Shortly following a successful capture of Herculaneum, he died in battle on June 11, 89 BC.

== Bibliography ==
- T. Robert S. Broughton, The Magistrates of the Roman Republic, American Philological Association, 1951–1952.
- Michael Crawford, Roman Republican Coinage, Cambridge University Press, 1974.

Political offices
Preceded by Marcus Antonius; A. Postumius Albinus	Roman consul 98 BC; With: Q. Caecilius Metellus Nepos	Succeeded by Gn. Cornelius Lentulus; P. Licinius Crassus
