= Villa publica =

Ancient building in Rome

Coordinates: 41.8975°N 12.4791°E

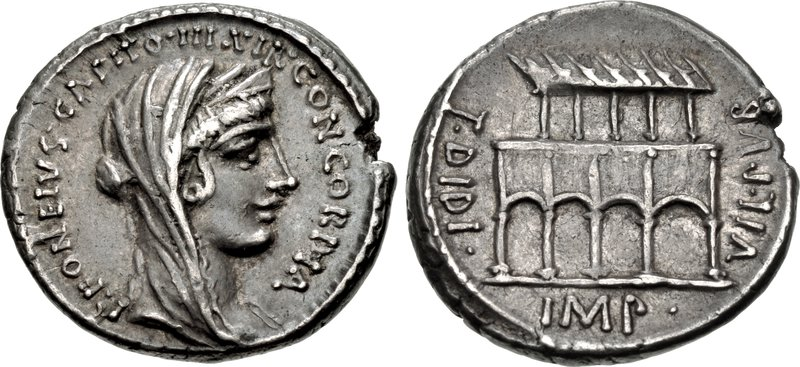
Denarius of Publius Fonteius Capito in 55 BC. The reverse depicts the Villa Publica, with on the left the name of Titus Didius, who restored the building in 98 BC.

The Villa publica was a public building in ancient Rome, which served as the censors’ base of operation. It was erected on the Campus Martius in 435 BC. According to Livy, the first census was compiled there the year it was built. In 194 BC, the building, or buildings, was restored and enlarged. The consul Titus Didius further restored the building in 98 BC. Villa publica meant "House of the People" and although its location is unknown (it has been conjectured that it actually constituted a series of buildings near the Circus Flaminius), it is known from ancient sources that its area was wide, and that, at one point, most likely following further renovations in 34 BC, a large wall was built around it. In addition to holding the censors’ records and acting as the censors’ base of operations, the Villa publica also served as a place where foreign ambassadors were greeted, where generals waited to hear if they would be granted a triumph, and it also acted as a base for army levies.

== Bibliography ==
- Michael Crawford, Roman Republican Coinage, Cambridge University Press, 1974.
