= Gnaeus Domitius Ahenobarbus (consul 96 BC) =

Roman consul in 96 and plebeian tribune in 104 BC

Gnaeus Domitius Ahenobarbus (died c. 89 BC) was tribune of the people in 104 BC. He was the son of Gnaeus Domitius Ahenobarbus, and brother of Lucius Domitius Ahenobarbus.

As tribune, he brought forward a law (lex Domitia de Sacerdotiis) by which the priests of the superior colleges were to be elected by the people in the Tribal Assembly (seventeen of the tribes voting) instead of by co-optation. Suetonius suggests there were personal reasons for enacting this legislation: he writes that Domitius was "enraged" after he failed to be appointed pontifex maximus, a position both Domitius' father and grandfather held. Elected tribune in 104, Domitius democratized the selection process for the pontificate, and was elected pontifex the following year (succeeding Lucius Caecilius Metellus Dalmaticus). The lex Domitia was later repealed by Sulla, but revived under Caesar.

Both during his tribunate and afterwards, he prosecuted several of his private enemies, such as Marcus Aemilius Scaurus (whom he blamed for not having been elected to the pontificate in the first place) and Marcus Junius Silanus.

He was elected consul in 96 BC and censor in 92 BC with Lucius Licinius Crassus the orator, with whom he was frequently at variance. They took joint action, however, in suppressing the recently established Latin rhetorical schools, which they regarded as injurious to public morality; in the words of Cicero, these were seen as 'schools of impudence'.

Their censorship was long celebrated for their disputes. Domitius was of a violent temper, and was moreover in favor of the ancient simplicity of living, while Crassus loved luxury and encouraged art. Among the many sayings recorded of both, we are told that Crassus observed, "that it was no wonder that a man had a beard of brass, who had a mouth of iron and a heart of lead." Cicero wrote that Domitius was not to be reckoned among the orators, but that he spoke well enough and had sufficient talent to maintain his high rank.

Ahenobarbus apparently died in 89 or early 88 BC, during the consulship of Sulla, and was succeeded as pontifex by Quintus Mucius Scaevola.

== Children ==
He had two sons: Gnaeus Domitius Ahenobarbus and Lucius Domitius Ahenobarbus.

== Bibliography ==
- Rüpke, Jörg, Fasti Sacerdotum: A Prosopography of Pagan, Jewish, and Christian Religious Officials in the City of Rome, 300 BC to AD 499, Oxford University Press, 2008. viii, 1107. ISBN 978-0-19-929113-7.
- Broughton, Thomas Robert Shannon (1952). The magistrates of the Roman republic. Vol. 2. New York: American Philological Association.

Religious titles
Preceded by L. Caecilius Metellus Delmaticus	Pontifex maximus of Rome; 103–88 BC	Succeeded by Q. Mucius Scaevola
Political offices
Preceded by Gn. Cornelius Lentulus; P. Licinius Crassus	Roman consul 96 BC; With: Gaius Cassius Longinus	Succeeded by L. Licinius Crassus; Q. Mucius Scaevola
Preceded by L. Valerius Flaccus; Marcus Antonius	Roman censor 92 BC; With: Lucius Licinius Crassus	Succeeded by P. Licinius Crassus; L. Julius Caesar
