= Aulus Postumius Albinus (consul 99 BC) =

Roman senator and general

- Born: c. 151 BC
- Died: 89 BC; Near Pompeii
- Cause of death: Lynched by mutinous troops
- Office: Consul (99 BC)

Military service
- Years of service: 110–109 and 89 BC
- Rank: Legatus
- Battles/wars: Jugurthine War; Marsic War

Aulus Postumius Albinus (c. 151 – 89 BC) was a Roman senator and military commander. In 110 BC, he went to serve on the staff of his brother, Spurius, in the war against the Numidian king Jugurtha. Left in charge of the troops during the winter, Aulus decided on a rash foray which involved the army in a humiliating defeat and surrender. The disaster led to the establishment of a commission which condemned several prominent aristocrats of collusion with the enemy during the war. Aulus himself was seemingly not condemned, and went on to be elected consul a decade later, in 99 BC. In 89, Aulus held command of a fleet during the Social War in Italy, but proved to be an unpopular commander and was murdered by his troops.

== Biography ==
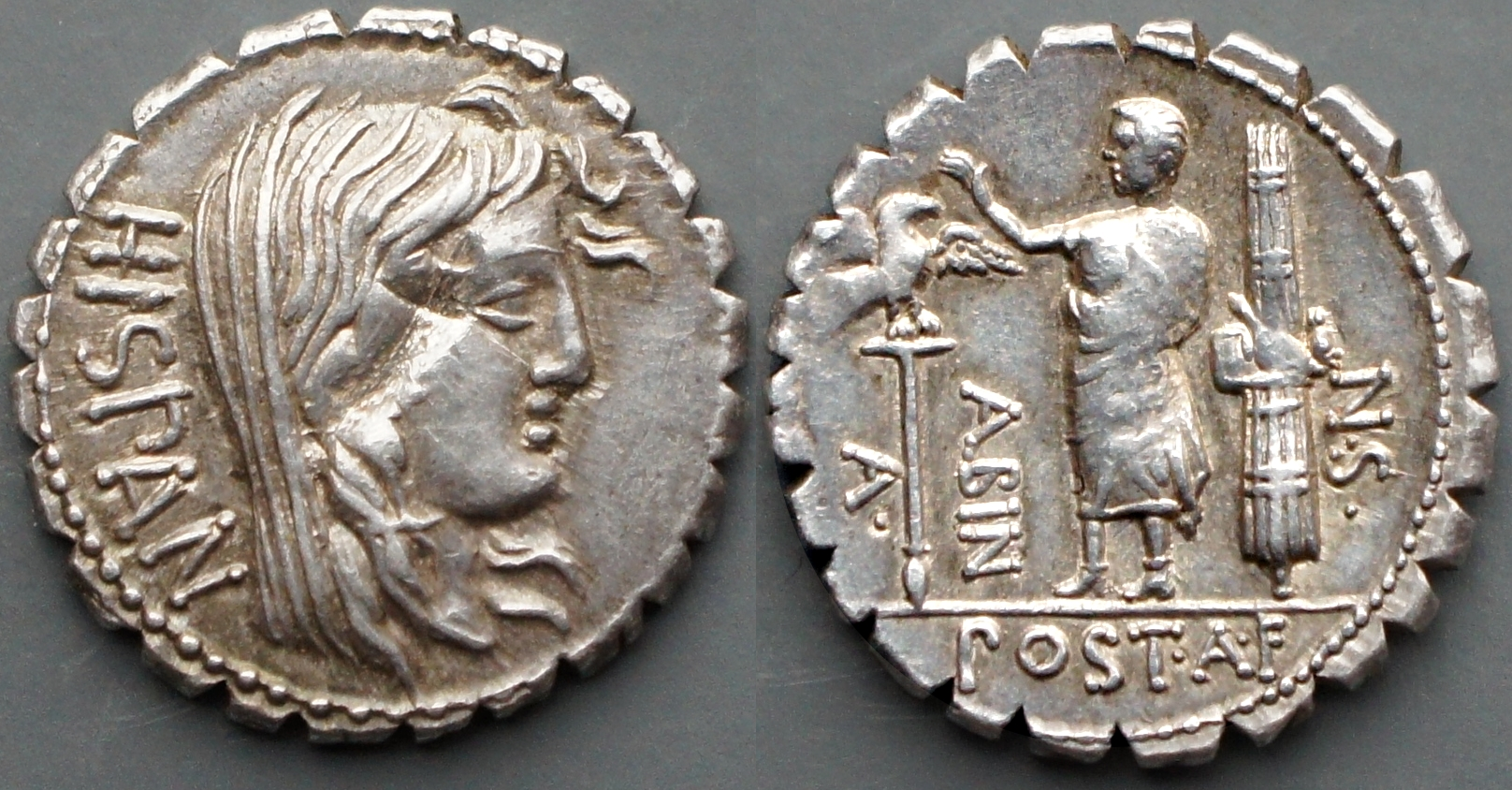
This coin is supposed by Joseph Hilarius Eckhel and others to refer to this Albinus. One side is a woman's head with the letters "HISPAN", perhaps a reference to his ancestor L. Albinus. The other side has a man and an eagle, a military standard; behind him the fasces with the axe, and the letters "A. POST. ABIN" (instead of "ALBIN").

Aulus Postumius Albinus belonged to a patrician family which had been prominent since the beginning of the Roman Republic. He was probably a son of Spurius Postumius Albinus Magnus, Roman consul in 148 BC. Aulus must have been born in or not long before 151 BC, and probably held the office of praetor by 111 BC. Cicero considered him a good public speaker.

In 110 BC, Aulus joined the staff of his older brother, the consul Spurius Postumius Albinus, as his pro-praetorian deputy (legatus pro praetore), in a military expedition against the Numidian king Jugurtha. Spurius accomplished little and eventually had to return to Rome and oversee the election of next year's magistrates, leaving Aulus in charge of the Roman camp in Numidia. Problems with the elections forced Spurius to linger in Italy longer than expected, and, in early 109, despite it being winter, Aulus allowed himself to be tempted into a bold military move on his own against the town of Suthul, where Jugurtha's treasury was located. After the Romans failed to immediately take the town, they were successfully lured away by Jugurtha into a devastating ambush. The King forced Aulus into a humiliating treaty, by which the Romans would pass under the yoke and leave Numidia within 10 days.

Aulus's treaty was quickly repudiated by the Roman Senate, and the disaster led a tribune of the plebs to set up a commission to investigate misconduct or treasonable behavior by magistrates in the Jugurthine war. Among those condemned was Aulus's brother, Spurius, who was blamed for his legate's blunder during his absence. There is no evidence Aulus himself was condemned, and he was in sufficiently good standing to be elected for the consulship of 99 BC, with the orator Marcus Antonius as his colleague. (Note: Münzer had no doubt that Aulus shared his brother's disgrace during the trials and thus could not be identified with the identically named consul of 99. There is no evidence, however, that Aulus was condemned, and later historians have preferred to identify the two.) It has been suggested that he owed his election to anti-demagogic feeling in the aftermath of the death of the populist tribune Saturninus. No actions of his during his term of office are known, and he was the last of the Postumii Albini to hold the consulship.

In 89 BC, Aulus was once again on military duty, (Note: Plutarch claimed the man in question was of praetorian rank, whereas Orosius said he was a former consul. Münzer rejected, once again, an identification with the consul of 99 BC, but later historians, following the testimony of Orosius, believed they should indeed be the same person.) serving as a legate of the general Sulla during the Social War. He was charged with command of the Roman fleet at the siege of Pompeii, blockading the harbor, but proved to be so unpopular with the troops that they stoned him to death. The surviving summary of Livy's History says the soldiers did so because they suspected Albinus of treacherous behavior. Orosius blamed the commander's intolerable arrogance for his demise, while the author Valerius Maximus maintained that there was nothing but baseless suspicions to justify the killing. Albinus's superior, Sulla, declined to punish the murderers and address the indiscipline in the army, allegedly because he was looking forward to his candidacy for the consulship of the following year.

== See also ==
- Postumia gens
- Albinus (cognomen)

== Citations ==
Political offices
Preceded by Gaius Marius VI; Lucius Valerius Flaccus	Roman consul 99 BC; With: Marcus Antonius	Succeeded by Q. Caecilius Metellus Nepos; Titus Didius
