= Quintus Caecilius Metellus Nepos (consul 98 BC) =

Ancient Roman nobleman and politician

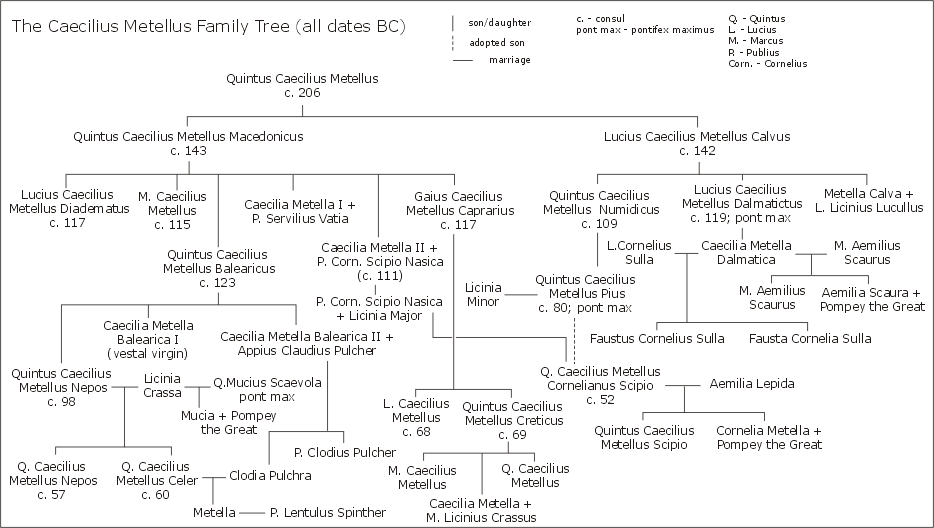
Caecilius Metellus family tree

Quintus Caecilius Metellus Nepos (c. 135 BC – 55 BC) was a senator and consul.

Metellus Nepos was a son of Quintus Caecilius Metellus Balearicus. He served as praetor some time before the year 100 BC and possibly as aedile c. 104 BC.

He was elected consul in 98 BC with Titus Didius as his colleague. During his consulship, he brought legislation, the leges Caeciliae-Didiae, which required bills brought before the assemblies to have only one topic and mandated that three market days must elapse between a bill's presentation and a vote thereon.

Metellus Nepos married Licinia Prima, after she had divorced the Pontifex Maximus Quintus Mucius Scaevola, with whom she had a daughter Mucia Tertia. Licinia and Metellus Nepos had two children:

- Quintus Caecilius Metellus Celer
- Quintus Caecilius Metellus Nepos

== See also ==
- Caecilia gens

== Sources ==
- Broughton, Thomas Robert Shannon (1952). The magistrates of the Roman republic. Vol. 2. New York: American Philological Association.
- Münzer, Fredrich (1897). "Caecilius 95" . Realencyclopädie der classischen Altertumswissenschaft (in German). Vol. III, 1. Stuttgart: Butcher. cols. 1216 – via Wikisource.

Political offices
Preceded by Marcus Antonius; Aulus Postumius Albinus	Roman consul 98 BC with Titus Didius	Succeeded by Gnaeus Cornelius Lentulus; Publius Licinius Crassus
