= Gnaeus Cornelius Lentulus (consul 97 BC) =

Gnaeus Cornelius Lentulus was a consul of the Roman Republic in 97 BC. He had been praetor by 100 BC. His consular colleague was Publius Licinius Crassus. During their consulship, the Roman Senate passed a decree banning human sacrifice. Despite the fame of the gens Cornelia and his attainment of Rome's highest office, little is known about this Lentulus.

Political offices
Preceded by Quintus Caecilius Metellus Nepos, and Titus Didius	Consul of the Roman Republic with Publius Licinius Crassus; 97 BC	Succeeded by Gaius Cassius Longinus, and Gnaeus Domitius Ahenobarbus
