= Gaius Cassius Longinus (consul 96 BC) =

Roman consul

Gaius Cassius Longinus was consul in 96 BC with Gnaeus Domitius Ahenobarbus. He stood for the plebeian tribunate in 104 BC but was unsuccessful; after his consulship, he may have been the Gaius Cassius which was to assume supreme command against the Marians in the Bellum Octavianum.

He is mentioned by Cicero as one of those persons elected consul without previously holding the aedileship.

Political offices
Preceded by Gnaeus Cornelius Lentulus and Publius Licinius Crassus	Consul of the Roman Republic with Gnaeus Domitius Ahenobarbus; 96 BC	Succeeded by Lucius Licinius Crassus and Quintus Mucius Scaevola Pontifex
