= Publius Licinius Crassus (consul 97 BC) =

Roman consul

Publius Licinius Crassus (died 87 BC) was a member of the respected and prominent Crassi branch of the plebeian gens Licinia as well as the father of the famous triumvir Marcus Licinius Crassus. His father was Marcus Licinius Crassus Agelastus and his brother Marcus Licinius Crassus served as a praetor in 107 BC.

Before his consulship, he proposed a law regulating expenses of the table, which was approved. He became consul in 97 BC. In his consulship, the Roman Senate abolished the practising of magic arts and human sacrifice. Between 97 BC and 93 BC, he served in Hispania Ulterior as governor and won a battle over the Lusitani, for which he was awarded and honoured with a triumph.

He served as a censor in 89 BC. As a censor, he banned foreign wines and unguents. He later became an electorate officer dividing new citizens into voting districts. His colleague was long-time friend Lucius Julius Caesar III.

Publius had a small house despite his immense wealth. His sons by his wife Venuleia were Publius Licinius Crassus (who died in the Social War), Lucius Licinius Crassus (killed in 87 BC) and Marcus Licinius Crassus, the triumvir. He remained with his family for the rest of his life, living long enough to see the two sons Publius and Lucius marry, as well as the birth of his first grandchild.

Conflict between Gaius Marius and Lucius Cornelius Sulla was escalating in the 80s BC. Although originally a supporter of Marius, Publius adopted a more neutral position opposed to the methods of both Marius and Sulla. He was killed, or committed suicide to avoid a more humiliating death, after the Marians took Rome in 87 BC.

== As author? ==
The geographer Strabo refers to a treatise on the Cassiterides, the semi-legendary Tin Islands regarded as situated somewhere near the west coasts of Europe, written by a Publius Crassus but not now extant. Several scholars of the 19th and early 20th centuries, including Theodor Mommsen and T. Rice Holmes, thought that this prose work resulted from an expedition during Publius's grandson's occupation of Armorica. Scholars of the 20th and early 21st centuries have been more inclined to assign authorship to the elder Publius, during his proconsulship in Spain in the 90s BC, in which case the grandson's Armorican mission may have been prompted in part by business interests and a desire to capitalize on the earlier survey of resources. Pothecary (2024) agrees that the Publius Crassus mentioned by Strabo is Publius Licinius Crassus, Roman commander in Iberia, 96–93 BCE.

== See also ==
- Licinia gens

Political offices
Preceded by Q. Caecilius Metellus Nepos; Titus Didius	Consul of Rome; 97 BC; With: Gnaeus Cornelius Lentulus	Succeeded by Gn. Domitius Ahenobarbus; G. Cassius Longinus
Preceded by L. Licinius Crassus; Gn. Domitius Ahenobarbus	Censor of Rome; 89 BC; With: Lucius Julius Caesar	Succeeded by L. Marcius Philippus; M. Perperna
