= Lucius Valerius Flaccus (consul 100 BC) =

Roman senator during the civil wars of the 80s BC

Lucius Valerius Flaccus (died between 73 and 69 BC) was a consul of the Roman Republic in 100 BC and princeps senatus (leader of the Roman Senate) during the civil wars of the 80s. He is noted for his peace initiatives, which failed, and for sponsoring the Lex Valeria that created the dictatorship of Sulla.

== Life and career ==
Flaccus belonged to the patrician gens Valeria, one of the most important gentes of the Republic. Flaccus' ancestors reached the consulship over five generations; his grandfather was consul in 152, his father was consul in 131 and also Flamen Martialis, the sacred priest of Mars. In addition, Flaccus had two homonymous cousins active during his lifetime: Gaius Valerius Flaccus, who became consul in 93, and Lucius Valerius Flaccus, consul in 86.

The earliest official capacity recorded for Lucius Flaccus is monetalis ("moneyer"), a common preliminary to the political career track for young men of senatorial rank. In 108 or 107 BC, Flaccus issued coinage depicting Victory and Mars. Flaccus was elected praetor sometime before 103 BC. In 100, he was the colleague of Gaius Marius for Marius' sixth consulship. He was so little at variance with Marius that his contemporary Rutilius Rufus, in his non-extant history, disparaged him as "more a servant than a colleague."

In 97, Flaccus was censor with the Marcus Antonius who was consul in 99 BC. The duties of the censors included revising the census, which not only registered citizens, but determined social rank (ordo). Although no figures have survived from this census, Italians were registered as citizens in great numbers, presumably to strengthen the political power of those likely to support the Marian faction. Flaccus and Antonius expelled Marcus Duronius from the senate because as tribune he had abrogated a sumptuary law passed by Publius Licinius Crassus. They also reappointed Marcus Aemilius Scaurus as princeps senatus. Flaccus himself was recognized as princeps perhaps as early as 92–91 BC, but certainly in the census of 86. Theodor Mommsen erroneously thought that Sulla had abolished the position and that Flaccus was the last princeps.

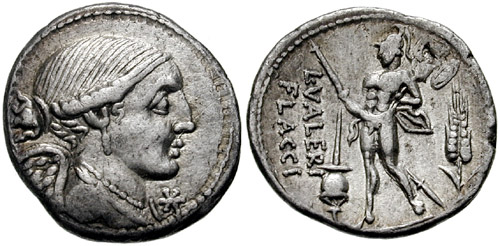
Denarius issued by L. Valerius Flaccus in 108/107 BC, depicting Victory, and Mars flanked by a flamen's cap and stalk of grain

Flaccus served as interrex in 82, presiding over the centuriate assembly for the election of Sulla as dictator, who in turn made Flaccus his magister equitum ("Master of the Horse"), and remained so until 79 BC.

=== Religious office ===
Lucius Flaccus was flamen Martialis when he died, sometime after the cooptation of Julius Caesar to the pontifical college in 73 and before that of the Publius Sulpicius Galba who was praetor around 66. The year Flaccus acquired the priesthood is undetermined. The iconography of coinage he issued as monetalis in 108 or 107 BC includes a flamen's distinctive cap. His father also had served as the high priest of Mars, and the image may refer to this heritage; since sons often succeeded fathers in religious office, it is possible that the coin also marks the beginning of his own priesthood.

== Role in civil war ==
Cicero lists Lucius Flaccus among those who preferred dealing with Cinna to destroying their country through civil strife. Neither Cinna nor Sulla could lay claim to complete constitutional legitimacy, but during the period 86 to 83 BC, no former consuls supported Sulla. As princeps senatus and the oldest living consularis, Flaccus took the lead in attempting negotiations with Sulla, anticipating his return to Italy with troops after his peace settlement with Mithridates VI of Pontus in the fall of 85 BC. By this time, Lucius's cousin (also named Lucius Valerius Flaccus), the suffect consul who had filled Marius's term in 86, had taken up his proconsular province of Asia; in early 85, he was killed in a mutiny led by the pro-Marian officer Fimbria. The murder is assumed to have influenced the feelings of the Valerii Flacci regarding the Cinnan-Marian faction.

In an address to the senate, Flaccus urged concordia ("harmonious order") and took the initiative by sending envoys to Sulla in Greece. In the meantime, Cinna and Carbo arranged to prolong their consulship for a second term in 84 by spinning Sulla's imminent return as a state of emergency, against which they also began to assemble troops. Flaccus and the "peace party" at Rome appear not to have mounted any opposition to this action. The Cinnans' fears were confirmed when Sulla made it clear to the senatorial envoys that he would not dismiss his army when he reached Italy. After the mutinous murder of Cinna, Carbo rejected peace negotiations. So did Sulla.

Flaccus was chosen in 82 BC by the senate – at the instigation of Sulla – as interrex, the official required for holding elections if for some reason the previous year's consuls were unable to do so. In this case, both consuls were dead: Carbo had by now been defeated in battle and executed by the young Pompeius Magnus. Sulla sent a letter to Flaccus and the senate in which he urged, given the chaotic state in which Rome found itself, that the appointment of a dictator would do more to restore order than the messy business of elections. Although the office of dictator had constitutional precedent, with frequent dictatores holding short-term military commands in the Early Republic, there had been no Roman dictator for 120 years, since the Hannibalic War. Sulla furthermore pressed to remove the term limit of six months from the office. As interrex, Flaccus took Sulla's hint; instead of nominating consules suffecti to fill the vacancies left by the deaths of Cinna and Carbo, he introduced a bill to the comitia appointing Sulla as dictator. The legislation was therefore known as the Lex Valeria by the gentilic name of its sponsor. At this time, Flaccus was also made magister equitum.

Flaccus is thought to have influenced his cousin Gaius Valerius Flaccus to support, or at least to accept the necessity of, Sulla's regime. Gaius was the brother of the Lucius Flaccus who was murdered in Asia in 85; he was governor of Gallia Transalpina and most likely Cisalpina in the mid-80s, and was also a recent and possibly still current governor of one or both of the Spanish provinces. He thus would have commanded the largest number of troops in the western empire outside of Italy. The concession of the Valerii Flacci was a significant factor in the establishment of the Sullan regime.

== Selected bibliography ==
- Lovano, Michael. The Age of Cinna: Crucible of Late Republican Rome. Franz Steiner Verlag, 2002. Limited preview online.
- Ryan, Francis X. Rank and Participation in the Roman Senate. Franz Steiner Verlag, 1998.

Political offices
Preceded by Gaius Marius; Manius Aquillius	Roman consul 100 BC; With: Gaius Marius	Succeeded by Marcus Antonius; Aulus Postumius Albinus
