= Marcus Antonius (orator) =

Roman senator and renowned orator

- Born: 143 BC
- Died: 87 BC (aged 55–56)
- Office: Consul (99 BC)
- Children: Marcus Antonius Creticus; Gaius Antonius Hybrida; Antonia

Marcus Antonius (143–87 BC) was a Roman politician of the Antonius family and one of the most distinguished Roman orators of his time. He was also the grandfather of the famous general and triumvir, Mark Antony.

== Career ==
His cursus honorum begins with the quaestorship in 113 BC and an incident involving the Vestals, and in 102 Antonius was elected praetor with proconsular powers for the Roman province of Cilicia. During his term, Antonius fought the pirates with such success that the Senate voted a naval triumph in his honor. He was then elected consul in 99, together with Aulus Postumius Albinus, and in 97, he was elected censor. He held a command in the Social War in 90. During the civil war between Cinna and Octavius, Antonius supported the latter. This cost him his life; Gaius Marius and Cinna executed him when they obtained possession of Rome in 87.

Throughout Antonius' political career, he continued to appear as a mediative defender or an accuser in Roman courts of law. Antonius' modern reputation for eloquence derives from the authority of Cicero, since none of his speeches survive. He is one of the chief speakers in Cicero's De Oratore.

== Family ==
Antonius had two sons, Marcus Antonius Creticus and Gaius Antonius Hybrida, and a daughter, Antonia. Marcus Antonius Creticus was the father of the triumvir Mark Antony.

In 100 Antonius obtained a triumph, because he had fought successfully against the Cilician pirates. Sometime later, his daughter Antonia was kidnapped by the pirates from his villa near Misenum and was only released after the payment of a large ransom.

== Death ==
In the biography of Gaius Marius in Plutarch's Parallel Lives, it is described that Marcus Antonius went to visit a humble plebeian who, to make his distinguished guest feel at home, sent a slave to a nearby innkeeper to get some wine. When the innkeeper asked why he was buying such an expensive wine, the slave naively told the innkeeper that Marcus Antonius was visiting his master's house. When the slave left, this innkeeper went to tell Marius.

It is said that on hearing the news during a meal that Marius applauded with joy and almost went to the house in person; however, he sent Annius with a group of men to bring back the head of Marcus Antonius. When the men reached the house, Annius waited outside while his armed men went in. When they found Antonius he began to plead for his life and the armed men found him so bewitching and charismatic that they hung their heads and wept. Finally Annius entered the room. Hurling curses at his men, he finally strode across the room and cut off the orator's head.

Political offices
| Preceded by Gaius Marius; Lucius Valerius Flaccus | Roman consul 99 BC; With: Aulus Postumius Albinus | Succeeded by Q. Caecilius Metellus Nepos; Titus Didius |
| Preceded by Quintus Caecilius Metellus Numidicus; Gaius Caecilius Metellus Caprarius | Roman censor 97–96 BC; With: Lucius Valerius Flaccus | Succeeded by Gnaeus Domitius Ahenobarbus; Lucius Licinius Crassus |
