= Atticus =

Atticus may refer to:

- Atticus, an adjective Latin name meaning "Athenian" or "of Attica"

== People ==
- Dionysius Atticus, rhetorician of the 1st century BC from Pergamon
- Vipsanius Atticus, also a rhetorician of the 1st century BC from Pergamon, who may or may not be the same person as Dionysius Atticus
- Curtius Atticus, companion of the Roman emperor Tiberius
- Atticus (philosopher) (fl. c. 175), Platonist philosopher and author of lost Platonic commentary
- Atticus, Christian martyr, one of Agapius, Atticus, Carterius, Styriacus, Tobias, Eudoxius, Nictopolion, and Companions (d. 310)
- Atticus of Constantinople (406–425)
- Herodes Atticus (101–177), Greek rhetorician
- Titus Pomponius Atticus (112/109 – 35/32 BC), ancient Roman littérateur, philosopher, and correspondent with Cicero
- Atticus Browne (born 1991), West Indian cricketer
- Atticus Greene Haygood (1839–1896), Methodist bishop and president of Emory University
- Atticus Mitchell (born 1993), Canadian actor and musician
- Atticus Ross (born 1968), English musician
- Atticus Shaffer (born 1998), American actor
- Atticus (poet), pseudonymous Canadian poet

== Fictional people ==
- Atticus, a character in Cicero's De Legibus
- Atticus, a character in The 39 Clues series of young adult novels
- Atticus Aldridge, a character in the television series Downton Abbey
- Atticus Busby, a character in the Australian television series Little Lunch
- Atticus Fetch, a character in the television series Californication
- Atticus Finch, a central character in the novel To Kill a Mockingbird
- Atticus Freeman, a character in the television series Lovecraft Country
- Atticus King, a character in the comic series King of Spies by Mark Millar
- Atticus Kodiak, a character in novels by Greg Rucka
- Atticus Lincoln, a character in the television series Grey's Anatomy
- Sir Atticus Moon, a character in Big Time Movie
- Atticus Murphy Jr., a character in the television series Todd and the Book of Pure Evil
- Admiral Atticus Noble, a sadistic military leader and character of the Netflix space opera Rebel Moon
- Atticus O'Sullivan, the main character of the novel series The Iron Druid Chronicles
- Atticus Pünd, the detective in Anthony Horowitz's Magpie Murders
- Atticus Rhodes, a character in the English dub of the Japanese anime Yu-Gi-Oh! GX
- Atticus Turner, a character in the novel Lovecraft Country

== Other ==
- Atticus (band), an alternative rock band from Knoxville, Tennessee
- Atticus (novel), a 1996 novel by Ron Hansen
- Atticus Circle, non-profit organization advocating for LGBT issues in Texas
- Atticus Clothing, clothing line developed by musicians
- Atticus the Storyteller's 100 Greek Myths, collection of Greek mythology by Lucy Coats
- Atticus, part of the tympanic cavity of the middle ear
- Atticus (given name)
