= Karl Wilhelm Piderit =

Karl Wilhelm Piderit (20 March 1815, in Witzenhausen – 27 May 1875, in Hanau) was a German classical philologist and educator.

From 1833 he studied at the University of Marburg, receiving his doctorate with a dissertation on the rhetorician Hermagoras of Temnos, titled Commentatio De Hermagora rhetora. In 1837 he became an apprentice-teacher at the gymnasium in Hersfeld, and two years later began teaching classes at a grammar school in Marburg. In 1844 he returned to Hersfeld as a teacher, and from 1850 performed similar duties at the gymnasium in Kassel. In 1853 he was appointed director of the Hanau gymnasium, a position he maintained up until his death in 1875.

== Published works ==
He is best remembered for his scholarly editions of Cicero, of which, he published:

- De oratore (1862; 6th edition, 3 volumes 1886–90).
- Partitiones oratoriae (2nd edition, 1867).
- Brutus (3rd edition, 1889).

Piderit was also the author of:

- De Apollodoro Pergameno et Theodoro Gadarensi rhetoribus, 1842 – On Apollodorus of Pergamon and Theodorus of Gadara.
- Sophokleische Studien (2 parts, 1856–57) – Sophocles studies

Following the death of theologian August Friedrich Christian Vilmar in 1868, Piderit released several editions of his works:

- Ein Weihnachtsspiel aus einer Handschrift des 15. Jahrhunderts, 1869 (edition of Vilmar) – A Christmas play from a manuscript of the 15th century.
- Lebensbilder deutscher Dichter, 1869 (edition of Vilmar) – Biography of a German poet.
- Luther, Melanchthon, Zwingli: nebst einem Anhang: Das evangelische Kirchenlied, 1869 (edition of Vilmar) – Martin Luther, Philip Melanchthon, Huldrych Zwingli: with an appendix: An evangelical hymn.
- Die Augsburgische Confession, 1870 (edition of Vilmar) – The Augsburg Confession.
- Die Lehre vom geistlichen Amt, 1870 (edition of Vilmar) – The doctrine of the ministry.
- Die genieperiode. Ein vortrag von A.F.C. Vilmar. Supplement zu des verfassers Literaturgeschichte, 1872 – The genius period: a lecture of August Friedrich Christian Vilmar: Supplement to the author's literary history.
- Lehrbuch der Pastoraltheologie, 1872 (edition of Vilar) – Textbook of pastoral theology.
