= Caecilius of Calacte =

Greek critic and rhetorician during the reign of Augustus

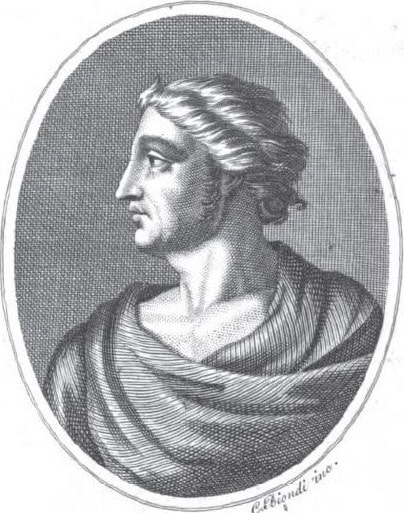
Caecilius of Calacte

Caecilius of Calacte (Ancient Greek: Κεκίλιος) was a rhetorician and literary critic active in Rome during the reign of Augustus. Caecilius was an early proponent of the rhetorical school of Atticism. As well as his works on rhetoric and literary criticism, he apparently wrote historical treatises, including a history of the Servile Wars in his native Sicily.

== Life ==
The main source of information about Caecilius' life is the Suda, which says that he was from Sicily, originally called Archagathus (Αρχάγαθος), possibly of slave origins, and Jewish. He was born about 50 BC in Calacte on the north coast of Sicily, and was probably a student of Apollodorus of Pergamon. Both the Suda and Hermagoras say that he taught in Rome during the reign of Augustus. The Suda reports that he lived until the reign of Hadrian, more than a century after the death of Augustus; this is possibly due to confusion with the quaestor Quintus Caecilius Niger. A mention of Caecilius by Dionysius of Halicarnassus, who describes him as a friend in his Epistle to Pompey, may have been written as early as 30 BC and suggests that he may already have been an established critic by then.

== Works ==
He apparently wrote works of both history and literary criticism, but only a few fragments of his writings are extant. Athenaeus, the main source of information about Caecilius' historical works, reports that he wrote a history of the Servile Wars (slave revolts) in Sicily, and refers to a work in which Caecilius mentioned the Sicilian tyrant Agathocles. He also apparently wrote about the literary merits of historians, praising Thucydides but criticising Timaeus and Theopompus.

In his literary criticism, Caecilius was one of the first proponents of Atticism, alongside his friend Dionysius of Halicarnassus. He wrote a treatise Against the Phrygians which apparently criticised the Asiatic style of rhetoric, producing a glossary of Attic phrases, and a treatise on the difference between the Attic and Asiatic styles of rhetoric. He wrote an Art of Rhetoric and a work on rhetorical figures, which is quoted by Quintilian. He also wrote a treatise on the Ten Attic Orators, and may have been the one who created the canon of ten orators. As well as his treatise on the ten orators, he wrote individual works on the speeches of Demosthenes, Antiphon, and Lysias, and treatises comparing Demosthenes with both Cicero and Aeschines.

Longinus' treatise On the Sublime was written in response to a work by Caecilius on the same topic.

== Works cited ==
- O'Sullivan, Neil (2005). "Caecilius, 'Canons', and the Origins of Atticism". In Dominik, William J. (ed.). Roman Eloquence: Rhetoric in Art and Society. London: Routledge. ISBN 0-203-43275-4.
- Roberts, W. Rhys (1897). "Caecilius of Calacte". American Journal of Philology. 18 (3): 302–312. doi:10.2307/287826. JSTOR 287826.
- Roberts, W. Rhys (1900). "The Literary Circle of Dionysius of Halicarnassus". The Classical Review. 14 (9): 439–442. doi:10.1017/S0009840X0008197X. S2CID 162999601.
- Viidebaum, Laura (2021). Creating the Ancient Rhetorical Tradition. Cambridge University Press. doi:10.1017/9781108873956. ISBN 9781108873956.
- Weißenberger, Michael (2006). "Caecilius [III 5]". Brill's New Pauly. doi:10.1163/1574-9347_bnp_e222580.
- Woerther, Frédérique (2015). Caecilius de Calè-Actè: Fragments et Témoignages. Paris: Les Belles Lettres. ISBN 978-2-251-00602-4.
