= Metrodorus of Scepsis =

Ancient Greek philosopher, historian, and rhetorician

Metrodorus of Scepsis (Greek: Μητρόδωρος ὁ Σκήψιος) (c. 145 BCE – 70 BCE), from the town of Scepsis in ancient Mysia, was a friend of Mithridates VI of Pontus and celebrated in antiquity for the excellence of his memory. He may be the same Metrodorus who, according to the Elder Pliny, in consequence of his hostility to the Romans, was surnamed the "Rome-hater" ("Misoromæus"). Information on Metrodorus is very scarce.

== Life ==
The fullest ancient account of the life of Metrodorus is to be found in Strabo:

From Scepsis came also Demetrius, whom I often mention, the grammarian who wrote a commentary on The Marshalling of the Trojan Forces, and was born at about the same time as Crates and Aristarchus; and later, Metrodorus, a man who changed from his pursuit of philosophy to political life, and taught rhetoric, for the most part, in his written works; and he used a brand-new style and dazzled many. On account of his reputation he succeeded, though a poor man, in marrying brilliantly in Chalcedon; and he passed for a Chalcedonian. And having paid court to Mithridates Eupator, he with his wife sailed away with him to Pontus; and he was treated with exceptional honor, being appointed to the judgeship from which there was no appeal to the king. However, his good fortune did not continue, but he incurred the enmity of men less just than himself and revolted from the king when he was on the embassy to Tigranes the Armenian. And Tigranes sent him back against his will to Eupator, who was already in flight from his ancestral realm; but Metrodorus died on the way, whether by order of the king or from disease; for both accounts are given of his death. So much for the Scepsians.

For a time Mithridates had avoided capture by the Romans by staying within the territory of Tigranes, with an ambiguous status somewhere between that of a guest and prisoner. Metrodorus was apparently with Tigranes at this time. Plutarch offers one relevant account of these circumstances in The Life of Lucullus:

Up to this time Tigranes had not deigned to see Mithridates, nor speak to him, though the man was allied to him by marriage, and had been expelled from such a great kingdom. Instead, he had kept him at the farthest remove possible, in disgrace and contumely, and had suffered him to be held a sort of prisoner in marshy and sickly regions. Now, however, he summoned him to his palace with marks of esteem and friendship. There, in secret conference, they strove to allay their mutual suspicions at the expense of their friends, by laying the blame upon them. One of these was Metrodorus of Scepsis, a man of agreeable speech and wide learning, who enjoyed the friendship of Mithridates in such a high degree that he was called the king's father. This man, as it seems, had once been sent as an ambassador from Mithridates to Tigranes, with a request for aid against the Romans. On this occasion Tigranes asked him: "But what is your own advice to me, Metrodorus, in this matter?" Whereupon Metrodorus, either with an eye to the interests of Tigranes, or because he did not wish Mithridates to be saved, said that as an ambassador he urged consent, but as an adviser he forbade it. Tigranes disclosed this to Mithridates, not supposing, when he told him, that he would punish Metrodorus past all healing. But Metrodorus was at once put out of the way. Then Tigranes repented of what he had done, although he was not entirely to blame for the death of Metrodorus. He merely gave an impulse, as it were, to the hatred which Mithridates already had for the man. For he had long been secretly hostile to him, as was seen from his private papers when they were captured, in which there were directions that Metrodorus, as well as others, be put to death. Accordingly, Tigranes gave the body of Metrodorus a splendid burial, sparing no expense upon the man when dead, although he had betrayed him when alive.

Ovid also mentions (possibly the same) Metrodorus briefly:

Scepsian Metrodorus attacked Italian ways, not the land, in bitter writing: and Rome itself was accused of guilt: yet Rome accepted the lying invective equably, and the author’s wild speech did him no harm.

Metrodorus is frequently mentioned alongside one Charmadas, a member of the Academy, who taught for a time at the Athenian Ptolemaeum, and a pupil of Carneades. They are together mentioned in five different passages as both being notable for their powers of memory. A few other valuable details are available in Cicero's De oratore (3.75):

Although I was thirsting for them, I barely tasted the arts I am speaking of when I was a quaestor in Asia, where I obtained a near contemporary of mine, a rhetor from the Academy – the Metrodorus whose memory Antoninus was recalling...

According to Charles Francis Brittain, this would allow us to guess a rough birth date for Metrodorus around 145 BCE and clearly indicates an affiliation with the Academy. It also demonstrates that Metrodorus was a rhetorician. Brittain goes on to speculate that Metrodorus most likely studied at the Academy some time during the period roughly 130–110 BCE, before his return to Asia. Brittain notes, "This does not prove that Charmadas taught Metrodorus, of course, but someone did, at a time when Charmadas, who was clearly interested in rhetoric, was in Athens." Brittain also suggests, "This makes Metrodorus the earliest (certain) Academic rhetorician..."

== Powers of memory ==
Metrodorus is frequently mentioned by Classical authors such as Cicero, Quintilian, and Pliny the Elder as one famous for the power of his memory. He was thought to have been a key figure in the development of the art of memory, a loosely associated group of mnemonic principles and techniques which are used to organize memory impressions, improve recall, and assist in the combination and 'invention' of ideas.

The memory of Metrodorus is mentioned in Cicero's De oratore (Book 2, 88) where Crassus states, "I have seen the greatest men, men endowed with an almost divine memory; at Athens Carneades; and Metrodorus of Scepsis in Asia, whom I hear is still living; and both these said, that they used ideas upon those places, which they wanted to retain in their memories, in the same manner as one does characters upon wax."

The Elder Pliny's reference to Metrodorus' powers of memory explicitly states that he perfected the art of memory which was itself thought to have been created by Simonides of Ceos.

Mithridates, who was king of twenty-two nations, administered their laws in as many languages, and could harangue each of them, without employing an interpreter. There was in Greece a man named Charmidas, who, when a person asked him for any book in a library, could repeat it by heart, just as though he were reading. Memory, in fine, has been made an art; which was first invented by the lyric poet, Simonides, and perfected by Metrodorus of Scepsis, so as to enable persons to repeat word for word exactly what they have heard.

From Quintilian we learn that the techniques employed in the art of memory, as developed by Metrodorus, included the use of a memorized scheme based upon 360 places in twelve zodiacal signs:

Images are as words by which we note the things we have to learn, so that as Cicero says, 'we use places as wax and images as letters'. ... which makes me wonder all the more how Metrodorus can have found three hundred and sixty places in the twelve signs through which the sun moves. It was doubtless the vanity and boastfulness of a man glorying in a memory stronger by art than by nature.

Frances A. Yates, in her work on the art of memory, examines the information available on Metrodorus' memory techniques at some length. She cites the following passage from an older article on ancient memory systems:

I suspect that Metrodorus was versed in astrology, for astrologers divided the zodiac not only into 12 signs, but also into 36 decans, each covering ten degrees; for each decan there was an associated decan-figure. Metrodorus probably grouped ten artificial backgrounds (loci) under each decan figure. He would thus have a series of loci numbered 1 to 360, which he could use in his operations. With a little calculation he could find any background (locus) by its number, and he was insured against missing a background, since all were arranged in numerical order. His system was therefore well designed for the performance of striking feats of memory.

== Other references ==
A number of fragments attributed to a man by this name are to be found in classical works. The following fragments most likely refer to the Metrodorus of Scepsis who was in the service of Mithridates Eupator and who was famous for his memory, however, the possibility exists that there was more than one man identified by this name.

The Amazons, also, are said to live in the mountains above Albania. Now Theophanes, who made the expedition with Pompey and was in the country of the Albanians, says that the Gelae and the Legae, Scythian people, live between the Amazons and the Albanians, and that the Mermadalis River flows there, midway between these people and the Amazons. But others, among whom are Metrodorus of Scepsis and Hypsicrates, who themselves, likewise, were not unacquainted with the region in question, say that the Amazons live on the borders of the Gargarians, in the northerly foothills of those parts of the Caucasian Mountains which are called Ceraunian; that the Amazons spend the rest of their time off to themselves, performing their several individual tasks, such as ploughing, planting, pasturing cattle, and particularly in training horses, though the bravest engage mostly in hunting on horseback and practise warlike exercises; that the right breasts of all are seared when they are infants, so that they can easily use their right arm for every needed purpose, and especially that of throwing the javelin; that they also use bow and sagaris and light shield, and make the skins of wild animals serve as helmets, clothing, and girdles; but that they have two special months in the spring in which they go up into the neighboring mountain which separates them and the Gargarians. The Gargarians also, in accordance with an ancient custom, go up thither to offer sacrifice with the Amazons and also to have intercourse with them for the sake of begetting children, doing this in secrecy and darkness, any Gargarian at random with any Amazon; and after making them pregnant they send them away; and the females that are born are retained by the Amazons themselves, but the males are taken to the Gargarians to be brought up; and each Gargarian to whom a child is brought adopts the child as his own, regarding the child as his son because of his uncertainty.

What Metrodorus the Scepsian relates, in his book 'On Custom,' is like fable, and is to be disregarded.

There are also Etruscan statues dispersed in various parts of the world, which beyond a doubt were originally made in Etruria. I should have supposed that these had been the statues only of divinities, had not Metrodorus of Scepsis, who had his surname from his hatred to the Roman name, reproached us with having pillaged the city of Volsinii for the sake of the two thousand statues which it contained.

Megasthenes informs us, that in India, serpents grow to such an immense size, as to swallow stags and bulls; while Metrodorus says, that about the river Rhyndacus, in Pontus, they seize and swallow the birds that are flying above them, however high and however rapid their flight.

At any other time, also, if a woman strips herself naked while she is menstruating, and walks round a field of wheat, the caterpillars, worms, beetles, and other vermin, will fall from off the ears of corn. Metrodorus of Scepsis tells us that this discovery was first made in Cappadocia; and that, in consequence of such multitudes of cantharides being found to breed there, it is the practice for women to walk through the middle of the fields with their garments tucked up above the thighs.

Adamas, too, overcomes and neutralizes poisons, dispels delirium, and banishes groundless perturbations of the mind; hence it is that some have given it the name of 'ananchites.' Metrodorus of Scepsis is the only author, that I know of, who says that this stone is found also in Germany, and in the island of Basilia, where amber is found. He says, too, that this is preferable to the stone of Arabia; but can there be any doubt that his statement is incorrect?

With the waters of these streams the Padus unites, and with them discharges itself into the sea, forming, according to most writers, between the Alps and the sea-shore a triangular figure, 2000 stadia in circumference, not unlike the Delta formed by the Nile in Egypt. I feel somewhat ashamed to have to borrow from the Greeks any statement in reference to Italy; Metrodorus of Scepsis, however, informs us that this river has obtained its name of Padus from the fact, that about its source there are great numbers of pine-trees, which in the Gallic language are called "padi."
