= Augustus Samuel Wilkins =

English classical scholar (1843–1905)

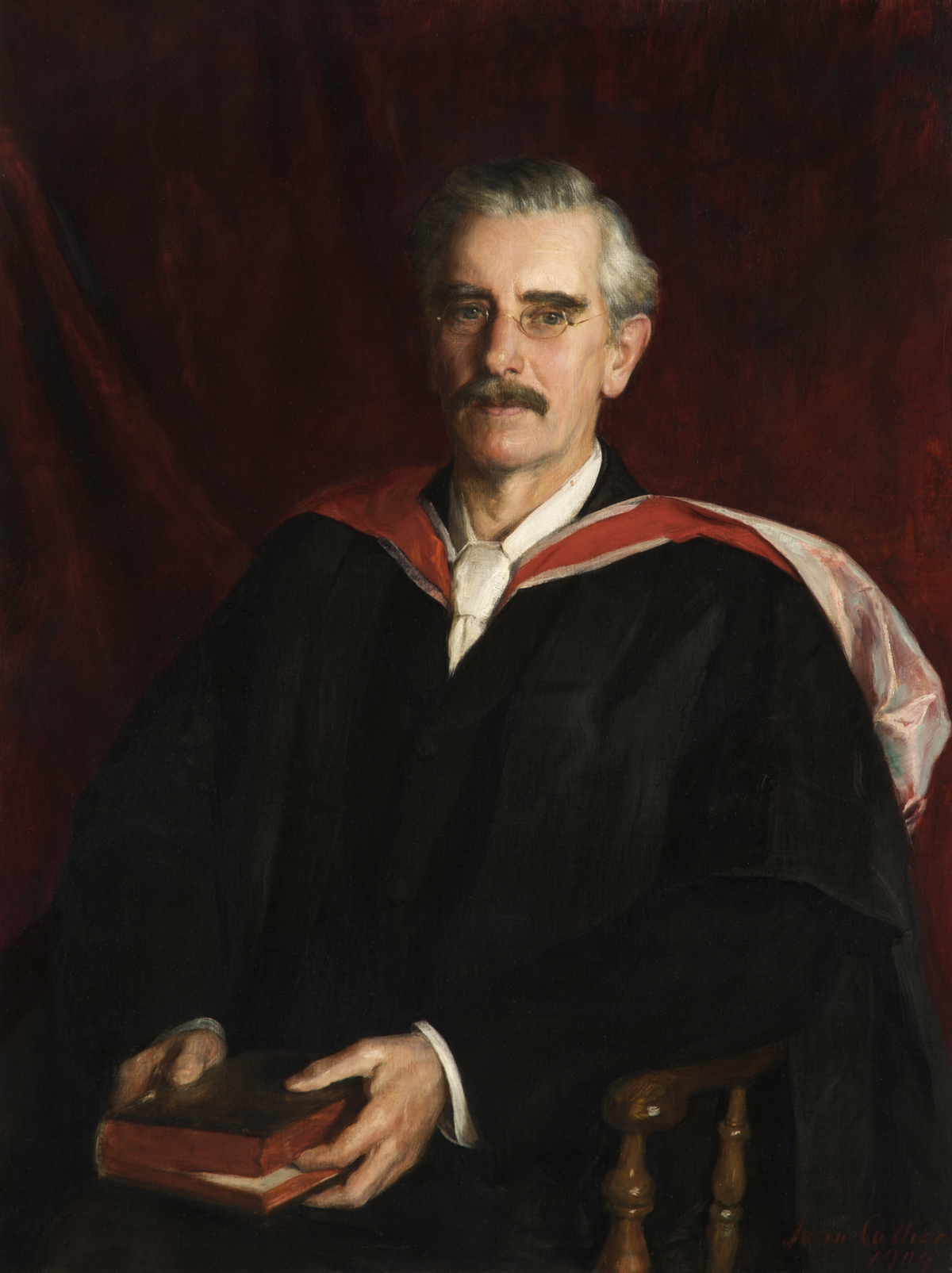
Wilkins

Augustus Samuel Wilkins (1843–1905) was an English classical scholar. He held a professorship of Latin in Manchester for 34 years.

== Life ==
He was born in Enfield Road, Kingsland, London, on 20 August 1843 into a Congregationalist family, the son of Samuel J. Wilkins, a schoolmaster in Brixton, and his wife, Mary Haslam, of Thaxted, Essex. Educated at Bishop Stortford collegiate school, he then attended the lectures of Henry Malden, professor of Greek and Francis William Newman, professor of Latin, at University College, London. Entering St John's College, Cambridge with an open exhibition in October 1864, he became a foundation scholar in 1866. He was President of the Cambridge Union for Lent term, 1868.

In 1868 Wilkins graduated B.A. as fifth in the first class of the classical tripos. A nonconformist, Wilkins was at that point legally disqualified from a college fellowship; that changed after the Universities Tests Act 1871, but by then Wilkins was married, still an impediment. The same year he took the M.A. degree in the University of London, receiving the gold medal for classics, and was appointed Latin lecturer at Owens College, Manchester; in 1869 he was promoted to the Latin professorship there. He was elected to the membership of Manchester Literary and Philosophical Society on 29 December 1868.

At Manchester Wilkins promoted female education, and lobbied for a department of theology. He was a popular lecturer on literary subjects in Manchester and other towns of Lancashire, and chaired the Lancashire Independent College and the council of the Manchester High School for Girls. In 1903, after 34 years' tenure of the Latin professorship, a weak heart compelled him to resign, whereupon he became professor of classical literature.

On 26 July 1905, Wilkins died at Rhos-on-Sea in North Wales, and was buried in the cemetery of Colwyn Bay.

== Works ==
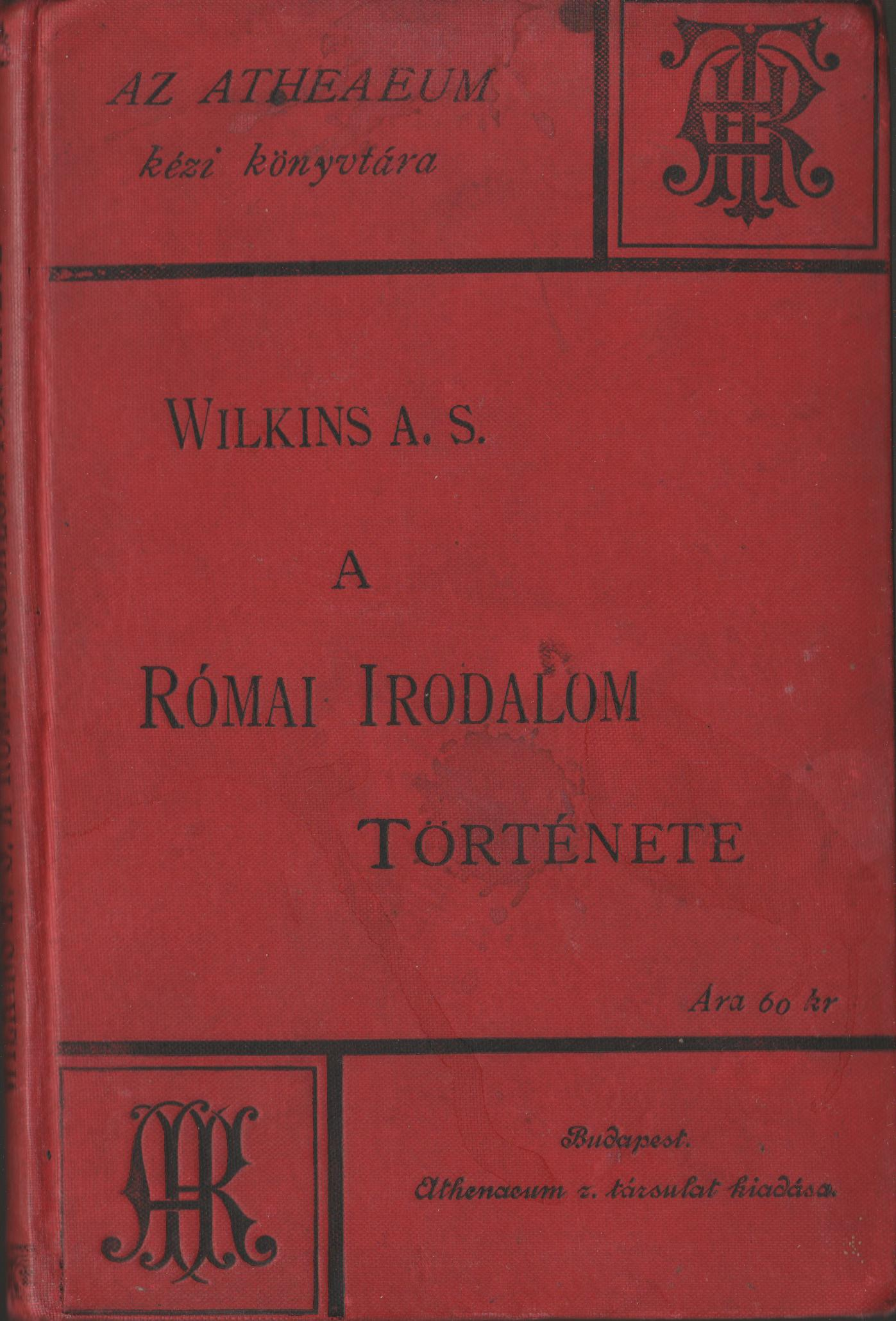
History of the Roman literature (Hungarian edition, 1895)

As a student, Wilkins won a number of prizes, and his university prize essays were published:

- Christian and Pagan Ethics, Hulsean Prize for 1868, appearing in 1869 as The Light of the World, and reaching a second edition, was dedicated to James Baldwin Brown the younger
- Phœnicia and Israel, (1871), Burney Prize for 1870, was dedicated to James Fraser.
- National Education in Greece (1873), Hare Prize for 1873, was dedicated to Connop Thirlwall.

Wilkins's major work was his full edition of Cicero De Oratore, lib. i.–iii. (Oxford, 1879–1892). A critical edition of the text of the whole of Cicero's rhetorical works followed in 1903. As an editor he came into line with contemporary German scholarship:

- In 1868 he translated Karl Wilhelm Piderit's German notes on Cicero De Oratore, lib. i.
- With Edwin Bourdieu England, he translated Georg Curtius's Principles of Greek Etymology and Greek Verb.

Wilkins also issued commentaries on Cicero's Speeches against Catiline (1871), and the speech De Imperio Gnæi Pompeii (1879), and on Horace's Epistles (1885).

To John Percival Postgate's Corpus Poëtarum Latinorum, Wilkins contributed a critical text of the Thebais and Achilleis of Statius (1904); and he produced primers on Roman Antiquities (1877) and Roman Literature (1890), the first of which was translated into French, as well as a book on Roman education (Cambridge, 1905). In the Encyclopædia Britannica, ninth edition, he wrote on the Greek and Latin languages; in William Smith's Dictionary of Greek and Roman Antiquities, 3rd edit., on Roman antiquities, and in Companion to Greek Studies (Cambridge, 1904) on Greek education.

With Henry John Roby, Wilkins prepared an Elementary Latin Grammar in 1893.

== Awards and honours ==
Wilkins dedicated his edition of the De Oratore to the University of St Andrews, which conferred on him an honorary degree in 1882. He received the same distinction at Trinity College, Dublin in 1892, and took the degree of Litt.D. at the University of Cambridge in 1885.

== Family ==
In 1870, Wilkins married Charlotte Elizabeth Field, the second daughter of William Field of Bishop Stortford; she survived him with a daughter and three sons.
