= Atticus (given name) =

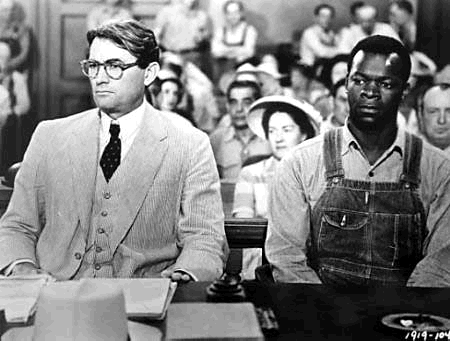
- Gregory Peck as Atticus Finch and Brock Peters as defendant Tom Robinson in a scene from To Kill a Mockingbird.
- Gender: Masculine

Origin
- Origin: Greek
- Meaning: "From Attica"

Atticus is a masculine name of Greek origin meaning "from Attica." The name is often used in reference to Atticus Finch, a heroic lawyer who represents an African American man accused of rape by a white woman in a racist Southern United States town in Harper Lee’s 1960 novel To Kill a Mockingbird. Usage of the name continued to increase even after the publication of the 2015 sequel Go Set a Watchman, a novel which presents a more conflicted version of Atticus Finch who also holds racist beliefs. The name has been steadily increasing in usage in the United States. It has been among the top 1,000 names for boys in the United States since 2004 and among the top 300 since 2020.

== People ==
- Titus Pomponius Atticus (112/109 – 35/32 BC), ancient Roman littérateur, philosopher, and correspondent with Cicero
- Herodes Atticus (101–177), Greek rhetorician
- Atticus (philosopher) (fl. c. 175), Platonist philosopher and author of lost Plato commentary
- Atticus, Christian martyr, one of Agapius, Atticus, Carterius, Styriacus, Tobias, Eudoxius, Nictopolion, and Companions (died 310)
- Atticus of Constantinople (406–425)
- Atticus Greene Haygood (1839–1896), Methodist bishop and president of Emory University
- Atticus Ross (born 1968), English musician
- Atticus Browne (born 1991), West Indian cricketer
- Atticus Mitchell (born 1993), Canadian actor and musician
- Atticus Shaffer (born 1998), American actor

== Fictional people ==
- Atticus, a character in Cicero's De Legibus
- Atticus, a character in The 39 Clues series of young adult novels
- Atticus Aldridge, a character in the television series Downton Abbey
- Atticus Fetch, a character in the television series Californication
- Atticus Finch, a central character in the novel To Kill a Mockingbird
- Atticus Kodiak, a character in novels by Greg Rucka
- Sir Atticus Moon, a character in Big Time Movie
- Atticus Murphy Jr., a character in the television series Todd and the Book of Pure Evil
- Atticus O'Sullivan, the main character of the novel series The Iron Druid Chronicles
- Atticus Rhodes, a character in the English dub of the Japanese anime Yu-Gi-Oh! GX
- Atticus Lincoln, a character in the television series Grey's Anatomy
- Atticus Turner, a character in the novel Lovecraft Country
- Atticus Freeman, a character in the television series Lovecraft Country
- Atticus Busby, a character in the Australian television series Little Lunch
- Atticus Aemilius, a character in the streaming series The Chosen
- Atticus Pünd, a character in the UK mystery series Magpie Murders
