= Vipsanius Atticus =

1st-century BCE Greco-Roman philosopher

Vipsanius Atticus (possibly Marcus Vipsanius Atticus), of Pergamon, was a rhetorician of the Greco-Roman world in the 1st century CE, who may or may not have been a real figure.

Seneca the Elder writes of him, describing him as a disciple of Apollodorus of Pergamon. As he is mentioned only in this one passage of Seneca, his name has given rise to considerable dispute over the centuries.

The classical scholars Georg Ludwig Spalding and Meyer Reinhold conjectured that he was the son of Marcus Vipsanius Agrippa and Attica, and that he had the surname of Atticus in honor of his grandfather, Titus Pomponius Atticus. Peter Schreiner Frandsen, on the other hand, supposes him to have been identical with the father of Agrippa, Lucius Vipsanius. Many scholars consider both of these conjectures improbable. Scholars Jonathan August Weichert, Lennart Håkanson, and William Smith believed that, considering the imperfect state of Seneca's text, one ought to read Dionysius Atticus in this passage instead of Vipsanius Atticus. Similarly, scholar Sidney George Owen conjectured that Agrippa conferred Roman citizenship on Dionysius Atticus, and Vipsanius Atticus is the name he took.

Even today, the question is not settled, and some modern scholars, such as Charles Guérin and Frédérique Woerther, do support the idea that Vipsanius Atticus was, or at least could have been, a distinct person.

== See also ==
- Vipsania gens
- Category:Children of Marcus Vipsanius Agrippa
