= August Friedrich Christian Vilmar =

German theologian

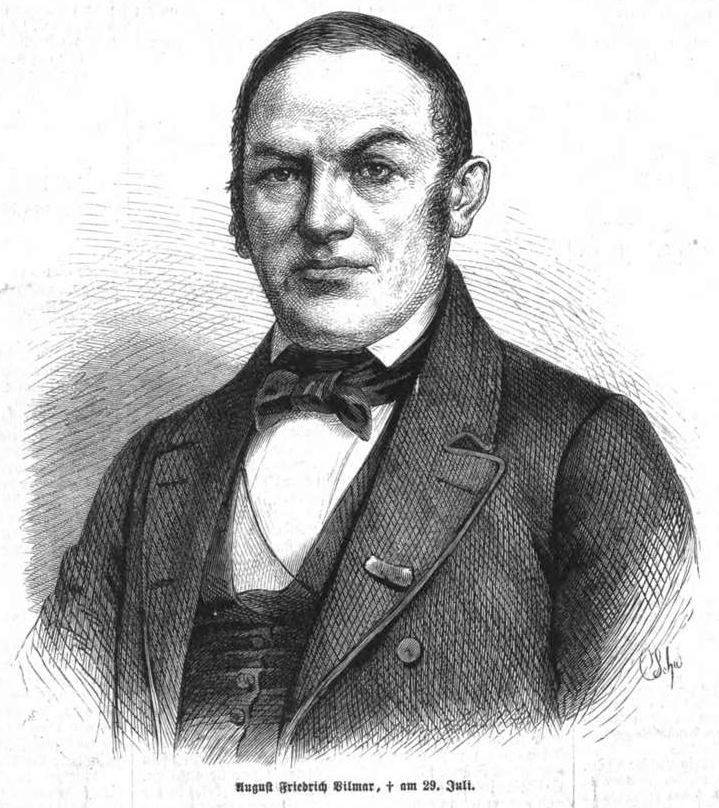
August F. Ch. Vilmar, 1868

August Friedrich Christian Vilmar, German Neo-Lutheran theologian; born at Solz (near Rotenburg, 78 m. NE of Frankfurt) November 21, 1800; died at Marburg July 30, 1868.

== Early career ==
In 1818-20 he studied theology at Marburg, only to learn doubt from rationalism, and from doubt to pass to unbelief. In December, 1823, he was appointed rector of the municipal school at Rotenburg, where he remained until 1827, when he went to Hersfeld as fourth teacher and collaborator at the gymnasium, being promoted third teacher in 1829. During these years he renounced rationalism, and for a year or two professed the opinion that the world is the feeling of God. He made further progress through reading first the Church Fathers, especially Tertullian and Irenaeus, and then Tholuck's Lehre von der Sünde, and arrived at unwavering faith in Christ by his fortieth year, realizing that all he sought was to be found in the Lutheran Church, a process begun by the careful study of the Augsburg Confession and its Apology.

== Theological views ==
On the conscience: Vilmar said that "...the heart is the central midpoint of human being and living, and also the seat of self-consciousness".

== In government ==
In 1831 Vilmar was elected from Hersfeld to the newly created diet of the electorate of Hesse, and in December of the same year he was, appointed a member of the ministerial committees for religion and instruction. From Oct., 1832, to the end of Apr., 1833, he was assistant reporter in the ministry of the interior and nominal second teacher at the gymnasium of Hanau. He was director of the gymnasium at Marburg, 1833–50, being a member of the committee on gymnasia) affairs 1836-50; in 1850 he was transferred to the ministry of the interior as consistorial councillor, and from 1851 to 1855 also discharged the duties of the aged superintendent Ernst; in 1855 he became professor of theology at the University of Marburg.

In the reports drawn up by Vilmar in the name of his committees for the Hessian Diet in 1831-32 he appealed effectually for the elevation of the national university, for the foundation of new professorships, and for the better equipment of institutions of learning. He also transformed the condition of the public schools, and may truly be termed the reformer of the gymnasia of Hesse. His views on gymnasia instruction are set forth in his twenty-four Schulreden über Fragen der Zeit (Marburg, 1846).

During this period he published works dealing with Germanic linguistics, among them being:

- Deutsche Altertümer in Heliand (1845).
- Vorlesungen über die Geschichte der deutschen National-Literatur (1845).
- Geschichte der deutschen National-Literatur (Marburg, 1846).
- Handbüchlein für Freunde des deutschen Volksliedes (1866).
- Ueber Goethes Tasso (Frankfort, 1869).
- Lebensbilder deutscher Dichter (edited by Karl Wilhelm Piderit, Marburg, 1869).
- Luther, Melanchthon, Zwingli (Frankfort, 1869).

He also worked on the reformation of religious instruction in the gymnasia. Deeming that the gymnasium was designed to train up Christian leaders of the nation, and that religious instruction should assume a distinctively churchly character, Vilmar set forth his views in a series of contributions to Hengstenberg's Evangelische Kirchenzeitung in 1841 (ed. J. Haussleiter, under the title Ueber den evangelischen Religionsunterricht in den Gymnasien, Marburg, 1888). He also prepared for use in the gymnasia a Kleines evangelisches Gesangbuch (Marburg, 1838); taking part also in the struggle on behalf of the old hymnals, as well as in the preparation of the Deutsches evangelisches Kirchengesangbuch (Stuttgart, 1855).

The Church, Vilmar believed, was about to enter upon a new era, when there would be full recognition of the absolute unity of the visible and the invisible church, and of the communion of saints with one body on earth, foreshadowing the church of the Apocalypse, the New Jerusalem. With such a conviction, Vilmar found before him two tasks: The first of these concerned the creed of the church of Hesse, Vilmar maintaining that its future depended on its absolute fidelity to the confessions of the Church from the Apostles' Creed to the unaltered Augsburg Confession.

To prove that the creed of the so-called Reformed church of Lower Hesse was this unaltered Augsburg Confession cost Vilmar immense toil. The second task was Vilmar's decided advocacy of the freedom of the Church from the State. In 1839 Vilmar took part in the Hessian confessional controversy, in which the attempt was made to discard the Augsburg Confession. Against such an endeavor Vilmar wrote his Verhältnis der evangelischen Kirche in Kurhessen zu ihren neuesten Gegnern (Marburg, 1839).

In like spirit, after the faculty of Marburg had required the use of the Heidelberg Catechism in the schools and had designated the doctrines set forth in the Hessian Catechism as "Reformed" (1855), Vilmar sought to prove, especially in his Geschichte des Konfessionsstandes der evangelischen Kirche in Hessen (Marburg, 1860), that the church of Lower Hesse was termed "Reformed" not because of the doctrines prevailing in it, but because of the form of worship introduced by the Landgrave Maurice in the Verbesserungspunkte in 1605, although after the middle of the seventeenth century the theology of Hesse-Kassel (or Hesse-Cassel) had adopted the strict predestination of the Reformed. In Die Gegenwart und die Zukunft der niederhessischen Kirche (1867), he urged that the struggle against impending union be begun with the strongest emphasis on Lutheranism; and the failure to follow this counsel of Vilmar proved a fatal error in the conflict between the Hessian churches.

In 1848-50 Vilmar exercised a profound influence on political affairs. Essentially a conservative and devoted to his sovereign, he not only supported his elector manfully, but also made the Hessischer Volksfreund, which he founded in 1848 and edited alone until the middle of 1851, a center for all the loyalists of the land. A number of his contributions to this periodical were reprinted by Vilmar himself under the title Zur neuesten Kulturgeschichte Deutschlands (3 parts, Frankfort, 1858-6?). Vilmar has rightly been characterized as preeminently acquainted with his native land and as a fervent admirer and protector of the relics of her past. His researches into Hessian history are embodied in his Hessisches Historienbüchlein (1842) and Hessische Chronik (1855), and he was also the author of the admirable Idiotikon von Kurhessen (1868). But dearer to him than all else was his church, of which he was acting superintendent, as already noted, from 1851 to 1855. His power as a preacher may still be seen in his Predigten and geistliche Reden (1876), while his visitation of churches in the discharge of his duties gave rise to many official communications of importance.

== Professor of theology at Marburg ==
On the death of Superintendent Ernst, Vilmar was elected his successor. The election was subject, however, to the approval of the sovereign, and this the last prince-elector of Hesse refused. Vilmar, though elected superintendent, was now appointed professor of theology at Marburg (Oct. 27, 1855).

Unwillingly he entered upon an office which he would have welcomed a quarter of a century before. Yet he became the most influential professor in the university. His program was set forth in Die Theologie der Thatsachen wider die Theologie der Rhetorik (1856), and four times, in the spirit of practical religion there propounded, he conducted his theological pupils through a three-years´ course which covered the entire Bible. This course of lectures was edited by his pupil C. Müller under the title Collegium Biblicum (6 vols., Gütersloh, 1879–83); and most of his other lectures were also edited posthumously: K. W. Piderit preparing the Die Augsburgische Konfession (Marburg, 1870), Lehre vom geistlichen Amt (1870), Christliche Kirchenzucht (1872), Pastoraltheologie (Gütersloh, 1872), and Dogmatik (2 vols., 1874), and C. C. Israel those on Theologische Moral (2 vols., 1871). Vilmar lectured also on homiletics, hymnology, and the literary history of the theology of the Reformation period.

Besides his professorial activity, Vilmar was the soul of the conferences of the Lutheran pastors of both Hesses, which were held alternately at Marburg and Friedberg from 1857 to 1866. He further aided the aims of these conferences by editing the Pastoraltheologische Blätter (12 vols., Stuttgart, 1861–66), to which he contributed a series of articles edited by C. Müller under the title Kirche und Welt (2 vols., Gütersloh, 1872).

== Death ==
But despite the companionship of his pupils, Vilmar felt more and more isolated and alone at Marburg, nor could he overcome his grief at the events of 1866. His melancholy continually increased, and a few months after the death of his second wife, he was found dead in bed from a repeated stroke of apoplexy.
