= Athenaeus (rhetorician) =

Ancient Greek rhetorician

Athenaeus (Ancient Greek: Ἀθήναιος, fl. 1st century BCE) was a rhetorician of ancient Greece. He was a contemporary – and main opponent – of the rhetorician Hermagoras of Temnos. He was probably born around 130 BCE.

Athenaeus defined rhetoric as the "art of deceiving".
