= Georg Curtius =

German philologist (1820–1885)

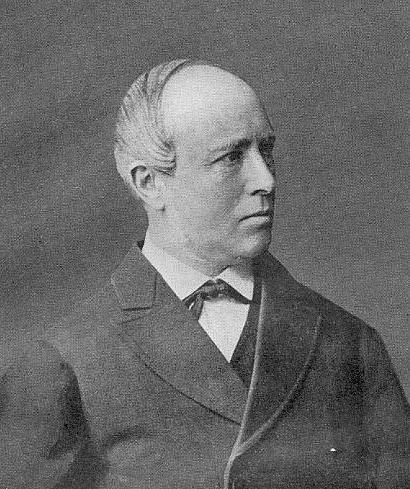
- Born: April 16, 1820; Lübeck, Kingdom of Prussia
- Died: August 12, 1885 (aged 65); Hermsdorf am Kynast, Kingdom of Prussia, German Empire

Academic background
- Education: University of Berlin
- Academic advisor: Franz Bopp

Academic work
- Discipline: Philology
- Institutions: University of Leipzig
- Doctoral students: August Leskien

Georg Curtius (April 16, 1820 – August 12, 1885) was a German philologist and distinguished comparativist.

== Biography ==
Curtius was born in Lübeck, and was the brother of the historian and archeologist Ernst Curtius. After an education at Bonn and Berlin, he was for three years schoolmaster in Dresden, until (in 1845) he returned to Berlin University as a privatdocent. In 1849 he was placed in charge of the Philological Seminary at Prague, and two years later was appointed professor of classical philology in Prague University. In 1854, he moved from Prague to a similar appointment at Kiel, and again in 1862 from Kiel to Leipzig. He was teaching lndo-European and the historical grammar of the classical languages at Leipzig. His contributions were focused "to bridge the gulf between classical philology and Aryan linguistics." As a professor he constantly attempted " to bring Classical Philology and the Science of Language into closer relation with each other." This is clearly reflected in the works of his pupils, and of his own.

His philological theories exercised a widespread influence. The more important of his publications are:

- Die Sprachvergleichung in ihrem Verhältniss zur classischen Philologie (1845; Eng. trans. by FH Trithen, 1851)
- Sprachvergleichende Beiträge zur griechischen und lateinischen Grammatik (1846)
- Grundzüge der griechischen Etymologie (1858–1862, 5th ed. 1879)
- Das Verbum der griechischen Sprache (1873).

The last two works were translated into English by Augustus Samuel Wilkins and Edwin Bourdieu England.

From 1878 until his death Curtius was general editor of the Leipziger Studien zur classischen Philologie. His Griechische Schulgrammatik, first published in 1852, passed through more than twenty editions and was edited in English. In his last work, Zur Kritik der neuesten Sprachforschung (1885), he attacked the views of the emerging Neogrammarian school of philology.

Curtius died in Hermsdorf am Kynast, aged 65, and was succeeded at Leipzig by his studentKarl Brugmann. The Opuscula of Georg Curtius were edited after his death by Ernst Windisch (Kleine Schriften von E. C., 1886–1887). He was posthumously elected to the American Philosophical Society in 1886.
