= Curtius Atticus =

Ancient Roman knight

Curtius Atticus was a wealthy eques of ancient Rome who was one of the few companions whom the Roman emperor Tiberius took with him when he retired from Rome to Capreae in 26 CE.

We know relatively little of him except that, six years later, in 32 CE, Atticus fell a victim to the machinations of Sejanus, obsessed with controlling those who had access to Tiberius, said to be operating under the "advisement" of Julius Marinus.

He was supposed by German classical scholar Justus Hermann Lipsius to be the same as the Atticus to whom two of Ovid's Epistulae ex Ponto are addressed.
