= Dionysius Atticus =

1st-century BCE Greco-Roman philosopher

Dionysius Atticus of Pergamon was a rhetorician, sophist, historian, and speechwriter of ancient Greece, who lived around the 1st century BCE, and was probably born around 80 BCE.

He was a pupil of the celebrated Apollodorus of Pergamon, tutor of the Roman emperor Augustus. Dionysius was himself a teacher of rhetoric, and the author of several works, in which he explained the theory of Apollodorus. It would appear from his surname that he resided at Athens.

He has at times been identified as the author of the anonymous work On the Sublime, but there is no scholarly consensus around the true identity of that author. He also may be the same person as the Vipsanius Atticus described by Seneca the Elder as a disciple of Apollodorus from Pergamon, but there is also no consensus around this.
