= Atticus Browne =

Vincentian cricketer (born 1991)

Personal information
- Full name: Atticus Jeremy Browne
- Born: 12 December 1991 (age 34); Saint Vincent
- Batting: Left-handed
- Bowling: Right-arm off spin

Domestic team information
- Years: Team
- 2011–2012: Windward Islands
- Source: CricketArchive, 28 December 2015

Atticus Jeremy Browne (born 12 December 1991) is a Vincentian cricketer who has played for the Windward Islands in West Indian domestic cricket. He is a left-handed opening batsman.

Browne made his first-class debut for the Windwards in March 2011, in a match against Barbados during the 2010–11 Regional Four Day Competition. He opened the batting with Tyrone Theophile in both innings, scoring 12 runs in the first and 29 in the second. Browne was selected for two more matches during the 2010–11 season, one against the England Lions and one against the Leeward Islands, but had little success in either. He returned to the Windwards team for another three matches during the 2011–12 Regional Four Day Competition, but again had little success.
