= Hermagoras of Temnos =

Ancient Greek rhetorician

Hermagoras of Temnos (Ancient Greek: Ἑρμαγόρας Τήμνου, fl. 1st century BC) was an Ancient Greek rhetorician of the Rhodian school and teacher of rhetoric in Rome, where the Suda states he died at an advanced age.

He appears to have tried to excel as an orator (or rather declaimer) as well as a teacher of rhetoric. But it is especially as a teacher of rhetoric that he is known to us. The members of his school, among whom numbered the jurist Titus Accius, called themselves Hermagorei. Hermagoras's chief opponents were Posidonius of Rhodes, who is said to have contended with him in argument in the presence of Pompey, and Athenaeus.

He devoted particular attention to what is called inventio, and made a peculiar division of the parts of an oration, which differed from that adopted by other rhetoricians. Cicero opposes his system, but Quintilian defends it, though in some parts the latter censures what Cicero approves of. But in his eagerness to systematize the parts of an oration, he was said to have entirely lost sight of the practical point of view from which oratory must be regarded.

He appears to have been the author of several works which are lost: the Suda mentions (graeca sunt, non leguntur) Ρητορικαί, Περὶ ἐξεργασίας, Περὶ φράσεως, Περὶ σχημάτων, and Περὶ πρέποντος, although perhaps some or all of these should be attributed to his younger namesake, Hermagoras Carion, the pupil of Theodorus of Gadara.

Hermagoras' method of dividing a topic into its "seven circumstances" (who, what, when, where, why, in what way, by what means), which he may have borrowed from Aristotle, provided the roots of the "5 W's" used widely in journalism, education, and police investigation to ensure thoroughness in the coverage of a particular incident or subject matter.

== Edition ==
- Dieter Mattes (ed.), Hermagorae Temnitae, Testimonia et Fragmenta (Bibliotheca scriptorum Graecorum et Romanorum Teubneriana), Leipzig: Teubner 1962.

== See also ==
- Cicero
- Rhetoric
- Rhetorica ad Herennium
