= Theodorus of Gadara =

Ancient Greek rhetorician

Theodorus of Gadara (Greek: Θεόδωρος ὁ Γαδαρεύς) was a Greek rhetorician of the 1st century BC from Gadara (present-day Um Qais, Jordan) who founded a rhetorical school in his native city. According to the Suda, he taught future Roman emperor Tiberius the art of rhetoric. Suetonius (c. 69 – after 122 AD) wrote of Tiberius that:

...even in his boyhood, his cruel and cold nature did not lie hidden. Theodorus of Gadara was his teacher of rhetoric and, in all his wisdom, seems to have been the first to have understood Tiberius and to have capped him with a very pithy saying when he taunted Tiberius, calling him 'Mud kneaded with blood'...

Theodorus was one of the two most famous rhetoric teachers of his time, the other being Apollodorus of Pergamon. Students of Apollodorus were commonly referred to as Apollodoreans, while students of Theodorus were known as Theodoreans.

He participated in sophistic contests with Potamo of Mytilene and Antipater in Rome. The Suda claims that he had a son, Antonius, who became a senator under Emperor Hadrian.

== Works ==
According to the Suda, Theodorus wrote the following books, among others:

- On Questions in Pronunciation (Περὶ τῶν ἐν φωναῖς ζητουμένων, in 3 books)
- On History (Περὶ ἱστορίας, 1 book)
- On Thesis (Περὶ θέσεως, 1 book)
- On the Similarity of Dialects and its Demonstration (Περὶ διαλέκτων ὁμοιότητος καὶ ἀποδείξεως, 2 books)
- On the Constitution (Περὶ πολιτείας, 2 books)
- On Coele Syria (Περὶ Κοίλης Συρίας, 1 book)
- On the Capacity of the Orator (Περὶ ῥήτορος δυνάμεως, 1 book)
