= Charmadas =

Classical Greek philosopher

Charmadas (Greek: Χαρμάδας; also Charmides (Χαρμίδης); 168/7 – 103/91 BC) was a Greek academic skeptic philosopher and a disciple of Carneades at the Academy in Athens. He was famous for his elegant style. Charmadas introduced the teaching of rhetoric into the Academy and is said to have had many students. He was a pupil of Carneades for seven years (145–138 BC) and later he led his own school in the Ptolemaion, a gymnasium in Athens. He was from Alexandria and seems to have lived there, before he went to Athens around 145 BC He was an excellent rhetorician and famous for his outstanding memory and for his ability to memorize whole books and then recite them. Like Philo of Larissa he seems to have pursued a more moderate philosophical scepticism. Lucius Licinius Crassus and Marcus Antonius (orator) were his most prominent pupils. Furthermore, Philodemus preserved us the names of other pupils: Diodorus of Adramyttion, Apollodor of Tarsus, Heliodorus of Mallos, Phanostratus of Tralles and a certain Apollonius.
