= Apollodorus of Pergamon =

Apollodorus (Ancient Greek: Ἀπολλόδωρος) of Pergamon was a rhetorician of ancient Greece who was the author of a school of rhetoric called after him Apollodoreios Hairesis (Ἀπολλοδωρειος αἵρεσις), which was subsequently opposed by the school established by Theodorus of Gadara (Θεοδώρειος αἵρεσις).

In his advanced age Apollodorus taught rhetoric at Apollonia, and here the young future Roman emperor Augustus was one of his pupils and became his friend. The geographer Strabo ascribes to him scientific works (τέχνας) on rhetoric, but Quintilian on the authority of Apollodorus himself declares only one of the works ascribed to him as genuine, and this he calls Ars (τέχνη) edita ad Matium, in which the author treated on oratory only insofar as speaking in the courts of justice was concerned.

Apollodorus himself wrote little, and his whole theory could be gathered only from the works of his disciples, Gaius Valgius and Dionysius Atticus. Lucian states that Apollodorus died at the age of eighty-two.
