= List of Roman moneyers during the Republic =

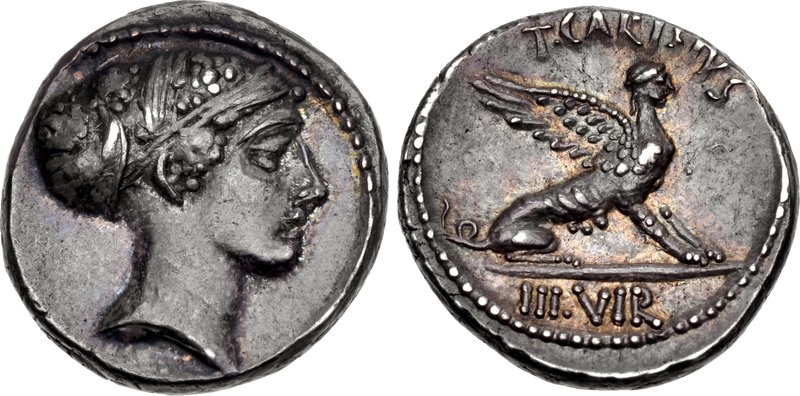
III • VIR on a coin of 46 BC.

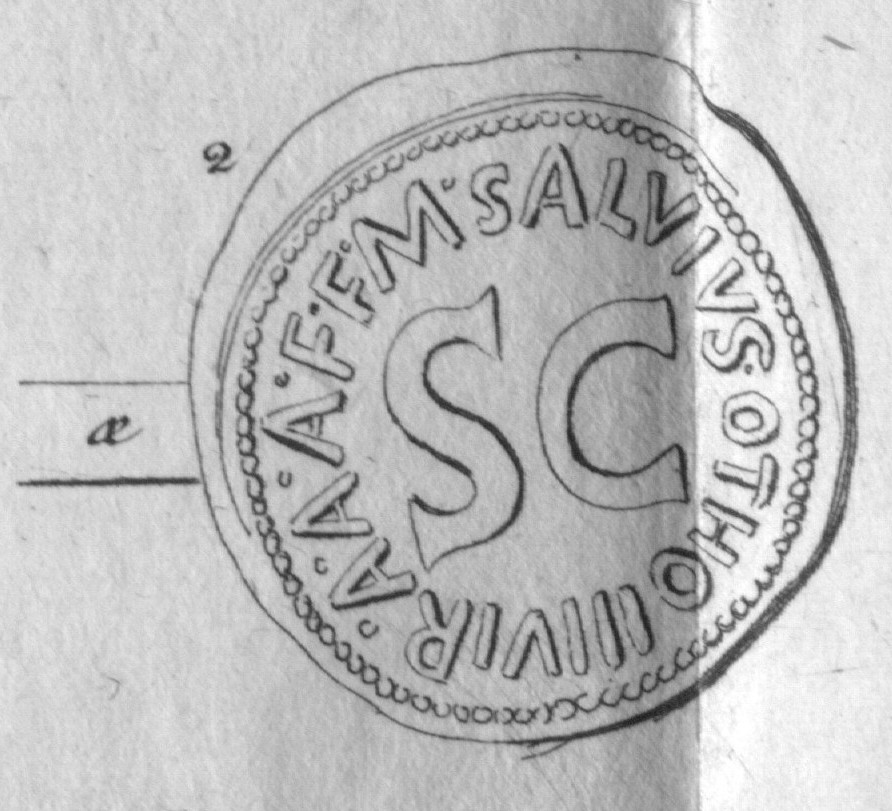
R/ M SALVIVS OTHO III VIR AAA FF around large S C: Cohen 515

During the Roman Republic, moneyers were called tresviri aere argento auro flando feriundo, literally "three men for casting (and) striking bronze, silver (and) gold (coins)". This was a board of the college of the vigintiviri, or Board of twenty (later briefly the Board of twenty-six), vigintisexviri. The title was abbreviated III. VIR. AAAFF. or even III. VIR. A.P.F. (tresviri ad pecuniam feriundam) on the coinage itself. These men were collectively known as the tresviri monetales or sometimes, less correctly, as the triumviri monetales. The singular is triumvir monetalis. In English, they are most correctly called mint magistrates, since 'moneyers' may imply that they actually struck the coins themselves.

In the early times of the Republic, there are few records of any officers who were charged with the superintendence of the mint, and there is little respecting the introduction of such officers apart from a very vague statement from Pomponius. It was thought by Niebuhr that they were introduced at the time when the Romans first began to coin silver, in 269 BC, but modern authors consider this too precise a reading of Pomponius. It is known that a college of three was in existence c. 150 BC. A fourth magistrate was briefly added by Julius Caesar in 44 BC during a time when the mint output was particularly large (in preparation for a war against Parthia).

These magistrates were responsible for the production of the Roman coinage. They were not simple mint workers (monetarii), they were officials who controlled the process, including the design on the coins themselves. Membership in the vigintisexvirate was for most of them the first step on the cursus honorum, the age when the post could be held appears to have been approximately 30, although some held it at a greater age and there is some evidence that the position was appointed rather than elected.

Some coins appear to have been special issues bearing the legend S C or EX S. C. (ex senatus consulto). Some of these special issues do not bear the signature of a triumvir monetalis, but the inscription CVR. X. FL. i. e. curator denariorum flandorum, or are signed by praetors (P), aediles (CVR AED), or quaestors (Q). During the Roman Empire, this appears on the bronze coinage only (except during the first few years of Nero's reign, when it is also found on the precious metal coinage), and it suggests that although the emperor kept the minting of gold and silver coins under his own authority, the Senate, as a sop to its pride, was allowed to retain nominal authority over bronze coinage.

In any case, the magistrate's control of the legend on the coinage lent itself to the production of coins often containing propagandistic political messaging. This served as self-advertising to further the potential political careers of the moneyers themselves, their families or that of their patrons.

== List of moneyers ==
This article incorporates text from Smith 1875, which is in the public domain.

Legend:

RRC #: Designation in Michael Crawford's Roman Republic Coinage (1974)
Babelon #: Designation in Ernest Babelon's Monnaies de la Republique Romaine (1885)
Career highlight: Highest known office held by moneyer
Leg.: Legate
Tr. Pl.: Tribune of the plebs
Q.: Quaestor
Pr.: Praetor
Propr.: Propraetor
Cos: Consul
Cos.Suff: Suffect consul
Cos desig.: Consul designate
Procos.: Proconsul
Pont.: Pontiff
Rex.Sacr.; Rex Sacrorum
Praef: Praefectus

=== 211-188 BC: First Denarii to the Peace of Apamea ===
RRC #	Babelon #	Inscription	Start	End	Moneyer	Career Highlight
63	N/A	C	211	211	L. Cornelius Lentulus	Pr. 211
64	N/A	MA	210	210	P. Manlius Vulso	Pr. 210
65	Aurelia 9-14	AVR	209	209	C. Aurunculeius	Pr. 209
74	Terentia 2-3	VAR	209	208	? Terentius Varro	?
75	Aelia 2	C.AL	209	208	C. Aelius	?
81	N/A	CN.CO	211	209	Cn. Cornelius Dolabella	Rex.Sacr. 208-180
101	N/A	KOP VAL	211	210	M. Valerius Laevinus	Propr. 211
111	Aelia 1	AL	211	208	Aelius	?
125	Lutatia 1	QLC	206	200	Q. Lutatius Catulus or Q. Lutatius Cerco	?
126	Terentia 1	VAR	206	200	A. Terentius Varro	Pr. 184
132	Caecilia 1-7	ME	194	190	Caecilius Metellus	?
133	Baebia 1,3-11	TAMP	194	190	Cn. Baebius Tamphilus or M. Baebius Tamphilus	Pr. 168 or Cos. 181
134	Plautia 1-7	LPLH	194	190	L. Plautius Hypsaeus	?
138	Maenia 1	P.MAE	194	190	P. Maenius	?
143	Maenia 2-6	Q.MAE	189	180	Q. Maenius	Pr. 170
144	Furia 1-6	LFP	189	180	L. Furius Philus	Pr. 171
146	Autronia 1	AVTR	189	180	L. Autronius	?
147	Domitia 1-2, 6	CN.DOM	189	180	Cn. Domitius Cn.f. L.n. Ahenobarbus	Cos. 162
148	Maria 1-6	Q.MARI	189	180	Q. Marius	?
149	Mamilia 1-5	L.MAMILI	189	180	L. Mamilius	?
150	Titinia 1-6	M.TITINI	189	180	M. Titinius M.f or M. Titinus Curvus	? or Pr. 178
151	Furia 17	S.FV	189	180	S. Furius	?
152	Quinctilia 1	SEX.Q	189	180	Sextus Quinctilius	?
153	Calpurnia 1	CN.CALP	189	180	Cn. Calpurnius	?
154	Coilia 1	L.COIL	189	180	L. Coelius	Leg. 170-169

=== 188-146 BC: Peace of Apamea - Sack of Carthage and Corinth ===
RRC #	Babelon #	Inscription	Start	End	Moneyer	Career Highlight
155	Furia 7,9,11	PVR	179	170	L. Furius Purpureo	Cos. 196
161	Juventia 1-6	TAL	179	170	P. Iuventius Thalna	Pr. 149
162	Matiena 2-8	MAT	179	170	Matienus	?
173	Clovia 6-10	C.SAX	169	158	C. Cluvius Saxula	Pr. 173
174	Caecilia 8-12	A.CAE	169	158	A. Caecilius A.f.	?
176	Aemilia 1	PAE	169	158	Paetus	?
178	Cornelia 11-14	CINA	169	158	L. Cornelius Cinna	Cos. 127
180	Clovia 1-5	SAX	169	158	Saxula	?
185	Terentia 4-6, 8-9	VARO	169	158	A. Terentius Varo	commissioner to L. Mummius, Cos. 146
186	Licinia 1-5	MVRENA	169	158	L. Licinius Murena	Pr. ?, commissioner to L. Mummius, Cos. 146
187	Furia 13,8	PVR	169	158	Furius Purpurio	?
188	Opeimia 1-5	OPEIMI	169	158	Q. Opimius	Cos. 154
189	Cornelia 6-10	P.BLAS	169	158	P. Cornelius P.f. Blasio	Pr. 140s
190	Opeimia 7-11	OPEI	169	158	Q. Opimius	Cos. 154
191	Valeria 1-6	VAL	169	158	Valerius	?
193	Papiria 1-5	TVRD	169	158	Papirius Turdus	Tr. Pl. 177
199	Atilia 1-6bis	SAR	155	155	Sex. Atilius Saranus/Serranus	Cos. 136
200	Pinaria 2-7	NAT	155	155	Pinarius Natta	?
201	Scribonia 1-7	C.SCR	154	154	C. Scribonius C.f.	Praef.Soc. 181
202	Juventia 7	C.TAL	154	154	C. Iuventius P.f. Thalna	?
203	Maiania 1-6	C.MAIANI	153	153	C. Maianius	?
204	Saufeia 1-5	L.SAVF	152	152	L. Saufeius	?
205	Cornelia 1-5	P.SVLA	151	151	P. Cornelius P.f. Sulla	?
207	Decimia 1	FLAVS	150	150	Decimius Flavus C.n.	?
208	Pinaria 1	NATTA	149	149	Pinarius Natta	?
209	Itia 1	L.ITI	149	149	L. Iteius or Iteilius	?
210	Junia 1-7	C.IVNI.C.F	149	149	C. Iunius C.f.	?
211	Caecilius 94	Q.ME	155	149	Q. Caecilius Metellus Macedonicus	Cos. 143
214	Atilia 8-15	M.ATILI SARAN	148	148	M. Atilius Saranus M.f.	?
215	Marcia 1-7	Q.MARC LIBO	148	148	Q. Marcus Libo	?
216	Sempronia 2-9	L.SEMP PITIO	148	148	L. Sempronius Pitio	?
217	Terentia 10-14	C.TER LVC	147	147	C. Terentius Lucanus	master of Terence?
218	Cupiennia 1	L.CVP	147	147	L. Cupiennius	?
219	Antestia 1-8	C.ANTESTI	146	146	C. Antestius	?

=== 145-106 BC: To Marius' first consulate ===
RRC #	Babelon #	Inscription	Start	End	Moneyer	Career Highlight
220	Iunia 8	M.IVNI	145	145	M. Iunius D.f. Silanus	Tr. Pl. between 149 and 123/2
221	Aurelia 19	AN RVF	144	144	T. Annius Rufus	Cos. 128
223	Curiatia 1	C.CVR TRIGE	142	142	C. Curiatius Trigeminus	?
224	Julia 1	L.IVLI	141	141	L. Iulius	?
225	Atilia 16	L.ATILI NOM	141	141	L. Atilius Nomentanus	on the staff of Q. Mucius Scaevola Pr. 120
226	Titinia 7-8	C.TITINI	141	141	C. Titinius	?
227	Aufidia 1	M.AVF RVS	140	140	M. Aufidius M.f. Rusticus	?
228	Valeria 7-10	C.VAL C.F FLAC	140	140	C. Valerius C.f. Flaccus	?
229	Aurelia 16	M.AVRELI COTA	139	139	M. Aurelius L.f. Cotta	?
230	Spurillia 1	A.SPVRI	139	139	A. Spurilius or Spurius or Spurinna	?
231	Renia 1-3	C.RENI	138	138	C. Renius	?
232	Gellia 1-6	CN.GELI	138	138	Cn. Gellius	historian
233	Aelia 3	P.PAETVS	138	138	P. Aelius Q.n. Paetus	?
234	Veturia 1-2	TI.VETVR	137	137	Ti. Veturius T.f. Gracchi	?
235	Pompeia 1-3	SEX.POM	137	137	Sex. Pompeius	Pr. 119?
236	Baebia 12	M.BAEBI Q.F TAMPIL	137	137	M. Baebius Q.f. Tampilus	?
237	Lucretia 1	CN.LVCR TRIO	136	136	Cn. Lucretius Trio	?
238	Antestia 9-11,13	L.ANTES GRAGV	136	136	L. Antestius Gragulus	?
239	Servilia 1-4	C.SERVEILI M.F	136	136	C. Serveilius M.f. C.n.	?
240	Curiatia 2-9	C.CVR F TRIG	135	135	C. Curiatius Trigeminus filius	?
241	Trebania 1-5	L.TREBANI	135	135	L. Trebanius	?
242	Minucia 3-6, 8	C.AVG	135	135	C. Minucius C.f. Augurinus	?
243	Minucia 9-10, 12-14	TI.MINVCI C.F AVGVRINI	134	134	Ti. Minucius C.f. Augurinus	?
244	Aburia 1-5	C.ABVRI GEM	134	134	C. Aburius Geminus	?
245	Marcia 8-10	M.MARC MN.F	134	134	M. Marcius Mn.f.	?
246	Numitoria 1-6	C.NVMITORI	133	133	C. Numitorius C.f. Lem	?
247	Calpurnia 2-4	P.CALP	133	133	P. Calpurnius	?
248	Minucia 15-18	L.MINVCI	133	133	L. Minucius	?
249	Maenia 7-10	P.MAE ANT M.F	132	132	P. Maenius M.f. Antias or Antiaticus	?
250	Aburia 6-8	M.ABVRI.M.F GEM	132	132	M. Aburius M.F. Geminus	?
251	Fabrinia 1-4	M.FABRINI	132	132	M. Fabrinius	?
252	Postumia 1	L.POST.ALB	131	131	L. Postumius L.f. Albinus	?
253	Opeimia 12-14	L.OPEIMI	131	131	L. Opimius Q.f.	Cos. 121
254	Opeimia 16	M.OPEIMI	131	131	M. Opeimus Q.f.	?
255	Acilia 4-7	M.ACILIVS M.F	130	130	M. Acilius M.f	?
256	Caecilia 21-26, 15-16	Q.METE	130	130	Q. Caecilius Metellus	Cos. 123
257	Terentia 7, Vargunteia 1-5	M.VARG	130	130	M. Vargunteius	?
258	Julia 2	SEX.IVLI CAISAR	129	129	Sex. Julius Caesar	Pr. 123
259	Marcia 11	Q.PILIPVS	129	129	Q. Marcius Q.n. Philippus	Pr. before 100
260	Cloulia 1	T.CLOVLI	128	128	T. Cloulius (Cloelius)	?
261	Domitia 14,3-5	CN.DOM	128	128	Cn. Domitius Ahenobarbus	?
262	Caecilia 38-42	Elephant's Head	128	128	L. Caecilius Metellus Diadematus or Delmaticus	Cos. 117 or Cos. 119
263	Caecilia 28,29,31-34	M.METELLVS Q.F	127	127	M. Caecilius Q.f. Q.n. Metellus	Cos. 115
264	Servilia 5,6,8-11	C.SERVEIL	127	127	C. Servilius Vatia	?
265	Fabia 5,8,10	Q.MAX	127	127	Q. Fabius Maximus	Cos. 116
266	Cassia 1-3	C.CASSI	126	126	C. Cassius C.f. Longinus	?
267	Quinctia 2-5	T.Q	126	126	T. Quinctius T.f. Flaminius	?
268	Fabia 11	N.FABI PICTOR	126	126	N. Fabius N.f. Q.n. Pictor	?
269	Caecilia 14,17,19	C.METELLVS	125	125	C. Caecilius Metellus Caprarius	Cos. 113
270	Porcia 3	M.PORC LAECA	125	125	M. Porcius Laeca	?
271	Acilia 1-3	MN.ACILI BALBVS	125	125	Mn. Acilius Balbus	Cos. 114
273	Fabia 1,4	Q.FABI LABEO	124	114	Q. Fabius Q.n. Q.f. Labeo	Procos. Hispania Citerior b. 118 & 114
274	Porcia 1-2	C.CATO	123	123	C. Porcius Cato	Cos. 114
275	Fannia 1-3	M.FAN C.F	123	123	M. Fannius C.f.	?
276	Papiria 6	M.CARBO	122	122	M. Papirius Carbo	Pr. ?, Sicily
277	Minucia 1-2	Q.MINV RVF	122	122	Q. Minucius Rufus	Leg. 110
278	Plutia 1	C.PLVTI	121	121	C. Plautius C.f.	?
279	Papiria 7,9	CARB	121	121	Cn. Papirius Carbo	?
280	Tullia 1	M.TVLLI	120	120	M. Tullius	?
281	Furia 18	M.FOVRI L.F PHILI	119	119	M. Furius L.f Philus	?
282/1	Aurelia 20	M.AVRELI SCAVRI	118	118	M. Aurelius M.f. Scaurus	Q. ?
282/1	Licinia 11-15	L.LIC	118	118	L. Licinius Crassus	Cos. 95
282/1	Domitia 15-19	CN.DOM	118	118	Cn. Domitius Ahenobarbus	Cos. 96
282/2	Cosconia 1	L.COSCO M.F	118	118	L. Cosconius M.f.	?
282/3	Poblicia 1	C.MALLE C.F	118	118	C. Publicius Malleolus C.f.	?
282/4	Pomponia 7	L.POMPONI CN.F	118	118	L. Pomponius Cn.f.	?
282/5	Porcia 8	L.PORCI LICI	118	118	L. Porcius Licinus	?
283	Marcia 16-17, Fabia 12-13, Roscia 1-2	Q.MAR	118	117	Q. Marcius	?
284	Calidia 1,3	M.CALID	117	116	M. Calidius	?
284	Fulvia 1,2	CN.FOVL	117	116	Cn. Fulvius	?
284	Caecilia 35-36	Q.MET	117	116	Q. Caecilius Metellus Numidicus or Nepos	Cos. 109 or Cos. 98
285	Domitia 7, 9-13	CN.DOMI	116	115	Cn. Domitius Cn.f. Cn.n. Ahenobarbus	?
285	Curtia 2-7	Q.CVRT	116	115	Q. Curtius	?
285	Junia 9-14	M.SILA	116	115	M. Iunius Silanus	?
286	Sergia 1	M.SERGI SILVS Q	116	115	M. Sergius Silus	Q. 116 or 115
288	Cornelia 18	CETEGVS	115	114	Cornelius Caethegus	?
289	Cipia 1,3-6	M.CIPI M.F	115	114	M. Cipius M.f.	?
290	Fonteia 1-6	C.FONT	114	113	C. Fonteius	Leg. 91
291	Aemilia 7	MN.AEMILIO LEP	114	113	Mn. Aemilius M.f. Lepidus	?
292	Licinia 7-10	P.NERVA	113	112	P. Licinius Nerva	Pr. 104
293	Marcia 12-14	L.PHILIPPVS	113	112	L. Marcius Q.f. Q.n. Philippus	Cos.91
294	Didia 2	T.DEIDI	113	112	T. Didius	Cos. 98
295	Manlia 2	L.TORQVA Q	113	112	L. Manlius Torquatus	Q. 113 or 112
296	Cornelia 19-23	CN.BLASIO CN.F	112	111	Cn. Cornelius Cn.f. Blasio	?
297	Quinctia 6	TI.Q	112	111	Ti. Quinctius or Quinctilius	?
298	Caesia 1	L.CAESI	112	111	L. Caesius or Caesilius	?
299	Claudia 2-3	AP.CL	111	110	Ap. Claudius Ap.f. C.n. Pulcher	Pr. 89, Cos. 79
299	Mallia1-2	T.MANL	111	110	T. Manlius Mancinus	Tr. Pl. 107
299	N/A	Q.VR	111	110	Q. Urbinius	?
300	Claudia 1	C.PVLCHER	110	109	C. Claudius Ap.f. C.n. Pulcher	Cos. 92
301	Porcia 4	P.LAECA	110	109	P. Porcius Laeca	Tr. Pl. 90s
302	Flaminia 1	L.FLAMINI CILO	109	108	L. Flaminius Chilo	?
303	Aquillia 1	MN.AQVIL	109	108	Mn. Aquillius	Cos. 101
304	Memmia 1	L.MEMMI	109	108	L. Memmius	visited Egypt as senator 112
305	Lutatia 2,5	Q.LVTATI CERCO Q	109	108	Q. Lutatius Cerco	Q. 109 or 108
306	Valeria 11	L.VALERI FLACCI	108	107	L. Valerius L.f. L.n. Flaccus	Cos. 100
307	Fonteia 7,8	MN.FONTEI	108	107	Mn. Fonteius	?
308	Herennia 1-4, Cornelia 37	M.HERENNI	108	107	M. Herennius M.f.	Cos. 93
309	Manlia 1	A.MANLI Q.F SER	118	107	A. Manlius Q.f. Sergianus	Leg. 107—105
310	Cornelia 17	CN.CORNEL.L.F SISENA	118	107	C. Cornelius L.f. Sisenna	Pr. ?119

=== 106-92 BC: Marius' consulates to the Social War ===
RRC #	Babelon #	Inscription	Start	End	Moneyer	Career Highlight
311	Cornelia 24	L.SCIP ASIAG	106	106	L. Cornelius Scipio Asiaticus	Cos. 83
312	Sulpicia 1-4	C.SVLPICI C.F	106	106	C. Sulpicius C.f.	?
313	Memmia 2-5	L.MEMMI GAL	106	106	L. Memmius Galeria	?
314	Aurelia 21	L.COT	105	105	L. Aurelius Cotta	Tr.Pl. 103, Pr. ?95
315	Hostilia 1	L.H.TVB	105	105	L. Hostilius Tubulus	?
316	Thoria 1	L.THORIVS BALBVS	105	105	L. Thorius Balbus	Leg. 79
317	Appuleia 1-3	L.SATVRN	104	104	Lucius Appuleius Saturninus	Tr.Pl. I:103 II:100
318	Coelia 2,3	C.COIL CALD	104	104	C. Coelius C.f. C.n. Caldus	Cos. 94
319	Minucia 19	Q.THERM M.F	103	103	Q. Minucius M.f. Thermus	on the consilium of Pompey Strabo at Asculum
320	Julia 4	L.IVLI L.F CAESAR	103	103	L. Julius L.f. Sex.n. Caesar	Cos. 90
321	Cassia 4	L.CASSI CAEICIAN	102	102	L. Cassius Caeicianus	?
322	Fabia 14-16	C.FABI C.F	102	102	C. Fabius C.f. Q.n. Hadrianus	Pr. 84, Propr. Africa 83
323	Julia 3	L.IVLI	101	101	L. Julius	?
324	Lucilia 1	M.LVCILI RVF	101	101	M. Lucilius Mn.f. M.n. Rufus	?
325	Sentia 1	L.SENTI.C.F	101	101	L. Sentius C.f.	Pr. ?93-89
326	Fundania 1,2	C.FVNDAN Q	101	101	C. Fundanius	Q. 101, possibly Pr. ?81
327	Servilia 13	M SERVEILI C.F	100	100	M. Servilius C.f. M.n. Vatia Isauricus	?
328	Servilia 14	P.SERVILI M.F RVLLI	100	100	P. Servilius M.f. Rullus	Probably the father of the Tr. Pl. of 63
329	Cornelia 25-27	LENT.MAR.F	100	100	P. Cornelius Lentulus Marcellinus	?
330	Calpurnia 5	PISO	100	100	L. Calpurnius Piso Caesoninus	Q. Ostiensis 100, Pr. 90
330	Servilia 12	CAEPIO Q	100	100	Q. Servilius Caepio	Q. Urbanus 100, ?Pr. 91
331	Vettia 1	P.SABIN Q	99	99	P. (Vettius ?) Sabinus	Q. 99
332	Cloulia 2	T.CLOVLI Q	98	98	T. Cloulius (Cloelius)	Leg. 83
333	Egnatuleia 1	C.EGNATVLEI C.F Q	97	97	C. Egnatuleius C.f.	Q. 97
334	Pomponia 6, 1-5	L.POMPON MOLO	97	97	L. Pomponius L.f. M.n. Molo	?
335	Poblicia 2-4, 6-8	C.MALL	96	96	C. Publicius Malleolus	Q. 80
335	Postumia 2-6	A.ALBINVS S.F	96	96	A. Postumius S(p).f. Albinus	killed at the battle of the Colline Gate, 82
335	Caecilia 45-46	L.METEL	96	96	L. Caecilius L.f. Q.n. Metellus Delmaticus	?
336	Aelia 4	C.ALLI BALA	92	92	C. Allius Bala	?

=== 92-79 BC: Social war through Sulla's dictatorship ===
RRC #	Babelon #	Inscription	Start	End	Moneyer	Career Highlight
337	Iunia 15-21, 23	D.SILANVS L.F	91	91	D. Iunius L.f. Silanus	?
340	Calpurnia 6-16, 18-21	L.PISO FRVGI	90	90	L. Calpurnius L.f. L.n. Piso Frugi	Tr. Pl. 89, Pr. 74
341	Titia 1-7	Q.TITI	90	90	Q. Titius Mutto	?
342	Vibia 1-15	C.VIBIVS C.F PANSA	90	90	C. Vibius C.f. Pansa	The father of the Cos. 43 BC
343	Porcia 5-7	M.CATO	89	89	M. Porcius Cato	?
344	Tituria 1-7, Turillia 1-2	L.TITVRI L.F SABIN	89	89	L. Titurius L.f. Sabinus	Leg. 75
345	Cornelia 50-53	CN.LENTVL	88	88	Cn. Cornelius Cn.f. Lentulus Clodianus	Cos. 72
346	Marcia 18-23	C.CENSORIN	88	88	C. Marcius Censorinus	Leg. 82
347	N/A	M.FONTEIUS	?	87	M. Fonteius	Q. 84, Pr. 75
348	Rubria 1-6, 8	L.RVBRI DOSSENI	87	87	L. Rubrius Dossenus	Probably the father of the Tr. Pl. ca. 49 BC L. Rubrius
349	Memmia 8	L.C.MEMIES L.F GAL	87	87	L. Memmius L.f. Gal.	?
349	Memmia 8	L.C.MEMIES L.F GAL	87	87	C. Memmius L.f. Gal.	?
350A	Gargonia 1-5	GAR	86	86	C. Gargonius	?
350A	Ogulnia 1-3, 5-12	OGVL	86	86	Ogulnius	?
350A	Vergilia 1, 3-12	VER	86	86	M. Vergilius or Verginius	Tr. Pl. 87
351	Fannia 4	M.FAN	86	86	M. Fannius	Aed. Pl. 86, Pr. 80
351	Critonia 1	L.CRIT	86	86	L. Critonius	Aed. Pl. 86
352	Julia 5-7	L.IVLI BVRSIO	85	85	L. Iulius Bursio	?
353	Fonteia 9-12, 14	MN.FONTEI C.F	85	85	Mn. Fonteius C.f.	?
354	Licinia 16,17	C.LICINIVS L.F MACER	84	84	C. Licinius L.f. Macer	Tr. Pl. 73, Pr. ?68
355	Cassia 5	C.CASSIVS	84	84	C. Cassius Longinus	Cos. 73
355	Julia 8	L.SALINAT	84	84	Livius Salinator	Leg. of Sertorius 81
356	Furia 19,20	P.FORIVS CRASSIPES AED.CVR	84	84	P. Furius Crassipes	Aed. Cur. 84
357	Norbana 1-2	C.NORBANVS	83	83	C. Norbanus C.f.	?
358	N/A	LATERENS	83	83	Mn. Iuventius L.f. Laterensis	Probably the father of Pr. 51
359	Cornelia 28-30	L.SVLLA IMPER.ITERVM	84	83	L. Cornelius L.f. P.n. Sulla Felix	Cos. I 88, II 80
360	Crepusia 2-3	P.CREPVSI	82	82	P. Crepusius	?
360	Mamilia 7-9	C.LIMETAN	82	82	C. Mamilius C.f. Limetanus	?
360	Marcia 25-27	L.CENSORIN	82	82	L. Marcius Censorinus	?
361	Crepusia 1	P.CREPVSI	82	82	P. Crepusius	?
362	Mamilia 6	C.MAMIL LIMETANUS C.F	82	82	C. Mamilius C.f. Limetanus	?
363	Marcia 24	L.CENSORIN	82	82	L. Marcius Censorinus	?
364	Antonia 1	Q.ANTO BALB PR	83	82	Q. Antonius Balbus	Pr. 82
365	Valeria 12	C.VAL FLA IMPERAT	82	82	C. Valerius C.f. L.n. Flaccus	Procos. 82 transalpine Gaul, Cos. 93
366	Annia 1-5	C.ANNIVS T.F T.N PRO.COS	82	81	C. Annius T.f. T.n. (Luscus)	Procos. 82, Spain
366	Fabia 17	L.FABI L.F HISP Q	82	81	L. Fabius L.f. Hispaniensis	Q. 82, Spain
366	Tarquitia 1	C.TARQVITI P.F Q	82	81	C. Tarquitius P.f.	Q. 82, Spain
367	Cornelia 38-43	L.SVLLA IMPE	84	83	L. Cornelius L.f. P.n. Sulla Felix	Cos. I 88, II 80
367	Manlia 3-8	L.MANLI PRO Q	82	82	L. Manlius L.f. Torquatus	ProQ. 82, Cos. 65
368	Cornelia 34	L.SVLLA IMPE	84	83	L. Cornelius L.f. P.n. Sulla Felix	Cos. I 88, II 80
369	Caecilia 30	M. METELLVS.Q.F	82	80	M. Caecilius Q.f. L.n. Metellus Pius	?
370	Servilia 7	C.SERVEIL	82	80	C. Servilius	?
371	Fabia 6	Q.MAX	82	80	Q. Fabius Maximus	?
372	Postumia 7,8	A.POST A.F S.N ALBIN	81	81	A. Postumius A.f. Sp.n. Albinus	?
374	Caecilia 43,44	Q.C.M.P.IMPER	81	81	Q. Caecilius Q.f. L.n. Metellus Pius	Cos. 80
377	Volteia 6	L.VOL L.F STRAB	81	81	L. Volumnius L.f. Ani.	on the consilium of Pompey Strabo at Asculum
378	Maria 7-9	C.MARI C.F CAPIT	81	81	C. Marius C.f. Capito	?
379	Procilia 1-2	L.PROCILI F	80	80	L. Procilius Filius	Senator 56
380	Poblicia 9	C.POBLICI Q.F	80	80	C. Publicius Q.f.	?
381	Cornelia 46-7, Manlia 9-10	A.MANLI A.F Q	80	80	A. Manlius A.f. Q.n.	?
382	Naevia 6	C.NAE BALB	79	79	C. Naevius Balbus	?
383	Claudia 5	TI.CLAVD TI.F AP.N	79	79	Ti. Claudius Ti.f. Ap.n. Nero	Pr. before 63 or 67
384	Papia 1	L.PAPI	79	79	L. Papius (Celsus)	Supposed father of the Monetalis' of 45

=== 78-59 BC: Pompey, Lepidus to Caesar's first consulship ===
RRC #	Babelon #	Inscription	Start	End	Moneyer	Career Highlight
385	Volteia 1-5	M.VOLTEI M.F	78	78	M. Volteius M.f	Perhaps a relative of Lucius Volteius mentioned by Cicero
386	Cassia 6	L.CASSI Q.F.	78	78	L. Cassius Q.f. Longinus	Pr. 66
387	Rutilia 1	L.RVTILI FLAC	77	77	L. Rutilius Flaccus	Senator 72
388	Satriena 1	P.SATRIENVS	77	77	P. Satrienus	?
389	Rustia 1	L.RVSTI	76	76	L. Rustius	?
390	Lucretia 2,3	L.LVCRETI TRIO	76	76	L. Lucretius Trio	?
391	Egnatia 1-3	C.EGNATIVS CN.F CN.N MAXSVMVS	75	75	C. Egnatius Cn.f. Cn.n. Maximus	?
392	Farsuleia 1-2	L.FARSVLEI MENSOR	75	75	L. Farsuleius Mensor	?
393	Cornelia 54,55	CN.LEN Q	76	75	Cn. Cornelius P.f. Lentulus Marcellinus	Cos. 56
393	Cornelia 54-55	LENT CVR * FL	76	75	Cn. Cornelius P.f. Lentulus Marcellinus	Cos. 56
394	Postumia 9	C.POSTVMI AT	74	74	C. Postumius At? or Ta?	?
395	Cossutia 1	L.COSSVTI C.F SABVLA	74	74	L. Cossutius C.f. Sabula	?
396	Plaetoria 2	L.PLAETORI L.F Q	74	74	L. Plaetorius L.f. (Cestianus)	Q. 74
397	Cornelia 58	P.LENT P.F L.N Q	74	74	P. Cornelius P.f. L.n. Lentulus Spinther	Cos. 57
398	Pomponia 23	Q.POMPONI RVFVS	73	73	Q. Pomponius Cn.f. Rufus	?
399	Crepereia 1-2	Q.CREPEREI M.F ROCVS	72	72	Q. Crepereius M.f. Rocus	Probably a brother or son of Tr. Mil. 69 Marcus Crepereius's (Rocus)
400	Axia 1-2	L.AXSIVS L.F NASO	71	71	L. Axsius L.f Naso	?
401	Aqullia 2	MN.AQVIL MN.F MN.N	71	71	Mn. Aquillius Mn.f.Mn.n	Senator 74
402	Pompeia 6	MAGNVS PROCOS	71	71	Cn. Pompeius Cn.f. Sex.n. Magnus	Cos. I:70, II:55, III:52
403	Fufia 1	KALENI	70	70	Q. Fufius Calenus	Cos. 47
403	Mucia 1	CORDI	70	70	P. Mucius Scaevola (Cordus)	Pont. 69
404	Vettia 2	T.VETTIVS SABINVS	70	70	T. Vettius Sabinus	Pr. 59
405	Plaetoria 5-7,9-10	M.PLAETORIVS CEST	69	69	M. Plaetorius M.f. Cestianus	Pr. 64?
406	Sulpicia 6-7	P.GALB AED.CVR	69	69	P. Sulpicius Galba	Pont. 69
407	Hosidia 1-2	C.HOSIDI.C.F GETA III.VIR	68	68	C. Hosidius C.f. Geta	proscribed 43
408	Calpurnia 24-29	C.PISO L.F FRVGI	67	67	C. Calpurnius Piso L.f. L.n. Frugi	Q. 58
409	Plaetoria 3-4	M.PLAETORIVS M.F CESTIANVS AED.CVR	67	67	M. Plaetorius M.f. Cestianus	Pr. ?64
410	Pomponia 8-22	Q.POMPONI MVSA	66	66	Q. Pomponius Musa	?
411	Manlia 11-12	L.TORQVAT III VIR	65	65	Lucius Manlius Torquatus	Pr. 49
412	Roscia 3	L.ROSCI FABATI	64	64	L. Roscius Fabatus	Pr. 49
413	Cassia 10	LONGIN III V	63	63	L. Cassius Longinus	Procos 48.
414	Furia 23	L.FVRI CN.F BROCCHI	63	63	L. Furius Cn.f. Brocchus	?
415	Aemilia 10	PAVLLVS LEPIDVS	62	62	L. Aemilius Lepidus Paullus	Cos. 50
416	Scribonia 8	LIBO	62	62	L. Scribonius Libo	Cos. 34?
417	Aemilia 11	PAVLLVS LEPIDVS	62	62	L. Aemilius Paullus Lepidus	Cos. 50
417	Scribonia 9	LIBO	62	62	L. Scribonius Libo	Cos. 34?
418	Calpurnia 22-23	M.PISO M.F FRVGI	61	61	M. Pupius M.f. Piso Frugi	Pr. 44
419	Aemilia 20-25	M.LEPIDVS	61	61	M. Aemilius Lepidus	III vir r.p.c.
420	Plautia 11-12	P.YPSAE	60	60	P. Plautius Hypsaeus	Pr. 55?
421	Nonia 1	SEX.NONI SVFENAS	59	59	M. Nonius Sufenas	Q. ca. 62, Tr. Pl. 56, Pr. 52, proPr. 51—50

=== 58-49 BC: Caesar in Gaul ===
RRC #	Babelon #	Inscription	Start	End	Moneyer	Career Highlight
422	Aemilia 8-9	M.SCAVR AED.CVR	58	58	M. Aemilius Scaurus	Aed.Cur. 58, Pr. 56
422	Plautia 8-10	P.HVPSAEVS AED.CVR	58	58	P. Plautius Hypsaeus	Pr. ?55
423	Servilia 15	C.SERVEIL C.F	57	57	C. Servilius C.f.	Tr.Mil. ?49
424	Considia 1	C.CONSIDI NONIANI	57	57	C. Considius Nonianus	Q. 63, Quaesitor 52, Propr. Gallia Cis. 49
425	Marcia 28-29	PHILIPPVS	56	56	L. Marcius Philippus or Q. Marcius Philippus	Cos. 38 or Pr. ?48
426	Cornelia 59-63	FAVSTVS	56	56	Faustus Cornelius L.f. L.n. Sulla	Q. 54
427	Memmia 9-10	C.MEMMI C.F	56	56	C. Memmius	Tr. Pl. 54
428	Cassia 7-9	Q.CASSIVS	55	55	Q. Cassius Longinus	Q. ?52
429	Fonteia 17-18, Didia 1	P.FONTEIVS P.F CAPITO	55	55	P. Fonteius P.f Capito	?
430	Licinia 18	P.CRASSVS M.F	55	55	P. Licinius M.f. Crassus	died at Carrhae 53
431	Plautia 13	A.PLAVTIVS AED.CVR	55	55	A. Plautius	Tr.Pl. 56, Aed.Cur. 55, Pr. 51
432	Plancia 1	CN.PLANCIVS AED.CVR	55	55	Cn. Plancius	Q. 58, Tr.Pl. 56, Aed.Cur. 54
433	Iunia 30-32	BRVTVS	54	54	M. Junius Brutus (Q. Servilius Caepio Brutus)	Cos. Desig. 41
434	Pompeia 4-5, Cornelia 48,49	Q.POMPEI RVFI	54	54	Q. Pompeius Q.n. Rufus	Tr.Pl. 52
435	Valeria 13	MESSAL.F	53	53	M. Valerius Messala	Cos. Suff. 32
436	Vinicia 1	L.VINICI	52	52	L. Vinicius	Tr.Pl. 51, Cos. Suff. 33
437	Coelia 4-5, 7-12	CALDVS IIIVIR	51	51	C. Coelius Caldus	Q. 50
438	Sulpicia 8	SERV.SVLP	51	51	Ser. Sulpicius Ser.f. Q.n.	?
439	Cornelia 69, Claudia 11	MARCELLINUS	50	50	P. Cornelius Lentulus Marcellinus	Q. 48
440	Sicinia 5	Q.SICINIVS III VIR	49	49	Q. Sicinius	?
441	Claudia 7, Cornelia 68, Neria 1	NERI Q.VRB	49	49	Cn. Nerius	Q. Urbanus 49
442	Acilia 8	MN.ACILIVS III.VIR	49	49	Mn. Acilius Glabrio	?

=== 49-44 BC: Crossing the Rubicon to the Ides of March ===
RRC #	Babelon #	Inscription	Start	End	Moneyer	Career Highlight
443	Julia 9	CAESAR	49	48	C. Julius C.f. C.n. Caesar	Cos I:59, II:48, II:46, IV:45, V:44
444	Coponia 1-3	C.COPONIVS PR	49	49	C. Coponius	Pr. 49
444	Sicinia 1-2, 4	Q.SICINIVS III.VIR	49	49	Q. Sicinius	?
445	Cornelia 64-67, Neria 2	L.LENTVLVS	49	49	L. Cornelius P.f. Lentulus Crus	Cos. 49
445	Claudia 9-10	C.MARC COS	49	49	C. Claudius M.f. M.n. Marcellus	Cos. 49
446	Pompeia 8	MAGN.PRO.COS	49	49	Cn. Pompeius Cn.f. Sex.n. Magnus	Cos. I:70, II:55, III:52
446	Calpurnia 30	CN.PISO PROQ	49	49	Cn. Calpurnius Piso (Frugi?)	proQ. 49, Cos. Suff. 23
447	Terentia 15	VARRO PRO.Q	49	49	M. Terentius Varro	proQ. 49, Spain
447	Pompeia 7	MAGN.PRO.COS	49	49	Cn. Pompeius Cn.f. Sex.n. Magnus	Cos. I:70, II:55, III:52
448	Hostilia 2, 4-5	L.HOSTILIVS SASERNA	48	48	L. Hostilius Saserna	?
449	Vibia 16-21	C.VIBIVS C.F C.N PANSA	48	48	C. Vibius C.f. C.n. Pansa Caetronianus	Cos. 43
450	Junia 25-26, Postumia 10-11, 13-14	ALBINVS BRVTI F	48	48	D. Junius Brutus Albinus	Cos. Desig. 42
451	Vibia 22	C.VIBIVS C.F C.N PANSA	48	48	C. Vibius C.f. C.n. Pansa Caetronianus	Cos. 43
451	Junia27	ALBINVS BRVTI F	48	48	D. Junius Brutus Albinus	Cos. Desig. 42
452	Julia 25-29	CAESAR	48	47	C. Julius C.f. C.n. Caesar	Cos I:59, II:48, II:46, IV:45, V:44
453	Plautia 14-15	L.PLAVTIVS PLANCVS	47	47	L. Plautius Plancus	Pr. 43
454	Licinia 23-27	A.LICINI NERVA III VIR	47	47	A. Licinius Nerva	?
455	Antia 1-6	C.ANTIVS C.F RESTIO	47	47	C. Antius C.f. Restio	proscribed 43
456	Julia 15	CAESAR DICT ITER	47	46	C. Julius C.f. C.n. Caesar	Cos I:59, II:48, II:46, IV:45, V:44
457	Alliena 1	A. ALLIENVS PRO.COS	47	47	A. Allienus	Q. ca. 62, Tr. Pl. 55, Pr. 49, proCos. 47
457	Julia 14	CAESAR	47	47	C. Julius C.f. C.n. Caesar	Cos I:59, II:48, II:46, IV:45, V:44
458	Julia 10	CAESAR	47	47	C. Julius C.f. C.n. Caesar	Cos I:59, II:48, II:46, IV:45, V:44
459	Caecilia 47	Q.METEL.PIVS SCIPIO IMP	47	46	Q. Caecilius Q.f. Q.n. Metellus Pius Scipio Nasica	Tr. Pl. 59, Aed. 57, Pr. 55, Cos. 52
460	Caecilia 48-49, 51-52	Q.METEL.PIVS SCIPIO IMP	47	46	Q. Caecilius Q.f. Q.n. Metellus Pius Scipio Nasica	Tr. Pl. 59, Aed. 57, Pr. 55, Cos. 52
460	Licinia 19-22	P.CRASSUS IVN.LEG.PRO.PR	47	46	P. Licinius Crassus Iunianus	Tr. Pl. 53, Leg., Propr. 47
461	Caecilia 50	Q.METEL.PIVS SCIPIO IMP	47	46	Q. Caecilius Q.f. Q.n. Metellus Pius Scipio Nasica	Cos. 52
461	Eppia 1	EPPIUS LEG.F.C	47	46	M. Eppius	Q. 52, Legatus fisci castrensis 46, Leg. 44
462	Porcia 9-11	M.CATO PRO.PR	47	46	M. Porcius Cato (Uticensis)	Tr. Mil 67—66, Tr. Pl. 62, Pr. de repetundis 54, Propr. 47—46
463	Cordia 1-9	MN.CORDIVS RVFVS IIIVIR	46	46	Mn. Cordius Rufus	?
464	Carisia 1-13	T.CARISIVS IIIVIR	46	46	T. Carisius	?
465	Considia 2-11	C.CONSIDI PAETI	46	46	C. Considius Paetus	The adopted son G. Considius Longus
466	Julia 22-23	C.CAESAR COS.TER	46	46	C. Julius C.f. C.n. Caesar	Cos I:59, II:48, II:46, IV:45, V:44
466	Hirtia 1-2	A.HIRTIVS PR	46	46	A. Hirtius	Tr. Pl. 48, Pr. 46, Cos. 43
467	Julia 16	COS.TERT DICT.ITER AVGVR PONT.MAX	46	46	C. Julius C.f. C.n. Caesar	Cos I:59, II:48, II:46, IV:45, V:44
468	Julia 11-12	CAESAR	46	45	C. Julius C.f. C.n. Caesar	Cos I:59, II:48, II:46, IV:45, V:44
469	Pompeia 9	CN.MAGNVS IMP	46	45	Cn. Pompeius Cn.f. Cn.n. Magnus	Imp 46-45
469	Poblicia 10	M.POBLICI LEG.PRO PR	46	45	M. Publicius	Leg., Propr. 46—45
470	Pompeia 10-12,14	CN. MAGNVS IMP.F	46	45	Cn. Pompeius Cn.f. Cn.n. Magnus	Imp 46-45
470	Minatia 1-3,5	M. MINAT.SABIN.PR.Q	46	45	M. Minatius Sabinus	ProQ. 46-5
471	Pompeia 15	CN.MAG.IMP	46	45	Cn. Pompeius Cn.f. Cn.n. Magnus	Imp 46-45
472	Papia 2-7	L.PAPIVS CELSVS III VIR	45	45	L. Papius L.f. Celsus	Supposed son of the Monetalis' of 79
473	Lollia 1-4	PALIKANVS	45	45	? Lollius M.f. Palicanus	?
474	Valeria 14-23	L.VALERIVS ACISCVLVS	45	45	L. Valerius Acisculus	Probably the son of the Tr. Pl. of 82, Tr. Pl.?
475	Munatia 1-3	L.PLANC.PRAEF.VRB	45	45	L. Plancius	Praef Urb. 45
475	Julia 18-20	C.CAES.DIC.TER	45	45	C. Julius C.f. C.n. Caesar	Cos I:59, II:48, II:46, IV:45, V:44
476	Clovia 11	C.CLOVI PRAEF	45	45	C. Cluvius	Praef. Cisalpine Gaul 46—45
476	Julia 17	CAESAR DIC.TER	45	45	C. Julius C.f. C.n. Caesar	Cos I:59, II:48, II:46, IV:45, V:44
477	Pompeia 16-18	SEX.MAGNVS PIVS IMP	45	45	Sex. Pompeius Cn.f. Cn.n. Magnus Pius	Imp 46-45, Cos. Desig 35
478	Pompeia 19	MAGNVS PIVS IMP. F	45	44	Sex. Pompeius Cn.f. Cn.n. Magnus Pius	Imp 46-45, Cos. Desig 35
478	Eppia 2,4	EPPIVS LEG	45	44	Eppius	?
479	Pompeia 20	MAGNVS PIVS IMP	45	?	Sex. Pompeius Cn.f. Cn.n. Magnus Pius	Imp 46-45, Cos. Desig 35
480/1	Julia 38, Aemilia 12	L.BVCA	44	44	L. Aemilius Buca	?
480/2	Julia 31, Mettia 3	M.METTIVS CAESAR.DICT.QVART	44	44	M. Mettius	?
480/3	Julia 32, Mettia 4	M.METTIUS CAESAR IMP	44	44	M. Mettius	?
480/4	Julia 34, Aemilia 13	CAESAR.IM P M L. AEMILIVS BVCA	44	44	L. Aemilius Buca	?
480/5	Julia 46, Sepullia 1	CAESAR IMP P.SEPVLLIVS MACER	44	44	P. Sepullius Macer	?
480/6	Julia 37, Aemilia 17	L.BVCA CAESAR.DICT PERPETVO	44	44	L. Aemilius Buca	?
480/7	Julia 36, Aemilia 15,16	L.BVCA CAESAR.DICT PERPETVO	44	44	L. Aemilius Buca	?
480/8	Julia 35, Aemilia 14	L.BVCA	44	44	L. Aemilius Buca	?
480/9	N/A	CAESAR IMP P.SEPVLLIVS MACER	44	44	P. Sepullius Macer	?
480/10	Julia 48, Sepullia 3	CAESAR IMP P.SEPVLLIVS MACER	44	44	P. Sepullius Macer	?
480/11	Julia 49, Sepullia 4	CAESAR IMP P.SEPVLLIVS MACER	44	44	P. Sepullius Macer	?
480/12	N/A	CAESAR DICT.PERPETVO P.SEPVLLIVS MACER	44	44	P. Sepullius Macer	?
480/13	Julia 50, Sepullia 5	CAESAR DICT.PERPETVO P.SEPVLLIVS MACER	44	44	P. Sepullius Macer	?
480/14	N/A	CAESAR DICT.PERPETVO P.SEPVLLIVS MACER	44	44	P. Sepullius Macer	?
480/15	Julia 42, Cossutia 4	CAESAR DICT.IN.PERPETVO C.COSSVTIVS MARIDIANVS	44	44	C. Cossutius Maridianus	?
480/16	Julia 41, Cossutia 3	CAESAR DICT.IN.PERPETVO C.COSSVTIVS MARIDIANVS	44	44	C. Cossutius Maridianus	?
480/17	Julia 33, Mettia 5	CAESAR IMPER M.METTIVS	44	44	M. Mettius	?
480/18	Julia 47, Sepullia 2	CAESAR IMPER P.SEPVLLIVS MACER	44	44	P. Sepullius Macer	?
480/19	Julia 43, Cossutia 2	CAESAR PARENS.PATRIAE C.COSSVTIVS MARIDIANVS AAAFF	44	44	C. Cossutius Maridianus	?
480/20	Julia 51, Sepullia 6	CAESAR PARENS.PATRIAE P.SEPVLLIVS MACER	44	44	P. Sepullius Macer	?
480/21	Julia 52, Sepullia 7	CLEMENTIAE CAESARIS P.SEPVLLIVS MACER	44	44	P. Sepullius Macer	?
480/22	Antonia 2, Sepullia 8	P.SEPVLLIVS MACER	44	44	P. Sepullius Macer	?
480/23	Mettia 1	M.METTI	44	44	M. Mettius	?
480/24	Aemilia 18, Julia 39	L.AEMILIVS.BVCA.IIIVIR	44	44	L. Aemilius Buca	?
480/25	Sepullia 9	P.SEPVLLIVS MACER	44	44	P. Sepullius Macer	?
480/26	Aemilia 19, Julia 40	L.AEMILIVS.BVCA	44	44	L. Aemilius Buca	?
480/27	Sepullia 11-12	P.SEPVLLIVS	44	44	P. Sepullius Macer	?
480/28	Mettia 2	M.METTI	44	44	M. Mettius	?

=== 44-42 BC: From the Ides of March to Philippi ===
RRC #	Babelon #	Inscription	Start	End	Moneyer	Career Highlight
481	Julia 30	CAES.DIC.QVAR.COS.QVINC	44	44	C. Julius C.f. C.n. Caesar	Cos I:59, II:48, II:46, IV:45, V:44
482	Julia 13	CAESAR IMP	44	44	C. Julius C.f. C.n. Caesar	Cos I:59, II:48, II:46, IV:45, V:44
483	Nasidia 1,2,4, Pompeia 28-30	Q.NASIDIVS	44	43	Q . Nasidius	Praef fleet to 35, Praef. Class. 31
484	Antonia 148	C. ANTONIVS M.F PROCOS	43	43	M. Antonius M.f. M.n.	Cos. I:44, II:34, Cos. Desig. 31
485	Flaminia 2-3, Julia 44-45	L.FLAMINIVS CHILO IIII.VIR PRI.FL	43	43	L. Flaminius Chilo	?
486	Accoleia 1	P.ACCOLEIVS LARISCOLVS	43	43	P. Accoleius Lariscolus	?
487	Petillia 1-4	PETILLIVS CAPITOLINVS	43	43	Petillius Capitolinus	?
488	Antonia 4-6, Julia 54-55	M.ANTONI	43	43	M. Antonius M.f. M.n.	Cos. I:44, II:34, Cos. Desig. 31
489	Antonia 8, 10-13, 7, 32	M.ANTONI	43	42	M. Antonius M.f. M.n.	Cos. I:44, II:34, Cos. Desig. 31
489	Aemilia 27-31	M.LEPIDVS	43	42	M. Aemilius M.f. Q.n. Lepidus	Cos. I:46, II:42
490	Julia 63-65	C.CAESAR	43	43	C. Julius C.f. C.n. Caesar (Octavian)	Cos.Suff 43, Cos. II:33, III:31
491	Cestia 1-3	L.CESTIVS	43	43	L. Cestius	?
491	Norbana 3-5	C.NORBANVS PR	43	43	C. Norbanus	Pr. 43
492	Antonia 36, 39	M.ANTONIVS IIIVIR R.P.C.	43	43	M. Antonius M.f. M.n.	Cos. I:44, II:34, Cos. Desig. 31
492	Aemilia 33	M.LEPIDVS.III.VIR.R.P.C.	43	43	M. Aemilius M.f. Q.n. Lepidus	Cos. I:46, II:42
492	Julia 75	C.CAESAR.III.VIR.R.P.C.	43	43	C. Julius C.f. C.n. Caesar (Octavian Augustus)	Cos.Suff 43, Cos. II:33, III:31
493	Julia 77	C.CAESAR.III.VIR.R.P.C.PONT.AVG	43	43	C. Julius C.f. C.n. Caesar (Octavian Augustus)	Cos.Suff 43, Cos. II:33, III:31
493	Antonia 41	M.ANTONIVS IIIVIR R.P.C.PONT.AVG	43	43	M. Antonius M.f. M.n.	Cos. I:44, II:34, Cos. Desig. 31
494	Livineia 1-13	L.LIVINEIVS REGVLVS	42	42	L. Livineius Regulus	?
494	Claudia 20,23, Clodia 14-19,21,24	P.CLODIVS M.F	42	42	P. Clodius M.f.	?
494	Vibia 23-31,33	C.VIBIVS VARVS	42	42	C. V(e)ibius V(a)arus	?
494	Mussidia 1-15	L.MVSSIDIVS LONGVS	42	42	L. Mussidius T.f. Longus	?
495	Aemilia 34-25	LEPIDVS PONT.MAX.III VIR R.P.C	42	42	M. Aemilius M.f. Q.n. Lepidus	Cos. I:46, II:42
495	Julia 70,71	CAESAR IMP III VIR R.P.C.	42	42	C. Julius C.f. C.n. Caesar (Octavian Augustus)	Cos.Suff 43, Cos. II:33, III:31
496	Antonia 34, 31, 29	M.ANTONI IMP.III VIR R.P.C	42	42	M. Antonius M.f. M.n.	Cos. I:44, II:34, Cos. Desig. 31
497	Julia 66-67, 89	CAESAR III VIR R.P.C.	42	42	C. Julius C.f. C.n. Caesar (Octavian Augustus)	Cos.Suff 43, Cos. II:33, III:31
498	N/A	M.AQVINVS.LEG	43	42	M. Aquinus	Leg. 43-42
498	Cassia 12	C.CASSI PR.COS	43	42	C. Cassius Longinus	ProCos.43-42
499	N/A	M.AQVINVS.LEG	43	42	M. Aquinus	Leg. 43-42
499	Cassia 13	C.CASSI PR.COS	43	42	C. Cassius Longinus	Procos.43-42
500	Cssia 14-18	C.CASSI IMP	43	42	C. Cassius Longinus	Procos.43-42
500	Junia 40-41	Q.CAEPIO.BRVTVS	43	42	M. Junius Brutus (Q. Servilius Caepio Brutus)	Cos. Desig. 41
500	Cornelia 70-76	LENTVLVS.SPINT	43	42	L. Cornelius Lentulus Spinther	Q.44
501	Junia 34	CAEPIO.BRVTVS PRO.COS	43	42	M. Junius Brutus (Q. Servilius Caepio Brutus)	Cos. Desig. 41
502	Junia 36-39	Q.CAEPIO BRVTVS PRO.COS	43	42	M. Junius Brutus (Q. Servilius Caepio Brutus)	Cos. Desig. 41
502	Sestia 1-4	L.SESTI PRO.Q	43	42	L. Sestius	ProQ. 43-42
503	Junia 35	Q.CAEPIO.BRVTVS IMP	43	42	M. Junius Brutus (Q. Servilius Caepio Brutus)	Cos. Desig. 41
504	Flavia 1	C.FLAV.HEMIC.LEG.PROPR	43	42	C. Flavius Hemic?	Propr 43-42
504	Junia 49	Q.CAEPIO.BRVTVS IMP	43	42	M. Junius Brutus (Q. Servilius Caepio Brutus)	Cos. Desig. 41
505	Servilia 38-42	M.SERVLIVS.LEG	43	42	M. Servilius	Leg. 43-2
505	Cassia 19-21	C.CASSI.IMP	43	42	C. Cassius Longinus	Procos.43-42
505	Junia 47-48	Q.CAEPIO.BRVTVS IMP	43	42	M. Junius Brutus (Q. Servilius Caepio Brutus)	Cos. Desig. 41
506	Junia 42, 43, 33	BRVTVS IMP	43	42	M. Junius Brutus (Q. Servilius Caepio Brutus)	Cos. Desig. 41
506	Pedania 1-2	COSTA LEG	43	42	(P.) Pedanius Costa	Leg. 43-2
507	Junia 44-46	BRVTVS IMP	43	42	M. Junius Brutus (Q. Servilius Caepio Brutus)	Cos. Desig. 41
507	Servilia 35-37	CASCA LONGVS	43	42	P. Servilius Casca Longus	Tr.Pl. 43, Leg. 42
508	Junia 50-52	BRVT IMP	43	42	M. Junius Brutus (Q. Servilius Caepio Brutus)	Cos. Desig. 41
508	Plaetoria 11-13	L.PLAET CEST	43	42	L. Plaetorius Cestianus	Q. 42
509	Cornuficia 1-4	Q.CORNVFICI.AVGVR.IMP	42	42	Q. Cornuficius	Augur 47-42
510	Statia 1	MVRCVS IMP	42	42	L. Staius Murcus	Pr. 45,

=== 42-31 BC: Philippi to Actium ===
RRC #	Babelon #	Inscription	Start	End	Moneyer	Career Highlight
511	Pompeia 21-27	MAG.PIVS IMP.ITER.PRAEF.CLAS.ET ORAE MARIT	42	40	Sex. Pompeius Cn.f. Cn.n. Magnus Pius	Imp 46-45, Cos. Desig 35
512	Clodia 12-13	C.CLODIVS C.F. VESTALIS	41	41	C. Clodius C.f. Vestalis	Procos ?
513	Arria 1-3	M.ARRIVS SECVNDVS	41	41	M. Arrius Q.f. Secundus	?
514	Numonia 1-2	C. NVMONIVS VAALA	41	41	C. Numonius Vaala	Probably a descendant of Publius Gessius P.f. Vala
515	Sulpicia 9-10	L.SERVIVS RVFVS	41	41	L. Servius Rufus	?
516	Antonia 434-6	ANT.AVG.IMP.III V.R.P.C.	41	41	M. Antonius M.f. M.n.	Cos. I:44, II:34, Cos. Desig. 31
517	Barbatius 1	M.BARBAT Q.P	41	41	M. Barbatius Pollio	Q. 41
517	Cocceius 13	M.NERVA PROQ.P	41	41	M. Cocceius Nerva	Cos. 36
517	Gellius 18	L.GELL.Q.P	41	41	L. Gellius L.f. L.n. Poplicola	Cos. 36
517	Antonia 30	ANT.AVG.IMP.III V.R.P.C.	41	41	M. Antonius M.f. M.n.	Cos. I:44, II:34, Cos. Desig. 31
518	Julia 91,97	C.CAESAR III VIR R.P.C.	41	41	C. Julius C.f. C.n. Caesar (Octavian Augustus)	Cos.Suff 43, Cos. II:33, III:31
518	Cornelia 78	BALBUS PRO.PR	41	41	L. Cornelius L.f. Balbus	Cos. Suff. 40
519	Domitia 20-21	CN.DOMITIVS L.F. IMP.AHENOBAR	41	41	Cn. Domitius L.f. Cn.n. Ahenobarbus	Cos. 32
520	Antonia 35	M.ANT.IMP.IIIVIR R.P.C.	40	40	M. Antonius M.f. M.n.	Cos. I:44, II:34, Cos. Desig. 31
521	Domitia 22-23	CN.DOMITIVS IMP.AHENOBARBVS IMP	41	41	Cn. Domitius L.f. Cn.n. Ahenobarbus	Cos. 32
521	Antonia 55-56	M.ANTON IMP.III VIR R.P.C.	39	39	M. Antonius M.f. M.n.	Cos. I:44, II:34, Cos. Desig. 31
522	Antonia 57-59	M.ANTON IMP.AVG.III VIR R.P.C.	40	40	M. Antonius M.f. M.n.	Cos. I:44, II:34, Cos. Desig. 31
522	Munatia 4-6	L.PLANCVS	40	40	L. Plancius	Procos 40.
523	Julia 92-93	C.CAESAR III VIR R.P.C.	40	40	C. Julius C.f. C.n. Caesar (Octavian Augustus)	Cos.Suff 43, Cos. II:33, III:31
523	Salvia 1-2	Q.SALVIVS IMP.COS.DESIG	40	40	Q. Salvidienus Rufus Salvius	Cos.Desig. 40
524	Atia 2-3	Q.LABIENVS PARTHICVS IMP	40	40	Q. Labienus Parthicus	??????
525	Sempronia 10-13	TI.SEMPRONIVS GRACCVS IIIIVIR Q.DESIG	40	?	Ti. Sempronius Gracchus	Q. Desig. ?40
525	Julia 125-128	DIVI IVLI.F	40	?	C. Julius C.f. C.n. Caesar (Octavian Augustus)	Cos.Suff 43, Cos. II:33, III:31
526	Julia 121-124	DIVI IVLI.F	40	?	C. Julius C.f. C.n. Caesar (Octavian Augustus)	Cos.Suff 43, Cos. II:33, III:31
526	Voconia 1-4	Q.VOCONIVS VITVLVS Q.DESIGN	40	?	Q. Voconius Vitulus	?
527	Antonia 33	M.ANT.IMP.IIIVIR R.P.C.	39	39	M. Antonius M.f. M.n.	Cos. I:44, II:34, Cos. Desig. 31
528	Antonia 37-38, 40	M.ANT.IMP.IIIVIR R.P.C.AVG	39	39	M. Antonius M.f. M.n.	Cos. I:44, II:34, Cos. Desig. 31
528	Julia 72-74, 76	CAESAR.IMP.IIIVIR R.P.C.AVG	39	39	C. Julius C.f. C.n. Caesar (Octavian Augustus)	Cos.Suff 43, Cos. II:33, III:31
529	Julia 59-62, 68	C.CAESAR IMP	39	39	C. Julius C.f. C.n. Caesar (Octavian Augustus)	Cos.Suff 43, Cos. II:33, III:31
529	Antonia 14-18, 68	M.ANTONIVS IMP	39	39	M. Antonius M.f. M.n.	Cos. I:44, II:34, Cos. Desig. 31
530	Antonia 65	ANTONIVS IMP	?	39	M. Antonius M.f. M.n.	Cos. I:44, II:34, Cos. Desig. 31
530	Sempronia 14	L.ATRATINVS AVGVR	?	39	L. Sempronius Atratinus	Cos.Suff. 34
531	Antonia 63	M.ANT.IMP.IIIVIR R.P.C.	39	39	M. Antonius M.f. M.n.	Cos. I:44, II:34, Cos. Desig. 31
531	Ventidia 1	P.VENTIDI.PONT.IMP	39	39	P. Ventidius P.f. Bassus	Cos. Suff 43
532	N/A	DOM.COS.ITER. IMP	39	39	Cn. Domitius M.f. M.n. Calvinus	Cos. I:53, II:40, Pont. 45-20
533	Antonia 68-70, 80	M.ANTONIVS M.F M.N AVGVR IMP.TERT.III VIR R.P.C.COS.DESIG.ITER.ET TERT.	38	38	M. Antonius M.f. M.n.	Cos. I:44, II:34, Cos. Desig. 31
534	Vipsania 1-3	M.AGRIPPA COS.DESIG	38	38	M. (Vipsanius) Agrippa L.f.	Cos. I:37, II:28, II:27
534	Julia 129-131	IMP DIVI IVLI F.TER.IIVIR R.P.C.	38	38	C. Julius C.f. C.n. Caesar (Octavian Augustus)	Cos.Suff 43, Cos. II:33, III:31
534	Julia 129-131	IMP CAESAR DIVI IVLI F.	38	38	C. Julius C.f. C.n. Caesar (Octavian Augustus)	Cos.Suff 43, Cos. II:33, III:31
535	Julia 98-99	CAESAR DIVI F DIVOS IVLVS	38	38	C. Julius C.f. C.n. Caesar (Octavian Augustus)	Cos.Suff 43, Cos. II:33, III:31
536	Antonia 76-78	M.ANT.AVG III VIR R.P.C.IMP TER	37	37	M. Antonius M.f. M.n.	Cos. I:44, II:34, Cos. Desig. 31
537	Julia 135-136	IMP.CAESAR DIVI F III VIR ITER.R.P.C.COS.ITER.ET TER.DESIG	37	37	C. Julius C.f. C.n. Caesar (Octavian Augustus)	Cos.Suff 43, Cos. II:33, III:31
538	Julia 140, 137	IMP.CAESAR DIVI F III VIR ITER.R.P.C.COS.ITER.ET TER.DESIG	37	37	C. Julius C.f. C.n. Caesar (Octavian Augustus)	Cos.Suff 43, Cos. II:33, III:31
539	Antonia 94	ANTONIVS AVGVR COS.DES.ITER.ET.TERT.IMP.TERTIO IIIVIR R.P.C.	36	36	M. Antonius M.f. M.n.	Cos. I:44, II:34, Cos. Desig. 31
540	Julia 138-139	IMP.CAESAR DIVI F III VIR ITER.R.P.C.COS.ITER.ET TER.DESIG	36	36	C. Julius C.f. C.n. Caesar (Octavian Augustus)	Cos.Suff 43, Cos. II:33, III:31
541	Antonia 91-92	M.ANTONI M.F.M.N.AVG.IMP.ITER.DESIGN.IIIVIR R.P.C.	34	34	M. Antonius M.f. M.n.	Cos. I:44, II:34, Cos. Desig. 31
542	Antonia 96-97	ANTON AVG.IMP.III COS.DES.III III V.R.P.C.	33	33	M. Antonius M.f. M.n.	Cos. I:44, II:34, Cos. Desig. 31
542	Junia 172	M.SILANUS AUG.Q.PRO.COS	33	33	M. Junius Silanus	Cos. 25
543	Antonia 95	ANTONI.ARMENIA.DEVICTA CLEOPATRAE.REGINAE.REGVM.FILIORVM.REGVM	32	32	M. Antonius M.f. M.n.	Cos. I:44, II:34, Cos. Desig. 31
544	Antonia 101-130, 132-138	ANT.AVG.IMP.IIIVIR R.P.C.	32	32	M. Antonius M.f. M.n.	Cos. I:44, II:34, Cos. Desig. 31
545	Antonia 146-147	M.ANTONIVS AVG.IMP.IIII.COS.TERT.IIIVIR R.P.C.	31	31	M. Antonius M.f. M.n.	Cos. I:44, II:34, Cos. Desig. 31
545	Turullia 5	D.TVR	31	31	D. Turullius	Q.44
546	Pinaria 9-14	SCARPVS IMP	31	31	L. Pinarius Scarpus	
546	Antonia 98-100	M.ANTO.COS.III IMP.III AVG	31	31	M. Antonius M.f. M.n.	Cos. I:44, II:34, Cos. Desig. 31
546	Julia 141-144	CAESARI DIVI F	31	31	C. Julius C.f. C.n. Caesar (Octavian Augustus)	Cos.Suff 43, Cos. II:33, III:31
547	N/A	[C]N.PISO.FRVGI	43	31	Cn. Calpurnius Piso Frugi	Cos.Suff.23
548	Quinctia 1	T.QVINCTI	196	196	T. Quinctius T.f. L.n. Flamininus	Cos.198
549	Cornelia 57	CN.LNTVL	59	59	Cn. Cornelius P.f. Lentulus Marcellinus	Cos. 56
550	Oppia 1-2	Q. OPPIVS PR	88	88	Q. Oppius	Pr. 89

== See also ==
- List of Roman consuls

== Bibliography ==
- Babelon, Ernest (1885-6). Description historique et chronologique des monnaies de la république romaine, 2 Volumes.
- Broughton, T. Robert S. (1951). The Magistrates of the Roman Republic, American Philological Association, 3 Volumes. Volume I (509 B.C. – 100 B.C.) ISBN 0-89130-812-1 . Volume II (99 B.C. – 31 B.C.) Philological Monographs Number XV, 1952. Volume III (Supplement) ISBN 0-89130-811-3.
- Burnett, Andrew (1977). "The Authority to Coin in the Late Republic and Early Empire", Numismatic Chronicle, Seventh Series 17 pp. 37–63.
- Burnett, Andrew (1987). Coinage in the Roman World, Seaby. ISBN 0-900652-85-3
- Crawford, Michael H. (1974). Roman Republican Coinage, Cambridge University Press, 2 Volumes. ISBN 0-521-07492-4
- Hamilton, Charles D. (1969),The Tresviri Monetales and the Republican Cursus Honorum, Transactions and Proceedings of the American Philological Association, 100 pp 181–199.
- Harlan, Michael (1996). Roman Republican Moneyers and their Coins 63 BC – 49 BC, Trafalgar Square Publishing. ISBN 0-7134-7672-9 {
- Hornblower, Simon & Spaworth, Antony (1999). The Oxford Classical Dictionary. Third Edition. ISBN 0-19-866172-X
- Melville Jones, John R., (1990), A Dictionary of Ancient Roman Coins, Seaby. ISBN 1-85264-026-X
- Luce, T.J. (1968). "Political Propaganda on Roman Republican Coins: Circa 92–82 B.C.", American Journal of Archaeology 72(1), pp. 25–39.
- Sear, David R. (1998). The History and Coinage of the Roman Imperators 49–27 B.C., Spink & Son. ISBN 0-907605-98-2
- Smith, William (1875). A Dictionary of Greek and Roman Antiquities, John Murray, London.
- Stevenson, Seth William (1889). A Dictionary of Roman Coins, Republican and Imperial, George Bell and Sons, London.
- Wiseman, T.P. (1971). New Men in the Roman Senate 139 B.C. – A.D. 14, Oxford University Press, ISBN 1-59740-224-9
