= Dictator perpetuo =

Office held by Julius Caesar

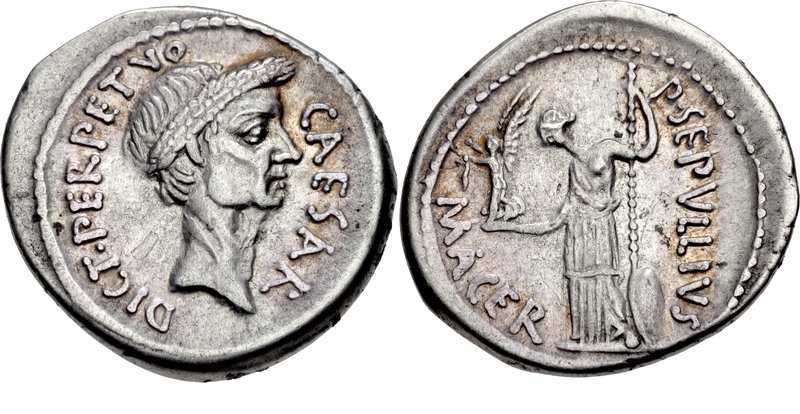
Denarius of moneyer P. Sepullius Macer with the head of Julius Caesar on the obverse. The legend on the obverse reads dict perpetvo caesar.

Dictator perpetuo (English: "dictator in perpetuity"), also called dictator in perpetuum, was the office Julius Caesar held at the end of his life. He was granted the title between 26 January and 15 February during the year 44 BC. By abandoning the time restrictions of the regular Roman dictatorship, it elevated Caesar to a rank more akin to the ancient Roman kings. This change, among other monarchical tendencies, motivated his assassination a few weeks later on 15 March 44 BC.

== History ==
Julius Caesar held the dictator position for only eleven days in 49 BCE (holding elections either as dictator Comit. habend. or as dictator rei gerundae causa) and again for the year 48/47 BCE. In 46 BCE, he was elected dictator for the next ten years. At some point between January and February 44 BCE he was appointed dictator perpetuo, but was assassinated less than two months later, on the Ides of March.

Stefan Weinstock has argued that the perpetual dictatorship was part of the senatorial decrees regarding Caesar's divine honors, as well as his planned apotheosis as Divus Iulius, a complex of honors aimed at eternity and divinity.

== See also ==
- Dictator
- José Gaspar Rodríguez de Francia, styled Dictador Perpetuo of Paraguay from 1814 to 1840
- President for life
- Roman emperor
