= Sepullius Bassus =

1st century Roman orator

Sepullius Bassus was a rhetorician and orator of ancient Rome who lived around the end of the 1st century BCE and 1st century CE. He was frequently mentioned by the Seneca the Elder in his Controversiae. Seneca does not convey a high estimation of his abilities as a declaimer.

He may be related to the 1st-century BCE moneyer Publius Sepullius Macer.
