= Sepullia gens =

Ancient Roman family

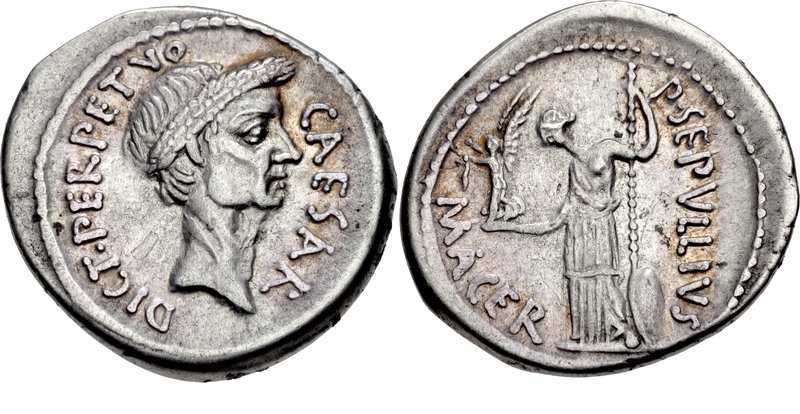
Denarius of Publius Sepullius Macer, 44 BC, with the head of Julius Caesar on the obverse and Venus on the reverse. The legend on the obverse refers to Caesar's title of Dictator perpetuo.

The gens Sepullia was a minor plebeian family of ancient Rome. Hardly any members of this gens are mentioned in ancient writers, of whom the most famous was Sepullius Bassus, a rhetorician known to Seneca the Elder.

== Origin ==
The nomen Sepullius belongs to a class of gentilicia apparently formed from cognomina ending in the diminutive suffix -ulus. In this case, the nomen would have derived from Sepulus or a similar name, presumably a diminutive of the old Latin praenomen Septimus, originally given to a seventh son or seventh child, or Seppius, its Oscan equivalent. Sepullius would thus be derived from the same root as the more common Septimius.

The Sepullii were perhaps from Patavium in Venetia and Histria, as several of the inscriptions bearing this name are from that area.

== Members ==
This list includes abbreviated praenomina. For an explanation of this practice, see filiation.

- Marcus Sepullius, one of the municipal officials at Pompeii in Campania in 46 BC.
- Publius Sepullius Macer, a moneyer in 44 BC, the year of Caesar's assassination, depicted the great comet of that year upon his coins, along with the wreathed head of Caesar, and the goddess Venus, from whom the Julii claimed descent.
- Sepullius Bassus, an orator and contemporary of Seneca the Elder.
- Gaius Sepullius C. l. Abdaeus, a freedman buried at Rome in the late first century BC, or early first century AD.

=== Undated Sepulii ===
- Sepullius, dedicated a monument in memory of Timetus at Interamna Lirenas in southern Latium.
- Publius Sepullius P. f., a maker of small pottery, whose maker's mark is found on pottery from Gallia Cisalpina, Narbonensis, and Patavium in Venetia and Histria.
- Quintus Sepullius, named in an inscription from Rome.
- Sepullia Ɔ. l. Fausta, a freedwoman, and wife of the tibicen Gaius Urveilius Pedo, with whom she was buried at Aquinum in Latium.
- Publius Sepullius P. l. Florens, a freedman buried at Patavium.
- Gaius Sepullius C. f. Maturus, buried at Patavium, along with Ettia Prima, perhaps his wife.
- Gaius Sepullius Onesimus, an officinator buried at Patavium.
- Gaius Sepullius C. f. Rufus, buried at Cyzicus in Asia, along with his wife, Caecinia Prima, aged forty-nine.
- Publius Sepullius P. f. Tacitus, buried at Patavium.

== See also ==
- List of Roman gentes

== Bibliography ==
- Lucius Annaeus Seneca (Seneca the Elder), Controversiae.
- Joseph Hilarius Eckhel, Doctrina Numorum Veterum (The Study of Ancient Coins, 1792–1798).
- Dictionary of Greek and Roman Biography and Mythology, William Smith, ed., Little, Brown and Company, Boston (1849).
- Theodor Mommsen et alii, Corpus Inscriptionum Latinarum (The Body of Latin Inscriptions, abbreviated CIL), Berlin-Brandenburgische Akademie der Wissenschaften (1853–present).
- René Cagnat et alii, L'Année épigraphique (The Year in Epigraphy, abbreviated AE), Presses Universitaires de France (1888–present).
- George Davis Chase, "The Origin of Roman Praenomina", in Harvard Studies in Classical Philology, vol. VIII, pp. 103–184 (1897).
- Paul von Rohden, Elimar Klebs, & Hermann Dessau, Prosopographia Imperii Romani (The Prosopography of the Roman Empire, abbreviated PIR), Berlin (1898).
- Kenneth Scott, "The Sidus Iulium and the Apotheosis of Caesar", in Classical Philology, vol. 36, No. 3, pp. 257–272 (July 1941).
- T. P. Wiseman, "Some Republican Senators and Their Tribes", The Classical Quarterly, Vol. 14, No. 1 (May, 1964), pp. 122–133.
- Michael Crawford, Roman Republican Coinage, Cambridge University Press, 1974, ISBN 9780521074926.
- Robert A. Gurval, "Caesar's Comet: the Politics and Poetics of an Augustan Myth", in Memoirs of the American Academy in Rome, vol. 42, pp. 39–71 (1997).
