= Gnaeus Lucretius =

Gnaeus Lucretius Trio was a Roman moneyer, who minted denarii in Rome c. 136 BC. He may be an ancestor of Lucius Lucretius Trio.

One of his denarii shows a head of Roma facing right with "TRIO" behind and an "X" below the chin. The reverse shows the Dioscuri galloping right with "CN. LVCR" below the horses and "ROMA" in the exergue. It is cataloged in "Roman Silver Coins" as "Lucretia 1" and in "Roman Republican Coinage" as "237/1".

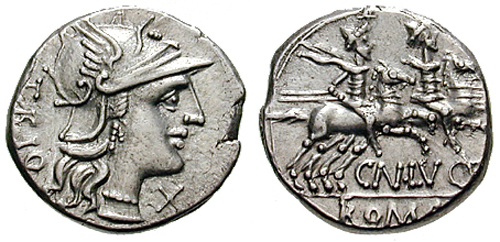
Lucretia 1: Roma / Dioscuri

== See also ==
- Lucretia gens
