= Marcus Mettius =

Marcus Mettius or Metius (fl. mid-1st century BC) was a supporter of Julius Caesar in the 50s and 40s BC.

== Diplomatic envoy ==
During the first year of the Gallic Wars, Caesar sent Mettius and the Helvian Celt Gaius Valerius Troucillus as envoys to the Suebian king Ariovistus, in what was presented as a last-ditch effort to prevent a full-scale war. Instead, Ariovistus accused the two of spying and arrested them. Troucillus was chained and subjected to at least psychological torture, but Mettius seems to have received better treatment, perhaps because he had a longstanding relationship (hospitium) with the Suebian. The abuse of envoys was a violation of the ius gentium, the customary law of international relations, but it has been observed that Ariovistus's charge may not have been groundless.

Since Ariovistus had been declared a Friend of the Roman People (amicus populi romani) during Caesar's consulship in 59 BC, the hospitium between him and Mettius might have had to do with the diplomacy that led to the declaration of friendship. Mettius is sometimes identified as a businessman, presumably of the equestrian order; trade with the Germanic peoples at the time might have involved slaves, animals, or goods. Caesar says only that he chose Mettius for the mission because of his ties to Ariovistus, and provides no further information about the man's social rank, ethnicity, or occupation.

== Monetalis ==
In 44 BC, Mettius was a moneyer (monetalis), one of four men (IIIIviri) minting both in his own name and in Caesar's. His fellow moneyers were L. Aemilius Buca, P. Sepulius Macer, and C. Cossutius Maridianus.

Coins from this period with iconography of Juno Sospita bear the name of M. Mettius. The reverse of one coin features Sospita in a biga (two-horse chariot) holding a shield and spear and wearing her distinctive goat-horned headdress. On another, the obverse depicts Sospita and a coiled snake, with an image of Victory in a biga on the reverse. A third type shows a girl and snake facing each other.

The cult of Juno Sospita was based in Lanuvium, in Latium. T.P. Wiseman, however, noted that Mettii are found in Liguria and the ethnically Celtic upper Po Valley, and speculated whether Mettius had "adopted a Lanuvine coin type to divert attention from his real origin?"
