= Lex Plaetoria =

Roman law introduced by someone named Plaetorius

In Roman law, a Lex Plaetoria is a law (lex) introduced by someone with the family name Plaetorius.

== Lex Plaetoria de iurisdictione ==
The Lex Plaetoria de iurisdictione (after 242 BC, but before 200 BC) was introduced as a plebiscite (plebiscitum) by the tribune M. Plaetorius. The law is significant in the history of the praetorship, but the textual difficulties of the passage in which it is most fully described leave room for varying interpretation. The law required the urban praetor to make himself available to administer justice for the people (populus), probably in the Comitium, all day, until dusk. It is assumed to have redefined the duties of the praetor as established by the Twelve Tables, perhaps because of the recent creation of the praetor peregrinus. It specifies that the praeter urbanus administered justice inter cives, "among citizens," in contrast to the praetor inter peregrinos, among foreigners. This assumption dates the Lex Plaetoria to 242 BC or after, but the dating is problematic because the Plaetorii are not known to have been prominent in public life until after 200. The law also provided the urban praetor with two lictors while he was exercising his jurisdiction.

== Lex Plaetoria de minoribus ==
The Lex Plaetoria de minoribus (192–191 BC) protected legal minors. If someone under age 25 entered into a legal transaction contrary to his own interests, it authorized a praetor to grant a restitutio in integrum, a legal remedy for a person who had suffered an unjust loss because of an overly strict application of law. The legal position of both parties was restored to their standing before the contested litigation, but as a matter of civil law (ius civile), the transaction itself was not reversed.

== Lex Plaetoria on altars ==
A Lex Plaetoria (mid-2nd century BC) is known from two inscriptions commemorating the refurbishing of altars by an Aulus Postumius Albinus, identified as a duovir and possibly the consul of 180 BC (censor 173 BC). The law seems to have been passed specifically to authorize Postumius Albinus to undertake these two projects, and was not necessarily aimed at legislating religious dedications in general, though religious revivalism was characteristic of the period as a response to the Second Punic War.
