= Lucretia gens =

Ancient Roman family

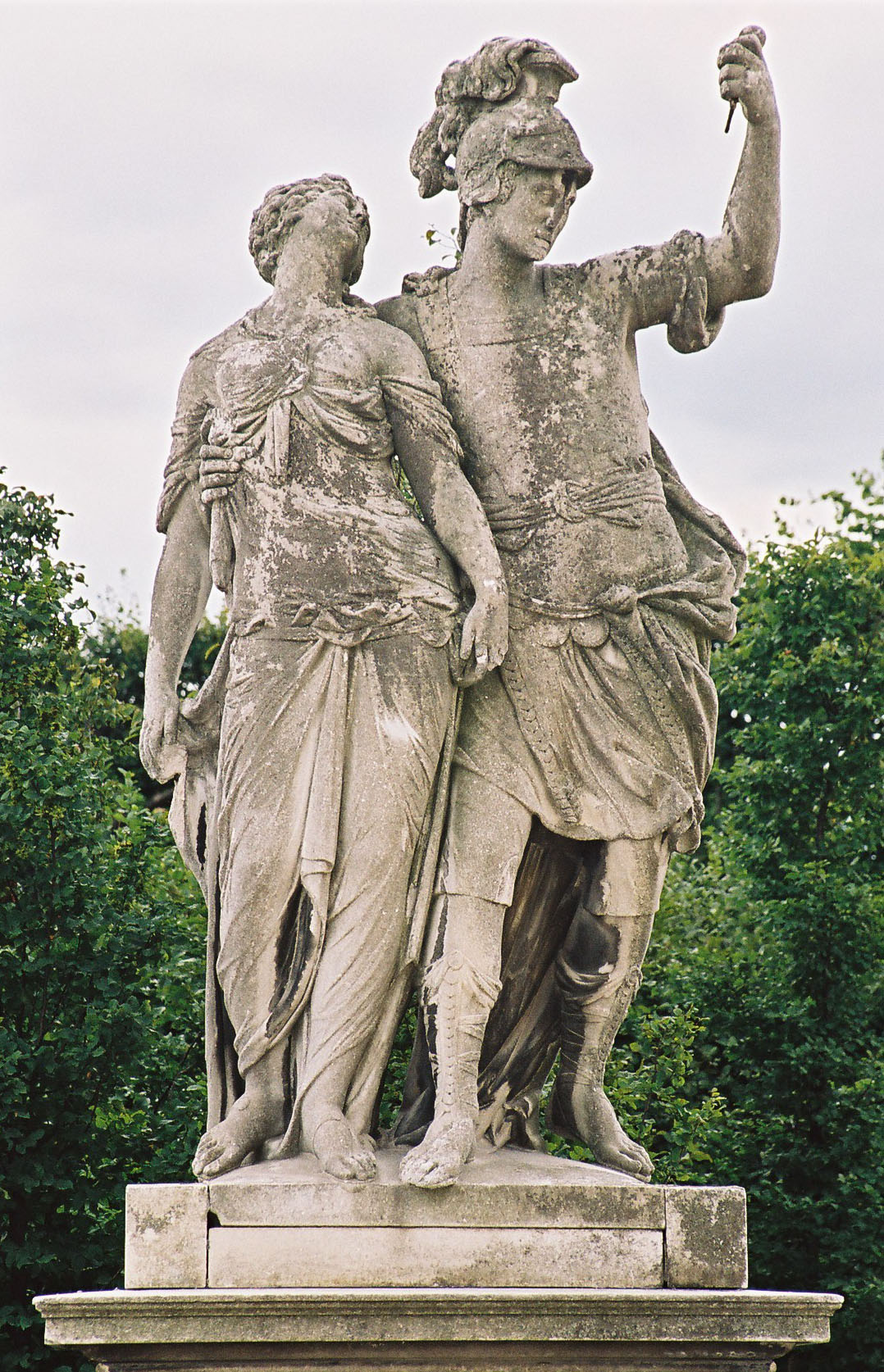
Lucius Junius Brutus supporting the body of Lucretia Statue at Schönbrunn Palace, Vienna

The gens Lucretia was a prominent family of the Roman Republic. Originally patrician, the gens later included a number of plebeian families. The first of the Lucretii to obtain the consulship was Spurius Lucretius Tricipitinus in 509 BC, the first year of the Republic.

== Origins ==
Believed to be of Etruscan origin, however the Lucretii were one of the most ancient gentes, and the second wife of Numa Pompilius, the second King of Rome, was named Lucretia.

== Praenomina ==
The patrician Lucretii favored the praenomina Titus, Spurius, Lucius, and Publius. They were one of the only gentes known to have used the name Hostus, and may also have used Opiter, which was favored by the Verginii.

The main praenomina used by the plebeian Lucretii were Lucius, Marcus, Spurius, and Quintus. There are also examples of Gaius, Gnaeus, and Titus.

== Branches and cognomina ==
The only patrician family of the Lucretii bore the cognomen Tricipitinus. The plebeian families are known by the surnames Gallus, Ofella, and Vespillo. Gallus was a common name referring either to a Gaul, or a cockerel. Vespillo, an occupational surname referring to one who removes corpses, was bestowed on one of this family who had thrown the body of Tiberius Gracchus into the river. Carus, "dear", was a surname belonging to the poet Lucretius. On coins, the cognomen Trio is found, but it is not mentioned in any ancient writer. A few of the Lucretii are mentioned without any surname.

== Members ==
This list includes abbreviated praenomina. For an explanation of this practice, see filiation.

- Lucretia, according to some accounts, the wife of Numa Pompilius, the second King of Rome. They were supposed to have married after Numa's accession to the throne.
- Publius Lucretius, according to Livy, consul in 506 BC; here Livy's manuscript appears to be corrupt, and list two sets of consuls; Lucretius is probably an error either for Spurius Larcius, apparently consul in this year, or Titus Lucretius, consul in 508 and 504, in both years the colleague of Publius Valerius Poplicola, whom the manuscript makes the colleague of the otherwise unknown Publius Lucretius.
- Lucius Lucretius, quaestor in 218 BC, at the commencement of the Second Punic War; he was taken prisoner by the Ligures, along with some other Roman officers, and delivered up to Hannibal.
- Marcus Lucretius, tribune of the plebs in 210 BC, took a leading part in the dispute over the appointment of a dictator in that year.
- Spurius Lucretius, praetor in 205 BC, during the Second Punic War, received Ariminum, subsequently called Gallia Cisalpina, as his province. In 203 he rebuilt the city of Genua, which had been destroyed by Mago.
- Marcus Lucretius, tribune of the plebs in 172 BC, brought forward a bill ut agrum Campanum censores fruendum locarent. In the following year, he served as legate to his brother, Gaius Lucretius Gallus, in Greece.
- Gaius Lucretius Gallus, praetor in 171 BC, received the command of the fleet in the war against Perseus. In the following year he was accused of great cruelty, and condemned to pay a heavy fine.
- Spurius Lucretius, praetor in 172 BC, obtained the province of Hispania Ulterior. In 169 he served with distinction under the consul Quintus Marcius Philippus in the war against Perseus. He was one of three ambassadors sent into Syria in 162.
- Gnaeus Lucretius Trio, triumvir monetalis circa 136 BC.
- Quintus Lucretius Afella, a partisan of Sulla, he commanded the army that accepted the surrender of Praeneste in 82 BC. The following year, he made himself a candidate for consul, in violation of Sulla's law de magistratibus, and was slain by one of Sulla's soldiers.
- Lucius Lucretius Trio, triumvir monetalis circa 76 BC.
- Marcus Lucretius, a senator, and one of the judices retained by Verres, in consequence of which he was suspected of having been bribed.
- Titus Lucretius Carus, a celebrated poet of the 1st century BC and writer of De rerum natura, "On the Nature of the Things".
- Quintus Lucretius, an intimate friend of Gaius Cassius Longinus, and a supporter of the aristocratic party. During the Civil War he was obliged to flee the town of Sulmo, when his own troops opened the gates to Marcus Antonius.
- Decimus Lucretius Valens, mentioned in a graffito from Pompeii.
- Lucius Lucretius Annianus, praefectus of Egypt circa 240.

=== Lucretii Tricipitini ===
- Titus Lucretius Tricipitinus, father of the consuls of 509 and 508 BC.
- Spurius Lucretius T. f. Tricipitinus, a member of the Roman Senate, and possibly praefectus urbi under Lucius Tarquinius Superbus, the seventh and last King of Rome. Following the expulsion of the Tarquins, he was elected consul suffectus in the place of Lucius Tarquinius Collatinus, who had resigned, but he died shortly after taking office.
- Lucretia S. f. T. n., married Lucius Tarquinius Collatinus, one of the first consuls in 509 BC; her rape by Sextus Tarquinius set in motion the events that culminated in the downfall of the Roman monarchy and the establishment of the Republic.
- Titus Lucretius T. f. Tricipitinus, consul in 508 and 504 BC; in the former year, he fought against Lars Porsena, the king of Clusium, and was wounded in the battle. In 504 he and his colleague successfully carried on the war against the Sabines.
- Lucius Lucretius T. f. T. n. Tricipitinus, consul in 462 BC, triumphed over the Volsci; the following year he defended Caeso Quinctius Cincinnatus, son of the dictator Cincinnatus, who was condemned and exiled. In 449 he was one of the senators who spoke in favor of abolishing the decemvirate.
- Hostus Lucretius L. f. T. n. Tricipitinus, consul in 429 BC; according to Diodorus, his praenomen was Opiter.
- Publius Lucretius Hosti f. L. n. Tricipitinus, tribunus militum consulari potestate in 419 and 417 BC.
- Lucius Lucretius Tricipitinus Flavus, consul in 393 BC, and tribunus militum consulari potestate in 391, 388, 383, and 381; as consul he conquered the Aequi. According to Plutarch, he was usually the first senator allowed to speak, which in later times was the privilege of the princeps senatus, although the appointment of that name probably did not exist in the time of Lucretius.

=== Lucretii Vespillones ===
- Lucretius Vespillo, aedile in 133 BC, he threw the corpse of Tiberius Gracchus into the Tiber, thereby obtaining his cognomen, which refers to a corpse-bearer for the poor.
- Quintus Lucretius Vespillo, an orator and jurist, who was proscribed by Sulla and put to death.
- Quintus Lucretius Q. f. Vespillo, served in the fleet of Gnaeus Pompeius in 48 BC, during the Civil War; he was proscribed by the triumvirs in 43 BC, but concealed in his own house by his wife, Thuria, until he was pardoned. He was appointed consul suffectus in 19 BC.

== See also ==
- List of Roman gentes
