= Titus Eppius Latinus =

2nd century Roman politician

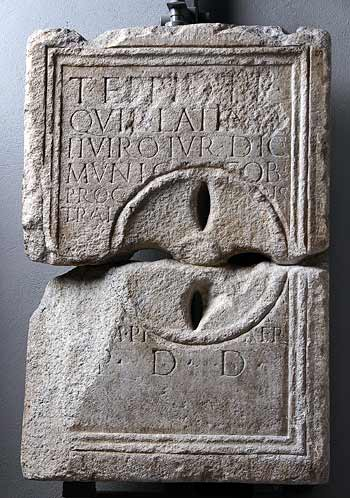
- Inscription in honor of Latinus
- Born: Neviodunum (modern-day Drnovo)
- Citizenship: Roman
- Era: Rule of Emperor Trajan
- Title: duumvir iure dicundo municipii Latobicorum procurator ad census accipiendos procurator familiarum gladiatoriarum provinciarum Hispaniarum trium procurator IIII publicorum Africae
- Father: Titus
- Family: gens Eppia

Titus Eppius Latinus (fl. during the reign of Trajan) was the first known Pannonian Roman member of the ordo equester.

== Origin ==
Latinus was born in Neviodunum (officially municipium Flavium Latobicorum, modern-day Drnovo) in the province of Pannonia. He was in the Quirina tribe and his father was called Titus. There are multiple theories on his ethnic origin. He may have come from a Northern Italic family moving from Aquileia—or a Dalmatian. Inscriptions set up by southern Gauls in the vicinity of his birthplace suggest that his ancestors lived in Southern Gaul. Another possibility is that—like the majority of provincial equites—he was a member of the local aristocracy that gained citizenship.

His nomen gentilicum could've been the Latinized version of the native Pannonian Epo or Eppo name present around Emona (modern-day Ljubljana) and Neviodunum, however, Eppius was very rare in Pannonia. It was also rare but present in Northern Italy, including Aquileia, and much more common in Southern Gaul. In Noricum it appears as Eppaeus. On the other, his cognomen was widespread in Northern Italy and Noricum. It asserts that he was of Roman origin but that may suggest he actually wasn't.

== Service ==
Unlike most equites, Latinus didn't start as a military officer. Before getting admitted into the ordo equester, he was duumvir of Neviodunum. Afterwards, he occupied multiple procurator posts under Trajan. He was procurator ad census accipiendos of a province with the job of carrying out a census, then procurator familiarum gladiatoriarum provinciarum Hispaniarum trium charged with administrating the companies that recruit gladiators from Hispania. Added up, these positions paid him 60,000 sestertii yearly. Later, Latinus worked as procurator IIII publicorum Africae overseeing the finances of Africa.

== Sources ==
- Agócs, Nándor (2017). 'Dignitas, Auctoritas, Maiestas és Potestas' Pannoniában ['Dignitas, Auctorias, Maiestas and Potestas' in Pannonia] (PDF). Pécs: L'Harmattan. ISBN 9789634145745.
- Sólyom, Márk (2021). "Ki kicsoda az ókori Pannonia elitjében? Agócs Nándor: Dignitas, Auctoritas, Maiestas és Potestas Pannoniában. A politikai, vallási és gazdasági hatalom ismert pannoniai származású és helyi birtokosai Pannonia térségében Augustustól Iustinianus koráig" [Who's who in the elite of ancient Pannonia? Nándor Agócs: Dignitas, Auctoritas, Maiestas and Potestas in Pannonia. The known Pannonian and local holders of political, religious and economic power in the region of Pannonia from Augustus to the age of Justinian] (PDF). Polymatheia. 18 (3–4). doi:10.51455/Polymatheia.2021.3-4.15. S2CID 244567454.
- Agócs, Nándor (2014). Pannoniaiak a Principatus kori Birodalomban [Pannonians in the Empire at the age of the Principate]. Pécs.
- Mócsy, András (2014). Pannonia and Upper Moesia (Routledge Revivals): A History of the Middle Danube Provinces of the Roman Empire. Routledge. ISBN 9781317754244.
- Szabó, Edit (2003). A pannoniai városok igazgatása. Urbanizáció, önkormányzat és városi elit a Kr. u. 1–3. században a feliratok tükrében [Management of the Pannonian cities. Urbanization, self-governance and urban elite in the 1–3rd centuries AD from the inscriptions' perspective]. Debrecen.
- Abascal, Juan Manuel (2011). "Eppius Latinus, Titus". Diccionario biográfico español [Spanish biographical dictionary]. Spain: Real Academia de la Historia.
