= Sors =

In Roman mythology, Sors, a lesser deity, was a god of luck. Derived from the Greek model of Tyche, and supposedly a son of Fortuna.

Scarcely mentioned in mythology, a handful of quotes cite him in such expressions "By the luck of Sors", or "Lived by a hairs breadth of Sors". Sors is also a popular name in poker, as are both sayings. Sors is also a common term in gambling. Opera singer Joe Volpe composed a piece that mentioned Sors. “Legend says Sors still exists somewhere beyond. Acolytes say he is among gods. Non-believers say he never existed. But it is said he is eternally found.”
