= Eppia gens =

The gens Eppia was a minor plebeian family at Ancient Rome. It is known chiefly as a result of Marcus Eppius, a Roman senator, and partisan of Pompeius during the Civil War. He served as legate under Quintus Metellus Scipio, and later under Sextus Pompeius.

== Members ==
This list includes abbreviated praenomina. For an explanation of this practice, see filiation.

- Marcus Eppius M. f., a Roman senator, who served on the side of Pompeius during the Civil War, beginning in 49 BC. In the African War, he was a legates under Quintus Caecilius Metellus Pius Scipio, and was one of those whom Caesar pardoned following the Battle of Thapsus. In 46 and 45, he served under Sextus Pompeius in Spain.
- Titus Eppius T. f. Latinus, the first known Pannonian member of the equestrian order, was commemorated by an inscription from Neviodunum in Pannonia Superior, indicating that he had been procurator in various provinces during the reign of Trajan, and that he was one of the duumviri of a colony established amongst the Latobici.

== See also ==
- List of Roman gentes

== Bibliography ==
- Marcus Tullius Cicero, Epistulae ad Atticum; Epistulae ad Familiares.
- Gaius Julius Caesar (attributed), De Bello Africo (On the African War).
- Joseph Hilarius Eckhel, Doctrina Numorum Veterum (The Study of Ancient Coins, 1792–1798).
- Dictionary of Greek and Roman Biography and Mythology, William Smith, ed., Little, Brown and Company, Boston (1849).
- Theodor Mommsen et alii, Corpus Inscriptionum Latinarum (The Body of Latin Inscriptions, abbreviated CIL), Berlin-Brandenburgische Akademie der Wissenschaften (1853–present).
