= Lucius Lucretius =

Lucius Lucretius Trio was a Roman moneyer, who minted two denarii in c. 76 BCE.

His coin showing the laureate head of Neptune is in the collections of the Museum of Fine Arts, Boston.

The other has a radiate Sol (Sun) on the obverse and a crescent moon and seven stars on the reverse. The stars are the Septem Triones (Ursa Major), a pun of the moneyer cognomen.

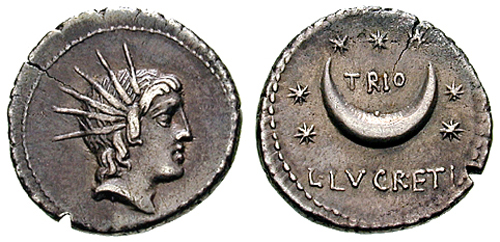
Lucretia 2: Sol / crescent moon and seven stars

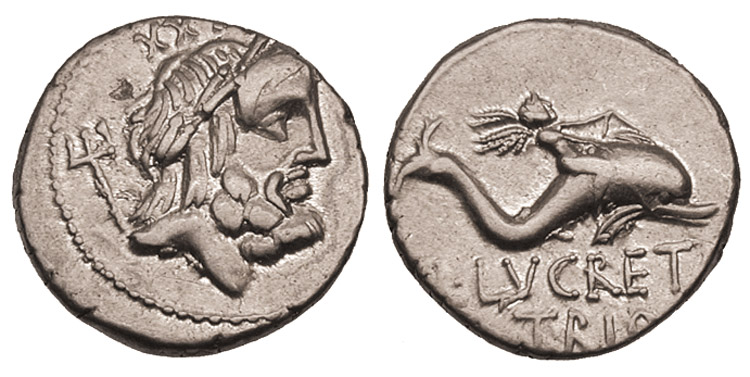
Lucretia 3: Neptune / Winged boy on dolphin

== See also ==
- Lucretia gens
