= Moneyer =

Private individual officially permitted to mint money

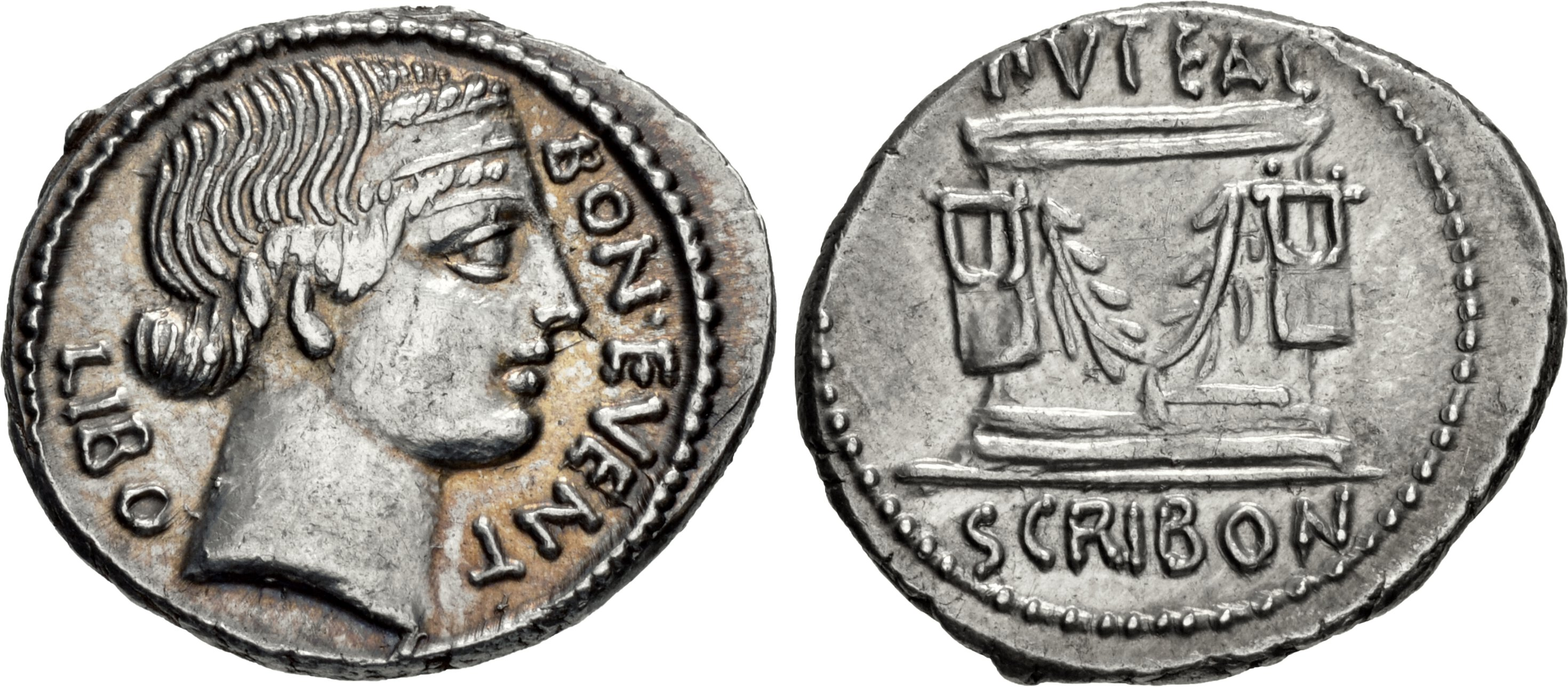
Denarius of Republican moneyer Lucius Scribonius Libo struck in 62 BC

A moneyer is a private individual who is officially permitted to mint money. Usually the rights to coin money are bestowed as a concession by a state or government. Moneyers have a long tradition, dating back at least to ancient Greece. They became most prominent in the Roman Republic, and continued into the Empire. In Rome the position of Triumvir Monetalis, held by three people at a time, was a minor magistracy awarded by the Senate, often the first office held by young politicians, including Marcus Aurelius.

Moneyers were not limited to the ancient world. During the Middle Ages, European moneyers created currency on behalf of kings and potentates. For a large part of that era, virtually all coins in circulation were silver pennies, and these often bore the name or other identification of the moneyer. In 17th century North America, John Hull acted as a moneyer for the Massachusetts Bay Colony.

== See also ==
- Roman currency
  - List of Roman moneyers during the Republic
- Roman Republic
- Roman Republican coinage
- Vigintisexviri
