= 90s BC =

Decade

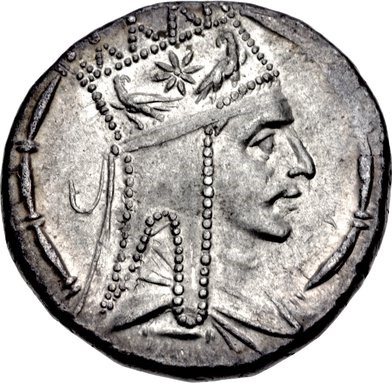
Tigranes the Great becomes King of Armenia in 94 BC.

90s BC is the time period from 99 BC – 90 BC.

== Events ==
=== 99 BC ===
==== By place ====
====== Roman Republic ======
- Consuls: Aulus Postumius Albinus and Marcus Antonius.

====== Asia ======
- Han-Xiongnu War

- The Han general Li Guangli marches west from Jiuquan with 30,000 cavalrymen to attack the Tuqi King of the Right in the Tian Shan Mountains. After an initial victory, the Han are surrounded, and they lose more than 20,000 men while breaking out of the encirclement.
- The Han generals Lu Bode and Gongsun Ao march into the Zhuoxie Mountains, but they encounter no Xiongnu forces and turn back.
- Autumn – The Han general Li Ling leads 5000 crack infantry and a cavalry force from Juyan Lake into the eastern Altay Mountains but is pursued by Qiedihou Chanyu. After a desperate fighting retreat across more than 500km of Xiongnu territory, the Han expedition runs out of arrows. Li Ling surrenders and his force disintegrates in the Tihan Mountains, about 50km from the Great Wall of China.
- Emperor Wu of Han has the 'Grand Historian' Sima Qian castrated after the latter argues in defense of Li Ling's surrender.

=== 98 BC ===
==== By place ====
====== Roman Republic ======
- Consuls: Quintus Caecilius Metellus Nepos and Titus Didius.
- The Senate passes the Lex Caecilia Didia, which bans omnibus bills.

====== Asia ======
- Emperor Wu of Han sends the Han general Gongsun Ao on a mission to rescue general Li Ling from Xiongnu captivity. Gongsun achieves little but receives incorrect information that Li has been training Xiongnu soldiers. Enraged, Emperor Wu exterminates Li's clan.

=== 97 BC ===
==== By place ====
====== Roman Republic ======
- Consuls: Gnaeus Cornelius Lentulus and Publius Licinius Crassus.
- C. Decianus, the prosecutor of Furius, is himself condemned for his remarks about the death of Saturninus.
- The Romans subdue the Maedi and Dardani.
- L. Domitius takes harsh measures to restore order in Sicily.
- The censors, Flaccus and Antonius, remove M. Duronius from the senate because of his opposition to sumptuary laws.
- A decree of the Roman Senate bans human sacrifices.
- Sulla displays a lion hunt for the first time in games at Rome.

====== Asia Minor ======
- Ariarathes VIII is forced out of Cappadocia by Mithridates, and dies soon afterwards.

====== China ======
- The Han generals Li Guangli, Gongsun Ao, Han Yue and Lu Bode lead armies into Xiongnu territory. The campaign achieves little, and Gongsun Ao suffers a defeat. Emperor Wu of Han condemns him to death due to his troops suffering heavy losses, but he escapes by feigning his death. He is eventually discovered and executed during the witchcraft trials of 91 BC.

====== Japan ======
- Sujin becomes emperor of Japan (approximate date).

=== 96 BC ===
==== By place ====
====== Roman Republic ======
- Consuls: Gaius Cassius Longinus and Gnaeus Domitius Ahenobarbus
- Cyrene is left to the people of the Roman Republic by its ruler Ptolemy Apion.

====== Greece ======
- Seleucus VI Epiphanes becomes king of the Seleucid Empire following the death of his father Antiochus VIII Grypus, and defeating in battle Antiochus IX Cyzicenus.

====== Asia ======
- Start of the Taishi era in the Han dynasty.

=== 95 BC ===
==== By place ====
====== Rome ======
- Consuls: Lucius Licinius Crassus and Quintus Mucius Scaevola Pontifex

====== Seleucid kingdom ======
- Philip I Philadelphus and Antiochus XI Ephiphanes succeeded as co-rulers after the deposition of Seleucus VI Epiphanes.

====== Ireland ======
- "Forty-metre structure" at Emain Macha (near modern Armagh, Northern Ireland) was built and destroyed, presumably for ritual or ceremonial purposes.

====== Asia Minor ======
- Tigranes the Great becomes king of Armenia

=== 94 BC ===
==== By place ====
====== Anatolia ======
- Approximate date – Nicomedes IV succeeds his father Nicomedes III as king of Bithynia.

====== India ======
- The Shakas start to control northwest India.

====== Roman Republic ======
- Consuls: Gaius Coelius Caldus and Lucius Domitius Ahenobarbus.
- The first (failed) attempt to open a Latin rhetorical school.
- Lucius Cornelius Sulla is elected praetor urbanus.

=== 93 BC ===
==== By place ====
====== Roman republic ======
- Roman consuls: Gaius Valerius Flaccus and Marcus Herennius.

====== Asia Minor ======
- Ariobarzanes I Philoromaios becomes king of Cappadocia with Roman backing.
- Arshak I becomes king of Caucasian Iberia after overthrowing Farnadjom.

====== East Asia ======
- End of era Taishi of Emperor Wu of Han China.

=== 92 BC ===
==== By place ====
====== Roman Republic ======
- Consuls: Gaius Claudius Pulcher and Marcus Perperna.
- In the first diplomatic contact between Rome and Parthia, Sulla meets with a Parthian envoy, resulting in the parties recognizing the Euphrates as a common frontier.
- Sulla repulses Tigranes of Armenia from Cappadocia.
- Gaius Sentius becomes Roman governor of Macedonia. He serves until 88 BC.

=== 91 BC ===
==== By place ====
====== Roman Republic ======
- Consuls: Sextus Julius Caesar and Lucius Marcius Philippus.
- The tribune Marcus Livius Drusus proposes extending Roman citizenship to allied Italian cities, but is assassinated, leading to the Social War.

====== China ======
- Witchcraft Trials

- Emperor Wu of Han executes Prime Minister Gongsun He (the brother-in-law of Empress Wei Zifu) and his clan because Gongsun's son is accused of adultery with the emperor's daughter Princess Yangshi and witchcraft.
- Following further accusations of witchcraft, the emperor executes hundreds of imperial officials and concubines.
- After convincing the emperor that his ill health is caused by witchcraft, the prosecutor Jiang Chong is given charge of investigating the matter. People accuse each other of witchcraft, and tens of thousands are executed across China, including former generals Zhao Ponu and Gongsun Ao.

- 'Rebellion' of Liu Ju

- July - After Jiang Chong frames Crown Prince Liu Ju of witchcraft and prevents communication between the prince and his father, Liu Ju kills Jiang, former general Han Yue and their followers. Due to miscommunication, the emperor misinterprets this as a rebellion against himself, and he orders Prime Minister Liu Qumao to march against Liu Ju.
- After being defeated in Chang'an, Liu Ju and his mother, Empress Wei Zifu, commit suicide. Emperor Wu exterminates the followers of Liu Ju and their families.
- Learning that the charges against Liu Ju were fabricated, Emperor Wu orders further executions.

- September - The Xiongnu invade the prefectures of Shanggu and Wuyuan.

=== 90 BC ===
==== By place ====
====== Roman Republic ======
- Consuls: Lucius Julius Caesar and Publius Rutilius Lupus.
- Social War continues: Pompeius Strabo and Gaius Marius distinguish themselves.
- The Etruscans are granted Roman citizenship.
- Corfinium in south-central Italy is the center of a rebellion against Rome.
- The Lex Iulia grants citizenship to all Italians who did not oppose Rome during the Social War.
- Cicero starts to serve in the Roman army.

====== Asia Minor ======
- Nicomedes IV of Bithynia is defeated in battle by a coalition of Nicomedes' brother Socrates, and Mithridates VI of Pontus. Nicomedes flees to Rome.

====== China ======
- The Xiongnu invade the Prefectures of Wuyuan and Jiuquan and kill the commandants of both Prefectures.
- Emperor Wu of Han sends three armies against the Xiongnu under General-in-Chief Li Guangli, Ma Tong and Shang Qiucheng, marching from Wuyuan, Jiuqian and Xihe respectively. An army of Central Asian vassals of Han, under Cheng Mian, captures the king of the vassal state of Jushi, who is suspected of treachery. The Xiongnu General-in-Chief and the former Han general Li Ling fight indecisively against Shang's army.
- Li Guangli and his in-law Prime Minister Liu Qumao seek to recommend Liu Bo, Li Guangli's nephew, as the new Crown Prince, and while Li Guangli is on campaign, Liu Qumao and his wife are executed and Li Guangli's wife imprisoned, having been charged with cursing the emperor and seeking to replace him with Liu Bo.
- Wishing to please the emperor, Li Guangli and his 70,000 men penetrate as far as the Selenga River. A detachment crosses the river and defeats an army of 20,000 under the Xiongnu Left General-in-Chief, who is killed. However, Li Guangli is then defeated by Hulugu Chanyu's army of 50,000 in the Khangai Mountains and surrenders. Li Guangli marries Hulugu's daughter, and Emperor Wu exterminates Li's clan.

== Births ==
99 BC

- Lucretius, Latin prominent philosopher and poet (d. c. 55 BC)

98 BC

- Nigidius Figulus, Roman philosopher (probable date) (d. 45 BC)
- Terentia, first wife of Cicero (d. AD 4).

97 BC

- Appius Claudius Pulcher, Roman consul (d. 49 BC)

96 BC

- Galeria Copiola, Roman dancer d. 9 AD

95 BC

- Clodia, daughter of Appius Claudius Pulcher
- Marcus Porcius Cato Uticensis, Roman politician (d. 46 BC)

94 BC

- Zhao of Han, Chinese emperor (d. 74 BC)

93 BC

- Publius Clodius Pulcher, Roman politician (d. 52 BC)

91 BC

- Xuan of Han, emperor of the Han dynasty (d. 49 BC)

90 BC

- Aulus Hirtius, Roman politician and historian (d. 43 BC)
- Diodorus Siculus, Greek historian (approximate date)
- Pasherienptah III, Egyptian high priest (d. 41 BC)

== Deaths ==
98 BC

- Emperor Kaika of Japan, according to legend.

96 BC

- Antiochus VIII Grypus, king of the Seleucid Empire
- Antiochus IX Cyzicenus, king of the Seleucid Empire
- Gongsun Ao, Chinese general of the Han dynasty
- Ptolemy Apion, king of Cyrenaica (modern Libya)

93 BC

- Antiochus XI, king of the Seleucid Empire
- Farnadjom, king of Caucasian Iberia

92 BC

- Antiochus XI Epiphanes, king of the Greek Seleucid Empire, drowned

91 BC

- Liu Ju, crown prince of the Han dynasty (b. 128 BC)
- Lucius Licinius Crassus, Roman consul (b. 140 BC)
- Marcus Livius Drusus, Roman politician
- Quintus Caecilius Metellus Numidicus, Roman politician
- Wei Zifu, empress of the Han dynasty

90 BC

- Antiochus X Eusebes, Seleucid king (approximate date)
- Dionysios Trax, Greek grammarian (b. 170 BC)
- Li Yannian, Chinese musician (executed by Wu of Han)
- Pharnajom, king of Iberia (modern Georgia)
