= De Oratore, Book III =

Third part of De Oratore by Cicero

De Oratore, Book III is the third part of De Oratore by Cicero. It describes the death of Lucius Licinius Crassus.

== Overview ==
The characters belong to the generation, which precedes the one of Cicero. The main characters of the dialogue are Marcus Antonius (not the triumvir) and Lucius Licinius Crassus (not the person who killed Julius Caesar); other friends of them, such as Gaius Iulius Caesar (not the dictator), Sulpicius and Scaevola intervene occasionally.

At the beginning of the third book, which contains Crassus' exposition, Cicero is hit by a sad memory. He expresses all his pain to his brother Quintus Cicero. He reminds him that only nine days after the dialogue, described in this work, Crassus died suddenly. He came back to Rome the last day of the ludi scaenici (19 September 91 BC), very worried by the speech of the consul Lucius Marcius Philippus. He made a speech before the people, claiming the creation of a new council in place of the Roman Senate, with which he could not govern the State any longer. Crassus went to the curia (the palace of the Senate) and heard the speech of Drusus, reporting Lucius Marcius Philippus' speech and attacking him.

In that occasion, everyone agreed that Crassus, the best orator of all, overcame himself with his eloquence. He blamed the situation and the abandonment of the Senate: the consul, who should be his good father and faithful defender, was depriving it of its dignity like a robber. No need of surprise, indeed, if he wanted to deprive the State of the Senate, after having ruined the first one with his disastrous projects.

Philippus was a vigorous, eloquent and smart man: when he was attacked by the Crassus' firing words, he counter-attacked him until he made him keep silent. But Crassus replied:" You, who destroyed the authority of the Senate before the Roman people, do you really think to intimidate me? If you want to keep me silent, you have to cut my tongue. And even if you do it, my spirit of freedom will hold tight your arrogance".

Crassus' speech lasted a long time and he spent all of his spirit, his mind and his forces. Crassus' resolution was approved by the Senate, stating that "not the authority nor the loyalty of the Senate ever abandoned the Roman State". When he was speaking, he had a pain in his side and, after he came home, he got fever and died of pleurisy in six days.

How insecure is the destiny of a man!, Cicero says. Just in the peak of his public career, Crassus reached the top of the authority, but also destroyed all his expectations and plans for the future by his death.

This sad episode caused pain, not only to Crassus' family, but also to all the honest citizens. Cicero adds that, in his opinion, the immortal gods gave Crassus his death as a gift, to preserve him from seeing the calamities that would befall the State a short time later. Indeed, he has not seen Italy burning by the social war (91-87 BC), neither the people's hate against the Senate, the escape and return of Gaius Marius, the following revenges, killings and violence.

== Style ==
=== Words and content ===
Cicero's discourse on style in Book III begins with Crassus attempting to unify the distinction between words and content. The conversation is in response to a distinction Antonius made: that he would be the one to discuss what an orator must say, and leave to Crassus the discussion on how the orator should say it. Crassus claims that these things cannot be separated because removing the content from the words or vice versa would result in a failure to communicate, which is the goal of language.

Crassus then goes on to assert his belief that the universe as a whole is bound together by single, natural force. He paraphrases an idea of Plato's that says about the same: that all the disciplines of the world share an underlying bond. Crassus then suggests that eloquence is an inter-disciplinary unifying force. He draws a metaphor of eloquence being similar to a river, in that the water spreads out in many directions, all from the same source, and all containing the same qualities regardless of where the river may be. His point is that a style of words cannot be crafted without a content of thoughts, nor can it exist the other way around.

=== Preliminaries to style: the variety of eloquence ===
Crassus begins this section by discussing the arts. He claims that the value in art isn't derived from absolute quality, rather from the difference of a particular artist in respect to his colleagues. He talks about the skill of oratory and comes to a similar conclusion when using Catulus as an example. He claims that what makes Catulus great is his uniqueness. If his style were to have anything added or subtracted from it, it would become worse. He then gives Caesar, Sulpicius, and Cotta the same treatment, with the effect being that Crassus acknowledges the importance of individual style.

He goes on to say that it is up to the instructor of oratory to teach his pupils according to their natural talent. He cites Isocrates as an effective teacher who didn't try to produce one style of oratory, rather, “added to the one and filed away from the other only as much as was necessary to reinforce in each what his natural abilities allowed.” The point of setting up his discourse on style in such a manner, is to defend his suggestions as being geared toward the style of oratory that Crassus prefers.

=== Introduction of the four qualities of style ===
Crassus outlines that there are four qualities to style: correct Latin, clarity, distinction, and appropriateness. The first two, he claims, are elementary aspects and that “learning them is easy, using them is indispensable.”

=== The first two qualities of style: correct Latin and clarity ===
A large part of speaking correct Latin is, for Crassus, dependent on pronunciation. He chooses to make a point that this is separate from delivery, which occurs later in the book, and is actually an integral aspect of language. He uses Lucius Cotta as an example of someone with an affected accent, while he suggests that Catulus’ is more natural, due in part that he is from Rome. The Roman accent is one that has “nothing unpleasant, nothing to provoke criticism, and nothing to sound or smell of foreignness.” On clarity, Crassus’ advice revolves around the idea of simplicity, and of not trying to obscure the truth through unnecessary complexities: i.e. ambiguity, excessive length, and confusion of order.

== Critical editions ==
- De Oratore in Cicero Rhetorica. Vol. I (De Oratore) Edited by Augustus Samuel Wilkins Clarendon Press Oxford Classical Texts 264 pages | 238x167mm ISBN 978-0-19-814615-5 | Hardback | 26 March 1963
- M TULLI CICERONIS SCRIPTA QUAE MANSERUNT OMNIA FASC. 3 DE ORATORE edidit KAZIMIERZ F. KUMANIECKIed. TEUBNER; Stuttgart and Leipzig, anastatic reprinted 1995 ISBN 3-8154-1171-8
- L'Orateur - Du meilleur genre d'orateurs. Collection des universités de France Série latine. Latin text with translation in French. ISBN 2-251-01080-7 ISBN 978-2-251-01080-9 Publication Year: June 2008
- M. Tulli Ciceronis De Oratore Libri Tres, with Introduction and Notes by A. S. Wilkins. Oxford: Oxford University Press, 1902. (Reprint: 1961). Available from the Internet Archive here.

== Editions with a commentary ==
- De oratore libri III / M. Tullius Cicero; Kommentar von Anton D. Leeman, Harm Pinkster. Heidelberg : Winter, 1981-<1996 > Description: v. <1-2, 3 pt.2, 4 >; ISBN 3-533-04082-8 (Bd. 3 : kart.) ISBN 3-533-04083-6 (Bd. 3 : Ln.) ISBN 3-533-03023-7 (Bd. 1) ISBN 3-533-03022-9 (Bd. 1 : Ln.) ISBN 3-8253-0403-5 (Bd. 4) ISBN 3-533-03517-4 (Bd. 2 : kart.) ISBN 3-533-03518-2 (Bd. 2 : Ln.)
- "De Oratore Libri Tres", in M. Tulli Ciceronis Rhetorica (ed. A. S. Wilkins), Vol. I. Oxford: Oxford University Press, 1892. (Reprint: Amsterdam: Adolf M. Hakkert, 1962). Available from the Internet Archive here.

== Translations ==
- Cicero, M.T. (May, J.M. & Wisse, J. trans.), Cicero on the Ideal Orator (De Oratore), Oxford University Press, (Oxford), 2001. ISBN 0-19-509197-3

== Sources ==
The summary of the dialogue is based on De oratore, Marcus Tullius Cicero, edited by Kazimierz Kumaniecki, 1969, Coll. Teubner, revised Walter de Gruyter, 1995, ISBN 3-8154-1171-8, ISBN 978-3-8154-1171-1 (De Oratore in Google Books)
