= 94 BC =

94 BC in various calendars
- Gregorian calendar: 94 BC; XCIV BC
- Ab urbe condita: 660
- Ancient Egypt era: XXXIII dynasty, 230
- Pharaoh: Ptolemy X Alexander, 14
- Ancient Greek Olympiad (summer): 171st Olympiad, year 3
- Assyrian calendar: 4657
- Balinese saka calendar: N/A
- Bengali calendar: −687 – −686
- Berber calendar: 857
- Buddhist calendar: 451
- Burmese calendar: −731
- Byzantine calendar: 5415–5416
- Chinese calendar: 丙戌年 (Fire Dog); 2604 or 2397 — to — 丁亥年 (Fire Pig); 2605 or 2398
- Coptic calendar: −377 – −376
- Discordian calendar: 1073
- Ethiopian calendar: −101 – −100
- Hebrew calendar: 3667–3668
- Hindu calendars
- Vikram Samvat: −37 – −36
- Shaka Samvat: N/A
- Kali Yuga: 3007–3008
- Holocene calendar: 9907
- Iranian calendar: 715 BP – 714 BP
- Islamic calendar: 737 BH – 736 BH
- Javanese calendar: N/A
- Julian calendar: N/A
- Korean calendar: 2240
- Minguo calendar: 2005 before ROC 民前2005年
- Nanakshahi calendar: −1561
- Seleucid era: 218/219 AG
- Thai solar calendar: 449–450
- Tibetan calendar: མེ་ཕོ་ཁྱི་ལོ་ (male Fire-Dog); 33 or −348 or −1120 — to — མེ་མོ་ཕག་ལོ་ (female Fire-Boar); 34 or −347 or −1119

Year 94 BC was a year of the pre-Julian Roman calendar. At the time it was known as the Year of the Consulship of Caldus and Ahenobarbus (or, less frequently, year 660 Ab urbe condita) and the Third Year of Taishi.

== Events ==
=== By place ===
==== Anatolia ====
- Approximate date – Nicomedes IV succeeds his father Nicomedes III as king of Bithynia.

==== India ====
- The Shakas start to control northwest India.

==== Roman Republic ====
- Consuls: Gaius Coelius Caldus and Lucius Domitius Ahenobarbus.
- The first (failed) attempt to open a Latin rhetorical school.
- Lucius Cornelius Sulla is elected Praetor urbanus.

== Births ==
- Zhao of Han, Chinese emperor (d. 74 BC)
