= Lucius Crassus =

Lucius Crassus may refer to:

- Lucius Licinius Crassus ancient Roman orator
- Lucius Crassus, pen name of Alexander Hamilton (1755-1804) American statesman
