= Gnaeus =

Gnaeus, also spelled Cnaeus, was a Roman praenomen derived from the Latin naevus, a birthmark. It was a common name borne by many individuals throughout Roman history, including:

== Individuals ==
- Gnaeus Acerronius Proculus, a consul of the Roman Empire in 37 AD
- Gnaeus Arrius Antoninus (born 31 AD), member of the Arrius family of consular rank
- Gnaeus Aufidius Orestes (died 1st-century BC), Roman politician who was elected consul in 71 BC
- Gnaeus Calpurnius Piso (disambiguation)
- Gnaeus Claudius Severus (consul 167), a Roman senator and philosopher who lived in the Roman Empire during the 2nd century
- Gnaeus Cornelius Cinna Magnus (1st-century BC–1st-century AD), son of suffect consul Lucius Cornelius Cinna
- Gnaeus Cornelius Dolabella, a consul of the Roman Republic in 81 BC, with Marcus Tullius Decula
- Gnaeus Cornelius Scipio Asina, a Roman politician involved in the First Punic War
- Gnaeus Cornelius Scipio Calvus (3rd-century–211 BC), Roman general and statesman
- Gnaeus Domitius Afer (died 59), a Roman orator and advocate
- Gnaeus Domitius Ahenobarbus (consul 32 BC) (died 31 BC), general of the 1st century BC
- Gnaeus Domitius Ahenobarbus (consul 32) (17 BC–40 AD), relative of emperors of the 1st century AD
- Gnaeus Domitius Ahenobarbus (disambiguation), other individuals belonging to the Domitii Ahenobarbi
- Gnaeus Domitius Corbulo (7–67 AD), general of the 1st century AD
- Gnaeus Egnatius (fl. second century BC), builder of Via Egnatia
- Gnaeus Gellius (2nd century BC), the author of a history of Rome from the earliest epoch
- Gnaeus Julius Agricola (40–93 AD), Gallo-Roman general responsible for much of the Roman conquest of Britain
- Gnaeus Julius Verus, Roman general and senator of the mid-2nd century AD, eventually becoming governor of Britain
- Gnaeus Lucretius, a Roman moneyer who minted denarii in Rome c. 136 BCE
- Gnaeus Mallius Maximus, a Roman politician and general, consul in 105 BC
- Gnaeus Manlius, a Roman Praetor who was involved in the Third Servile War with Gnaeus Tremellius Scrofa
- Gnaeus Manlius Cincinnatus (died 5th-century BC), first of the patrician gens Manlia to obtain the consulship
- Gnaeus Manlius Vulso (consul 189 BC), a Roman consul for the year 189 BC, together with Marcus Fulvius Nobilior
- Gnaeus Marcius Coriolanus (fl. 5th century BC), Roman general
- Gnaeus Naevius (264–201 BC), Roman epic poet and dramatist of the Old Latin period
- Gnaeus Octavius (consul 87 BC) (died 87 BC), Roman senator elected consul of the Roman Republic in 87 BC alongside Lucius Cornelius Cinna
- Gnaeus Papirius Aelianus, a governor of Roman Britain between 145 and 147
- Gnaeus Papirius Carbo (c. 130–82 BC), three-time consul of ancient Rome
- Gnaeus Pompeius (son of Pompey the Great) (75–45 BC), Roman politician and general from the late Republic (1st century BC)
- Gnaeus Pompeius Longinus (died AD 105), Legate of the Judaea in the time of Domitian.
- Gnaeus Pompeius Magnus, or Pompey the Great, (106–48 BC), military and political leader of the late Roman Republic, consul three times
- Gnaeus Pompeius Strabo (135 BC - 87 BC), Roman senator, promagistrate in Sicily, and consul
- Gnaeus Pompeius Trogus, 1st-century BC Roman historian of the Celtic tribe of the Vocontii in Gallia Narbonensis
- Gnaeus Sentius Saturninus, the name of two Roman senators, father and son
- Gnaeus Servilius Caepio (consul 203 BC), a Roman statesman who served as Roman consul in 203 BC
- Gnaeus Servilius Geminus (3rd-century–216 BC), Roman consul during the Second Punic War

== See also ==
- Gnaeus (praenomen)
- Cn (disambiguation)
