= Lucius Domitius Ahenobarbus =

Lucius Domitius Ahenobarbus may refer to:

- Lucius Domitius Ahenobarbus (consul 94 BC)
- Lucius Domitius Ahenobarbus (consul 54 BC)
- Lucius Domitius Ahenobarbus (consul 16 BC)
- Lucius Domitius Ahenobarbus, the birth name of the Roman emperor Nero

== See also ==
- Ahenobarbus (disambiguation)
