= Perpernia gens =

Ancient Roman family

The gens Perpernia, also found as Perpennia, was a plebeian family of Etruscan descent at ancient Rome. Members of this gens first appear in history during the second century BC, and Marcus Perperna obtained the consulship in 130 BC.

== Origin ==
The Perpernae were certainly of Etruscan origin, as indicated by the form of their nomen; gentilicia ending in -enna, -erna, -inna, and similar forms are characteristic of Etruscan families, and are not found among the other peoples of Italy. Both Perperna and Perpenna are found in the best manuscripts, and no coins of this gens have survived, although Fronto mentions some that existed in his time. The Fasti Capitolini give the name as Perperna, which seems to be preferred in modern scholarship. "Perpernia" or "Perpennia" was the feminine form.

It is uncertain precisely when and under what circumstances the Perpernae arrived at Rome. Although there was a Roman ambassador of this name in 168 BC, Valerius Maximus relates a curious and perhaps confused account, in which the father of Marcus Perperna, consul in 130 BC, was condemned after his son's death, for having unlawfully assumed the character of a Roman citizen. It seems strange that the father of a Roman consul would not himself have been a citizen, or have obtained the franchise during his son's lifetime. Adding to the confusion, Valerius Maximus refers to his punishment under the lex Papia, which expelled non-citizens from Rome, and punished those who had wrongfully assumed the franchise; but this law is generally supposed to have been passed by Gaius Papius, tribune of the plebs in 65 BC. Broughton suggests that Valerius Maximus has confused the law with the lex Junia de Peregrinis of 126 BC, but this does not resolve the uncertainty regarding the consul's father. Broughton identifies the consul's father as the Marcus Perperna who was legate in 168 BC, and concludes that Valerius Maximus was incorrect.

== Praenomina ==
Marcus was the chief praenomen of the Perpernae who occur in history, although this family also made use of Lucius and Gaius. These were the three most common praenomina throughout Roman history. In inscriptions, we also find Aulus, Sextus, and Titus.

== Branches and cognomina ==
All of the Perpernae who are mentioned by the ancient historians appear to have belonged to a single family, and only one of them bore a cognomen. Marcus Perperna, the betrayer of Sertorius, bore the surname Veiento. Other Perpernae are known from inscriptions.

== Members ==
This list includes abbreviated praenomina. For an explanation of this practice, see filiation.

- Lucius Perperna, grandfather of the consul of 130 BC.
- Marcus Perperna (L. f.), one of two ambassadors imprisoned by the Illyrian king Gentius in 168 BC. Following the king's surrender to the Roman praetor, Lucius Anicius Gallus, later that year, Perperna was released and sent to bring the news of the king's defeat to Rome.
- Marcus Perperna L. f., father of the consul of 130 BC, said to have been condemned under the lex Papia after his son's death, for illegally assuming the Roman franchise, but both the accuracy of the account and the law in question are doubtful, and he should probably be identified with the legate of 168 BC.
- Marcus Perperna M. f. L. n., as praetor in 135 BC, fought against the slaves who had revolted in Sicily, and was honoured with an ovation. Consul in 130, he defeated and captured Aristonicus of Pergamum, but he died before he could return to Rome.
- Marcus Perperna M. f. M. n., consul in 92 BC, and censor in 86. He is probably the same Perperna mentioned as a judex by Cicero. Perperna was famous for his longevity, and died at the age of ninety-eight, having survived nearly all of those he had appointed to the senate during his censorship.
- Gaius Perperna (M. f. M. n.), praetor by 91 BC, in 90 he served as one of the legates under the consul Publius Rutilius Lupus during the Social War. He was defeated, and Rutilius relieved him of his command, giving his army to Marius.
- Marcus Perperna M. f. M. n. Veiento, praetor in 82 BC, was a partisan of Marius, who after the death of Sulla joined in the rebellion of the proconsul Marcus Aemilius Lepidus. After the latter's defeat and death, Perperna and his army joined forces with Sertorius in Spain. In 72 BC, Perperna and his allies assassinated Sertorius and took control of his army, but were utterly defeated by Pompeius, and Perperna was put to death.
- Gaius Perperna Veiento.
- Perpenna Romanus, consular governor of Sicily in the 4th century AD.
- Petronius Perpenna Magnus Quadratianus, praefectus urbi of Rome in the fifth century AD. He repaired the Baths of Constantine.

== See also ==
- List of Roman gentes

== Bibliography ==
- Marcus Tullius Cicero, De Oratore, In Verrem, Pro Quinto Roscio Comoedo.
- Gaius Sallustius Crispus (Sallust), Historiae (The Histories).
- Cornelius Nepos, De Viris Illustribus (On the Lives of Famous Men).
- Titus Livius (Livy), History of Rome.
- Marcus Velleius Paterculus, Compendium of Roman History.
- Quintus Asconius Pedianus, Commentarius in Oratio Ciceronis Pro Scauro (Commentary on Cicero's Oration Pro Scauro).
- Gaius Plinius Secundus (Pliny the Elder), Naturalis Historia (Natural History).
- Publius Cornelius Tacitus, Annales.
- Plutarchus, Lives of the Noble Greeks and Romans.
- Lucius Annaeus Florus, Epitome de T. Livio Bellorum Omnium Annorum DCC (Epitome of Livy: All the Wars of Seven Hundred Years).
- Marcus Junianus Justinus Frontinus (Justin), Epitome de Cn. Pompeio Trogo Historiarum Philippicarum et Totius Mundi Originum et Terrae Situs (Epitome of Trogus' Philippic History and Origin of the Whole World and all of its Lands).
- Appianus Alexandrinus (Appian), Macedonica (The Macedonian Wars), Bellum Civile (The Civil War).
- Cassius Dio, Roman History.
- Eutropius, Breviarium Historiae Romanae (Abridgement of the History of Rome).
- Paulus Orosius, Historiarum Adversum Paganos (History Against the Pagans).
- Dictionary of Greek and Roman Biography and Mythology, William Smith, ed., Little, Brown and Company, Boston (1849).
- George Davis Chase, "The Origin of Roman Praenomina", in Harvard Studies in Classical Philology, vol. VIII (1897).
- T. Robert S. Broughton, The Magistrates of the Roman Republic, American Philological Association (1952).
