= CN =

CN, Cn, cn and other variants may refer to:

== Companies ==
- Canadian National Railway, reporting mark CN
- China Netcom, a former telecommunication service provider in China, NYSE symbol
- Collegiate Network, supporting college publications
- Grand China Air, IATA code CN
- Islands Nationair, an airline based in Port Moresby, Papua New Guinea, IATA code CN
- Westward Airways (Nebraska), a former airline, IATA code CN (dissolved 2005)

== Media and entertainment ==
- Cartoon Network, an American cable channel
  - List of international Cartoon Network channels
  - The Cartoon Network, Inc., an American entertainment company which operates the channel
- CN23 (Cultura y Noticias 23), a defunct Argentine news channel

== Places ==
- Canada, which has ISO 3166 country code "CA" but is sometimes abbreviated "CN" by American organizations to disambiguate from California
- China (People's Republic of China), ISO 3166 country code CN
- CN Centre, an arena in Prince George, British Columbia
- CN Tower, communications and observation tower in Toronto, Ontario
- Station code for Cirebon railway station
- Circuito Norte, national highway of Cuba

== Mathematics, science, and technology ==
=== Biology ===
- Computational neuroethology, the study of animal behavior and its control by the nervous system
- Cranial nerves, CN 0 to CN XII

=== Chemistry ===
- CN gas, a substituted acetophenone used as a riot control agent
- Copernicium, symbol Cn, a chemical element
- Cyanide, any chemical compound that contains a carbon atom triple-bonded to a nitrogen atom, -CN
  - Cyano radical, molecular formula ·CN
- Cyanogen, a colorless, toxic gas with a pungent odor, (CN)_{2}

=== Computing ===
- .cn, country code top-level domain for mainland China
- Cloud native computing, an approach in software development
- Common Name, an attribute of the Lightweight Directory Access Protocol protocol family
- Common Name, an attribute of X.509 public-key certificates
- VIA CN, a 64-bit CPU for personal computers

=== Mathematics ===
- C_{n}, a cyclic group
- C_{n}, a classical root system
- cn (elliptic function), one of Jacobi's elliptic functions

=== Other uses in mathematics, science, and technology ===
- Carrier-to-noise ratio C/N, the signal-to-noise ratio of a modulated signal
- Curve number, a parameter used in hydrology for predicting direct runoff or infiltration from rainfall
- cN, abbreviation for centinewton, a force equal to one hundredth of a newton
- Classical nova, a type of cataclysmic variable star

== Other uses ==
- Cn (digraph), a digraph used in English for a few words of Greek origin
- Cnaeus (disambiguation) or Gnaeus (disambiguation), popular Roman praenomens
- Combined Nomenclature, EU customs coding
- Vehicle registration code for County Cavan, Ireland
- Vehicle registration code for Province of Cuneo, Italy
- Aircraft registration code for Morocco
- Group CN, a category of prototype racing cars
- Citation needed, a template on Wikipedia

== See also ==
- CNN, an American basic cable and satellite television channel
