= Gnaeus Domitius Ahenobarbus =

Gnaeus Domitius Ahenobarbus was the name of several Roman politicians:

- Gnaeus Domitius Ahenobarbus (consul 192 BC).
- Gnaeus Domitius Ahenobarbus (consul 162 BC), son of the previous.
- Gnaeus Domitius Ahenobarbus (consul 122 BC), son of the previous.
- Gnaeus Domitius Ahenobarbus (consul 96 BC), son of the previous.
- Gnaeus Domitius Ahenobarbus (died 81 BC), son of the previous.
- Gnaeus Domitius Ahenobarbus (praetor 54 BC), likely the son of Lucius Domitius Ahenobarbus (consul 94 BC).
- Gnaeus Domitius Ahenobarbus (consul 32 BC), grandson of the previous.
- Gnaeus Domitius Ahenobarbus (father of Nero), grandson of the previous.

== See also ==
- Ahenobarbus (disambiguation)
