= Quintus Antonius Balbus =

Ancient Roman politician

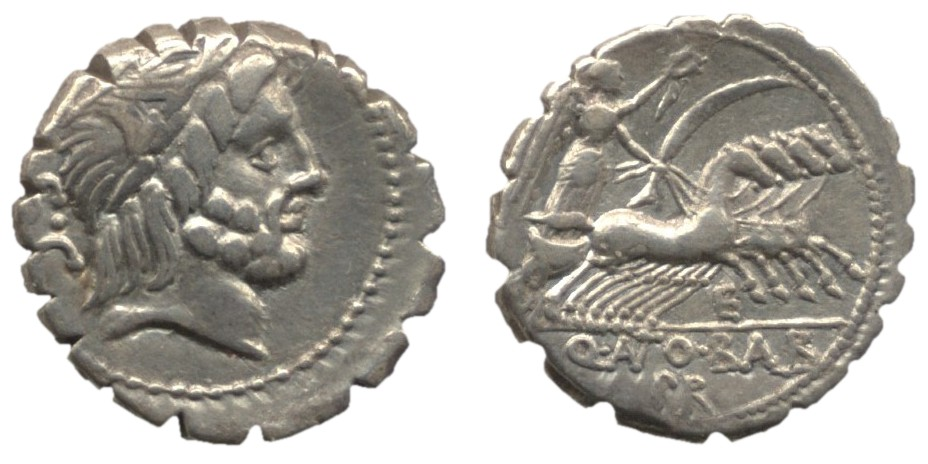
Silver denarius of Balbus.

Quintus Antonius Balbus was a Plebeian politician of Ancient Rome. He lived in the 1st century BCE.

Balbus was praetor in Sardinia in 82 BCE, during the civil war instigated by Roman Republican general Sulla. Balbus held that province on the side of the populares, but was killed by Lucius Marcius Philippus, legate of Sulla, who successfully conquered the province to bring it under Sulla's control.

Coinage survives that was struck either by, or in honor of, this Balbus. The obverse of the serrated silver denarius represents the head of the Roman god Jupiter; the reverse reads "Q. A(N)TO. BA(L)B. PR." with Victoria driving a quadriga.
