= Gaius Sempronius Tuditanus =

Roman politician and general

Gaius Sempronius Tuditanus was a politician and historian of the Roman Republic. He was consul in 129 BC.

== Biography ==
=== Early life ===
Gaius Sempronius Tuditanus was a member of the plebeian gens Sempronia. His father had the same name and was senator and in 146 BC member of a commission of ten men who had to reorganize the political conditions in Greece. The Roman orator and politician Cicero confused several times the younger Tuditanus with his father and was informed of his mistake by his friend Titus Pomponius Atticus in May 45 BC.

=== Career ===
Probably the younger Tuditanus is first attested in 146 BC as officer of Lucius Mummius Achaicus in his war in Greece. In 145 BC Tuditanus was Quaestor. Probably because he was an adherent of the Scipiones he could pass the curule offices within the legally allowed periods without any problems. In 132 BC he was Praetor.

Tuditanus achieved the peak of his career in 129 BC when he became consul together with Manius Aquillius. He had to govern the province of Italy and was ordered by a resolution of the senate to decide on the legitimacy of the accusations of dispossessed Roman allies whose estates had been annexed by the Gracchian commission for the allocation of fields. However, Tuditanus did not want to fulfill his task. Instead he went to Illyria, allegedly because of an imminent war. In this way he also prevented the allocation of additional fields.

According to Livy, "Consul Gaius Sempronius at first fought unsuccessfully against the Iapydians but the defeat was compensated by a victory won through the qualities of Decimus Junius Brutus Callaicus (the man who had subdued Lusitania)." However, according to Appian, "Sempronius Tuditanus and Tiberius Pandusa waged war with the Iapydes, who live among the Alps, and seem to have subjugated them." Tuditanus was granted a triumph. He immortalized his victories over the Iapydes with a dedication to the river god Timavus in Aquileia which bore a victory inscription in Saturnian verse and of which were found two fragments in 1906. Probably the Roman poet Hostius celebrated his deeds in the poem Bellum Histricum.

Pliny the Elder, in his geographical work, quoted an inscription on the statue of Tuditanus (whom he called the conqueror of the Istrians because the Iapydes lived in Istria) which listed the Roman towns in Istria, gave the river Arsa as the border with Italy and stated that the area was 400 kilometres wide.

== Personal life ==
He may have been the father of the Sempronia who married Decimus Junius Brutus, the son of Decimus Junius Brutus Callaicus.

== Works ==
Tuditanus was also an author but only a few fragments of his works have been preserved. Cicero emphasized his elegant style. In the internal Roman power struggles Tuditanus belonged to the Optimates and wrote a tendentious treatise on Roman constitutional law (libri magistratuum) in at least thirteen books for the political support of his party. On the other side Marcus Junius Congus Gracchanus was the author of a similar work, De potestatibus, at least seven books in length, that served the purposes of the party of the Gracchi. Both works were the earliest of their kind in the Roman literature. The libri magistratuum dealt with the intercalation, the appointment of the Plebeian Tribunes, the nundinae (market and feast days of the old Roman calendar), etc.

Because some quotations (e.g., about the original inhabitants of Latium called Aborigines, about the discovery of books, that allegedly belonged to the legendary Roman king Numa Pompilius, etc.) do not seem to fit into a work about constitutional law, some scholars attribute to Tuditanus another work dealing with the history of Rome from its foundation to the 2nd century BC.

It was probably the Roman universal scholar Marcus Terentius Varro who found out that Tuditanus used the annalists Cato the Elder and Lucius Cassius Hemina as sources for his works, as well as the fact that his account corresponded with that given by his contemporary Lucius Calpurnius Piso Frugi, but differed (because of the above-mentioned) from that by Junius Gracchanus. And it was again Varro who delivered the most preserved quotations of Tuditanus by later authors (Dionysius of Halicarnassus, Pliny the Elder, and Macrobius Ambrosius Theodosius). But two quotations by Aulus Gellius (Attic Nights 7.4.1 and 13.15.4) go back to the historian Quintus Aelius Tubero (whose son of the same name was consul in 11 BC) and the augur Messalla respectively.

== See also ==
- Sempronia gens

== Sources ==
- Friedrich Münzer: "Sempronius (92)". In: Realencyclopädie der Classischen Altertumswissenschaft, vol. IIA, 2 (1923), col. 1441–1443.
- H. Peter, Historicorum Romanorum Reliquiae (HRR) 1, p. 143-147.

Political offices
Preceded by Lucius Cornelius Lentulus; Marcus Perperna; Appius Claudius Pulcher	Roman consul 129 BC with Manius Aquillius	Succeeded by Gnaeus Octavius; Titus Annius Rufus
