= Manius Aquillius (consul 129 BC) =

2nd-century BC Roman senator

Manius Aquillius was a Roman senator who served as consul in 129 BC. He put an end to the war which had been carried on against Aristonicus, the son of Eumenes II, king of Pergamon, and which had been almost terminated by his predecessor, Marcus Perperna. On his return to Rome, he was accused by Publius Lentulus of maladministration in his province, Asia, but was acquitted by bribing the judges. He obtained a triumph on account of his successes in Asia, but not until 126 BC.

A fragment of a speech made by Gaius Gracchus - regarding the unseemly corruption in the Republic - exists in relation to charges made against Aquillius. After the kingdom of Pergamum was inherited by the Republic, Aquillius put up one of the fiefdoms of Pergamum (Phrygia) to the Kings of Bithynia and Pontus. It was purchased by the king of Pontus. As to the law regarding who was to receive the kingdom (Lex Aquillia) the senators were divisible, Gracchus claimed, into three camps: Those who were in favor of it, those who were against it, and those who were silent. Gracchus observes that the first group was bribed by the king of Pontus, the second by the King of Bithynia, and the third were the most cunning for they accepted money from both Kings and made each party believe they were silent in their interest.

== Notes ==
Political offices
Preceded by Marcus Perperna; Lucius Cornelius Lentulus	Roman consul 129 BC; With: Gaius Sempronius Tuditanus	Succeeded by Gnaeus Octavius; Titus Annius Rufus
