= Marcus Perperna (consul 130 BC) =

Roman general and senator

Marcus Perperna (c. 175 BC - 129 BC), Roman consul in 130 BC, is said to have been a consul before he was a citizen; for Valerius Maximus relates, that the father of this Perperna was condemned under the lex Papia after the death of his son, because he had falsely usurped the rights of a Roman citizen. Still, his father was later deemed innocent of all charges, and his citizenship was reinstated because he was one of the few clever enough to keep his family records. After all, they took advantage of a law that allowed colonists to reclaim Roman citizenship if they could prove it.

== Career ==
M. Perperna was praetor in 135 BC, in which year he had the conduct of the First Servile War in Sicily, and in consequence of the advantages he obtained over them, received the honour of an ovation on his return to Rome. With the support of Lucius Valerius Flaccus (the consul of 131 BC), who presided over his election, Perperna was elected to the consulship of 130 BC. His colleague was Lucius Cornelius Lentulus (and later consul suffectus Appius Claudius Pulcher).

As consul, he received the command in Anatolia against Aristonicus, who had defeated one of the consuls of the previous year, Publius Licinius Crassus Dives Mucianus. Perperna, however, soon brought the war to a close. He defeated Aristonicus in the first engagement and followed up his victory by laying siege to Stratonikeia, where Aristonicus had fled. The town was compelled by famine to surrender, and the king accordingly fell into the consul's hands. Perperna did not, however, live to enjoy the triumph, which he would undoubtedly have obtained, but died in the neighbourhood of Pergamum on his return to Rome in 129 BC. Perperna also granted the right of asylum to the temple of Diana in the town of Hierocaesareia in Lydia.

== Family ==
Perperna was the father of a homonymous son, Marcus Perperna, who was consul in 92 BC and censor in 86 BC. Gaius Perperna, the praetor of 92 BC, was likely another son.

Perperna appears to have forged a lasting alliance or affiliation with the Claudii Pulchri and the Valerii Flacci. Both this Perperna and his son shared consulships with Claudii Pulchri, a sign that they ran on a joint ticket. The son's colleague in the censorship was Lucius Marcius Philippus, whose mother was a Claudia Pulchra. The support of the Valerii Flacci was vital in both the election of this Perperna and his son.

== Notes ==
Preceded by Lucius Valerius Flaccus; Publius Licinius Crassus Dives Mucianus	Roman consul 130 BC with Lucius Cornelius Lentulus followed by Appius Claudius Pulcher	Succeeded by Gaius Sempronius Tuditanus; Manius Aquillius
