= Marcus Herennius (consul 93 BC) =

Marcus Herennius was consul of the Roman Republic in 93 BC. Although a plebeian and an indifferent orator, he defeated Lucius Marcius Philippus in the consular election for 93 BC. Pliny mentions the consulate of Herennius as remarkable for the quantity of Cyrenaic silphium -- Ferula tingitana -- then brought to Rome. This costly drug was worth a silver denarius per pound; and the mercantile connections of the Herennii in Africa may have caused this unusual supply.

Political offices
| Preceded by Gaius Coelius Caldus and Lucius Domitius Ahenobarbus | Consul of the Roman Republic with Gaius Valerius Flaccus; 93 BC | Succeeded by Gaius Claudius Pulcher and Marcus Perperna |
