= 74 BC =

74 BC in various calendars
- Gregorian calendar: 74 BC; LXXIV BC
- Ab urbe condita: 680
- Ancient Egypt era: XXXIII dynasty, 250
- Pharaoh: Ptolemy XII Auletes, 7
- Ancient Greek Olympiad (summer): 176th Olympiad, year 3
- Assyrian calendar: 4677
- Balinese saka calendar: N/A
- Bengali calendar: −667 – −666
- Berber calendar: 877
- Buddhist calendar: 471
- Burmese calendar: −711
- Byzantine calendar: 5435–5436
- Chinese calendar: 丙午年 (Fire Horse); 2624 or 2417 — to — 丁未年 (Fire Goat); 2625 or 2418
- Coptic calendar: −357 – −356
- Discordian calendar: 1093
- Ethiopian calendar: −81 – −80
- Hebrew calendar: 3687–3688
- Hindu calendars
- Vikram Samvat: −17 – −16
- Shaka Samvat: N/A
- Kali Yuga: 3027–3028
- Holocene calendar: 9927
- Iranian calendar: 695 BP – 694 BP
- Islamic calendar: 716 BH – 715 BH
- Javanese calendar: N/A
- Julian calendar: N/A
- Korean calendar: 2260
- Minguo calendar: 1985 before ROC 民前1985年
- Nanakshahi calendar: −1541
- Seleucid era: 238/239 AG
- Thai solar calendar: 469–470
- Tibetan calendar: མེ་ཕོ་རྟ་ལོ་ (male Fire-Horse); 53 or −328 or −1100 — to — མེ་མོ་ལུག་ལོ་ (female Fire-Sheep); 54 or −327 or −1099

Year 74 BC was a year of the pre-Julian Roman calendar. At the time it was known as the Year of the Consulship of Lucullus and Cotta (or, less frequently, year 680 Ab urbe condita). The denomination 74 BC for this year has been used since the early medieval period, when the Anno Domini calendar era became the prevalent method in Europe for naming years.

== Events ==
=== By place ===
==== Roman Republic ====
- Nicomedes IV, last king of Bithynia bequeaths his kingdom to the Roman Senate upon his death (75/4 BC)
- Third Mithridatic War: Battle of Cyzicus: Roman forces under Lucius Lucullus defeat the forces of Mithridates VI of Pontus.
- Marcus Antonius (father of Mark Antony), a praetor, receives wide-ranging powers and considerable resources to fight the pirates in the Mediterranean Sea.
- Publius Servilius Vatia returns to Rome, where he has triumphed against the pirates in Anatolia, and is given the agnomen Isauricus.
- Cyrene becomes a Roman province.

==== Spain ====
- Pamplona is founded.

== Deaths ==
- Lucius Aelius Stilo Praeconinus, Roman philologist
- Lucius Octavius, Roman politician and consul
- Nicomedes IV (Philopator), king of Bithynia
- Zhao of Han, Chinese emperor (b. 94 BC)
