= Islands Nationair =

Airline based in Port Moresby, Papua New Guinea

- Commenced operations: 1984
- Operating bases: Jacksons International Airport
- Fleet size: See Fleet below
- Headquarters: Port Moresby, Papua New Guinea

Islands Nationair is an airline based in Port Moresby, Papua New Guinea. It operates charter and scheduled passenger services and helicopter charter services. Its main base is Jacksons International Airport, Port Moresby. Its IATA Code is CN.

== History ==
The airline was established and started operations in 1984. Originally called Nationair, it was founded by Minson Peni and Nat Koleala, former pilots at Air Niugini. Due to internal conflicts, it was sold to Julius Chan, who renamed it Islands Nationair.

== Fleet ==
The Islands Nationair fleet consists of 1 Embraer EMB-110P1 Bandeirante aircraft (at January 2005).
