= Ahenobarbus =

Ahenobarbus (Latin, 'red-beard', literally 'bronze-beard'), also spelled Aenobarbus or Ænobarbus, may refer to:

- Gnaeus Domitius Ahenobarbus (disambiguation), Romans
- Lucius Domitius Ahenobarbus (disambiguation), Romans
- Lucius Domitius Ahenobarbus, birth name of Nero, Roman emperor 54–68
- Frederick Barbarossa, known in Latin as Fridericus Ænobarbus, Holy Roman Emperor 1155–1190
