= Marcus Perperna (consul 92 BC) =

Roman general and senator

Marcus Perperna (c. 147 BC – 49 BC) was consul in 92 BC.

== Family ==
Marcus Perperna was the homonymous son of Marcus Perperna. Gaius Perperna, the praetor of 92 BC, was likely his brother. The Perpernae were allied to the Valerii Flacci and the Claudii Pulchri. Perperna was likely the father of the Marian Marcus Perperna Veiento, who would assassinate Sertorius, and of Perpernia, who became a vestal virgin around 92 BC.

== Career ==
Marcus Perperna became consul in 92 BC with Gaius Claudius Pulcher, and censor in 86 BC with Lucius Marcius Philippus. The censorship of Perperna is mentioned by Cicero, and Cornelius Nepos speaks of him as censorius.

== Later life and death ==
Although he lived through troubled times, he did not play a prominent role in them. It was probably the same Marcus Perperna who was judex in the case of Gaius Aculeo, and also in that of Quintus Roscius, for whom Cicero pleaded. In 54 BC, Marcus Perperna is mentioned as one of the consulars who bore testimony on behalf of Marcus Aemilius Scaurus at his trial.

He lived past all these times reaching the age of ninety-eight when he finally died in 49 BC. He outlived all the senators who belonged to that body in his consulship, and at the time of his death there were only seven persons surviving whom he had enrolled in the senate during his censorship.

Political offices
Preceded by Gaius Valerius Flaccus and Marcus Herennius	Consul of the Roman Republic with Gaius Claudius Pulcher; 92 BC	Succeeded by Sextus Julius Caesar and Lucius Marcius Philippus
