= Gaius Claudius Pulcher (consul 92 BC) =

Gaius Claudius Pulcher was a Roman consul in 92 BC, together with Marcus Perperna.

== Biography ==
In 100 BC, he was one of those took up arms against Saturninus. In 99 BC, he was curule aedile, and in the games celebrated by him elephants were for the first time exhibited in the circus, and painting employed in the scenic decorations. In 95 BC, he was praetor in Sicily, and, by direction of the senate, gave laws to the Halesini respecting the appointment of their senate. The Mamertines made him their patronus. He was consul in 92 BC. Cicero speaks of him as a man possessed of great power and some ability as an orator.

== Children ==
Gaius was a member of the aristocratic and patrician gens Claudia. His great-grandfather was Gaius Claudius Pulcher in 177 BC.

He may have been the father of the Appius Claudius Pulcher (military tribune in the year 87 BC) and Marcus Livius Drusus Claudianus, who was adopted into the gens Livia by the reformer Marcus Livius Drusus. If he indeed is the father of Claudianus, he may have been married to a Livia, as adoption usually occurred between close relatives.

Political offices
Preceded by Gaius Valerius Flaccus and Marcus Herennius	Consul of the Roman Republic with Marcus Perperna; 92 BC	Succeeded by Sextus Julius Caesar and Lucius Marcius Philippus
