= Gaius Valerius Flaccus (consul 93 BC) =

Roman general and governor (1st century BC)

Consul of the Roman Republic
- In office January 93 BC – December 93 BC Serving with Marcus Herennius
- Preceded by: Gaius Coelius Caldus and Lucius Domitius Ahenobarbus
- Succeeded by: Gaius Claudius Pulcher and Marcus Perperna

Personal details
- Born: Unknown
- Died: Unknown

Military service
- Allegiance: Roman Republic
- Commands: Governor of Asia; Governor of Hispania Citerior; Governor of Hispania Ulterior; Governor of Gallia Cisalpina; Governor of Gallia Transalpina

Gaius Valerius Flaccus (fl. early 1st century BC) was a Roman general, politician and statesman. He was consul of the Roman Republic in 93 BC and a provincial governor in the late-90s and throughout the 80s. He is notable for his balanced stance during the Sullan civil wars, the longevity of his term as governor, and his efforts to extend citizenship to non-Romans.

He followed a normal course of magisterial roles in his younger years, culminating in his consulship, the highest civil rank in republican Rome. In 92 he was appointed governor of one or both of the Roman provinces in Hispania, inheriting a bloody insurrection. He suppressed it and governed for a lengthy period, with noted punctilio to legal procedures. At some point in the 80s Flaccus was appointed governor of Gallia Transalpina (southern France); it is possible that at the same time he was also governor of Gallia Cisalpina (northern Italy). It is not known whether he retained his governorships in Hispania at the same time.

Flaccus remained neutral in the series of conflicts between the Marius-Cinna faction and that of Sulla, until his brother Lucius Flaccus was killed by a supporter of Marius and Cinna. He then shifted towards supporting Sulla, without overtly declaring for him. Sulla triumphed in 82 and Flaccus celebrated a triumph under his dictatorship.

== Life and career ==
Valerius Flaccus was praetor, a senior administrative and judicial position, sometime before 95 BC, most probably in 96. An inscription from Claros (in modern Turkey) indicates that following his praetorship and before 95 he held a promagisterial, or senior military, command in the Roman province of Asia. Both he and his brother Lucius, who was a governor of Asia in the late 90s and again for 85, are honored as patrons of the city of Colophon in Ionia. The two are the first Roman governors known to be addressed as patrons of a free city, a practice that became common in the 60s BC.

Flaccus may have been a candidate for the consulship of 94, losing to the novus homo ("new man") Gaius Coelius Caldus, who is said to have run against two nobiles and beaten one of them. It was not unusual for a defeated candidate to run again the following year, as Flaccus did, often with success. Flaccus was successful in being elected as a consul in 93; his colleague was M. Herennius.

=== Proponent of citizenship ===
In 96, while praetor urbanus, the senior magistrate of the city of Rome, Flaccus sponsored legislation to grant citizenship to Calliphana of Velia, a priestess of Ceres. Julius Caesar, in his account of the Gallic Wars, identifies the Helvian Celt Caburus as another recipient of citizenship from Flaccus, during his time as governor of Gallia Transalpina. Caburus followed custom in assuming his patron's gentilic name Gaius Valerius. This interest in expanding citizenship may be viewed in the context of the family's moderate popularism and their relations with social inferiors. Ernst Badian noted that the Valerii Flacci "were given to taking up new men and families: inscriptions (Inschr. V. Magn. 144f.) reveal a policy of low-class connections."

=== Hispania ===
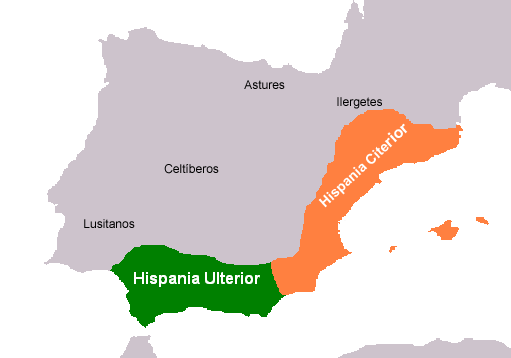
The Roman provinces in Hispania

Flaccus succeeded Titus Didius as proconsul of Hispania Citerior, a province in north east Hispania, in 92, and assumed his post before the conclusion of his consulship in order to deal with an uprising among the Celtiberi, the major native group of the central-eastern Iberian Peninsula. The historian Appian says the revolt was motivated by the exceptional cruelty and treachery of Didius, who had dealt with unrest and crime among the poor by promising them land to live on and then luring them into a trap. When the families had assembled within a Roman fort for the required registration, Didius slaughtered them all. While implying that the revolt against Didius was justified, Appian's account of the subsequent actions of Flaccus is not overtly critical. In an attempt to restore order, Flaccus engaged in armed conflicts that left 20,000 Celtiberi dead. At Belgida, however, the local senate refused to issue an official declaration of war against Rome, or were perhaps still deliberating. The rebels set fire to the structure and burned their own senators alive. The local reaction to the mass murder of their governing class was no doubt mixed. Flaccus appears to have been successful in halting large-scale violence, perhaps because he capitalized on any outrage or ambivalence within the community at the deaths of their senators and executed those responsible.

Flaccus remained in Hispania longer than any other Roman governor had up to that time, and he seems to have been in charge of Hispania Ulterior as well as Citerior. His extended command probably resulted from the disruptions of the Social War and its aftermath, and the civil wars of the 80s. After stabilizing the region, Flaccus appears to have governed prudently and with respect to legal authority.

==== Contrebian water rights ====
Flaccus remained in Hispania as governor at least until 87, as evidenced by the Tabula Contrebiensis, a bronze tablet on which are inscribed his civil laws pertaining to boundaries and water-rights arbitration. The document is written in Latin and based on Roman legal formulae, but the judges are the local senate of Contrebia Balaisca (near present-day Botorrita). Flaccus understood the legal issue as a distinction between ager publicus and ager privatus, publicly held and private land. He used a legal fiction to show how the principles of the two communities involved in the dispute could be applied mutually, and provided a Roman legal framework within which the Contrebians could cite precedent from Celtiberian law.

=== Gaul ===
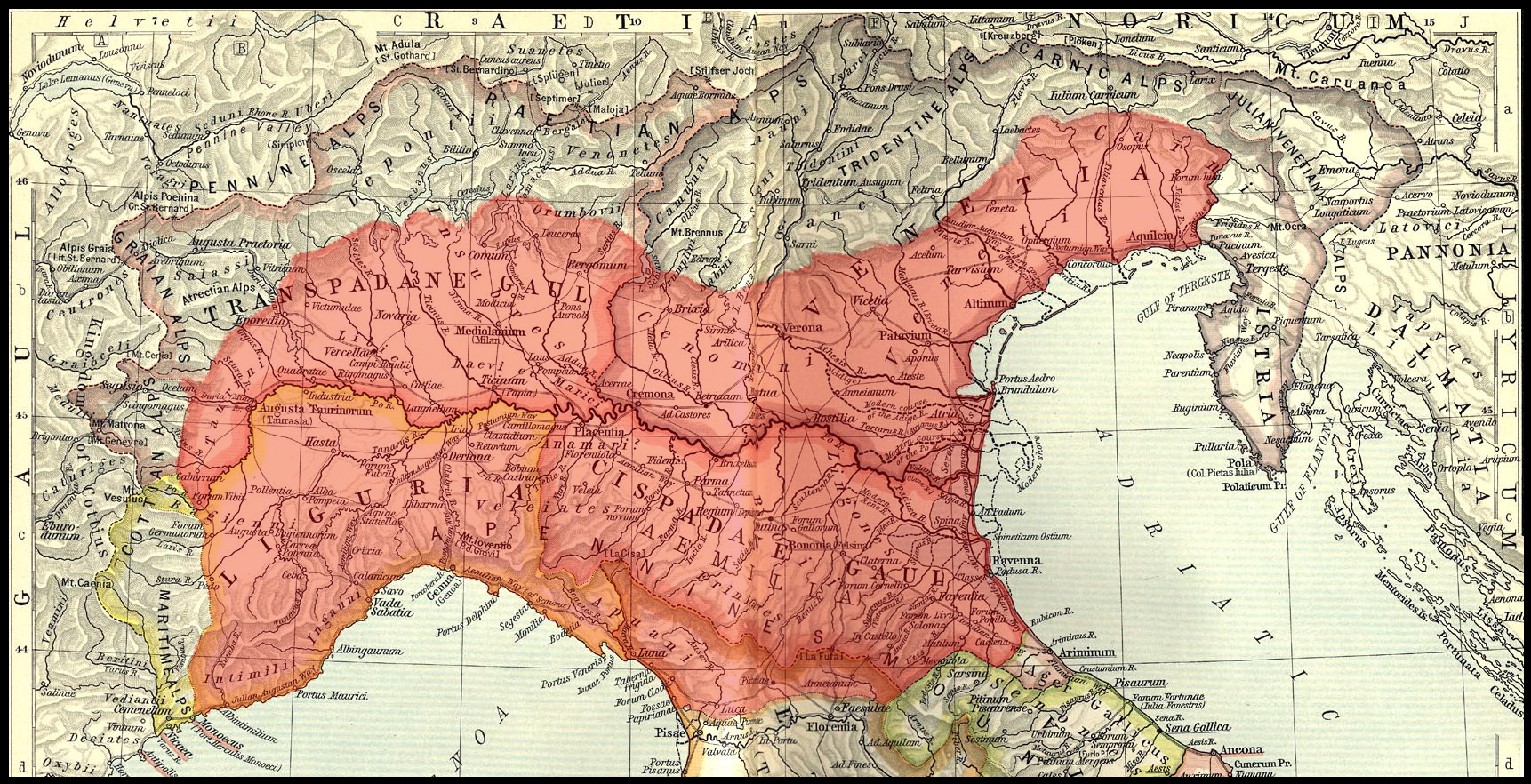
Cisalpine Gaul in northern Italy

At some point in the 80s Flaccus was appointed governor of Gallia Transalpina (Transalpina). The other Gallic province was Gallia Cisalpina (Cisalpina), the ethnically Celtic north of Italy. The two Gallic provinces were often governed jointly, and no other promagistrate is recorded for Cisalpina, for the period 87–82, so Flaccus may well have governed both provinces jointly. Scholars have been unable to determine the extent to which Flaccus's terms as governor in Hispania and Gaul were overlapping or sequential, as a continuous line of succession can rarely be traced for any province. A dual governorship of both provinces has been disparaged as "unprecedented", but no other promagistrate is documented for Hispania in this period, and since the senate only began assigning Transalpine Gaul as a regular provincia in the mid-90s, administrative arrangements were still evolving. By 85, Flaccus was "firmly installed" in Transalpina, though Cicero, as Badian notes, refrains from calling him the lawful governor there. He was acclaimed imperator and retained his province until he celebrated a triumph over Celtiberia and Gaul in 81. It is possible to argue that by the mid-80s, Flaccus was responsible for both Gallia Transalpina and Cisalpina, as well as Hispania Ulterior and Citerior.

The longevity of Flaccus's command has been cited as evidence that the prolongment of Julius Caesar's term in Gaul in the 50s, and the five-year proconsular commands granted to Pompeius Magnus and Marcus Crassus after their joint consulship in 55, were less exceptional than has sometimes been thought.

==== The case of Quinctius ====
In 83 BC, Flaccus was brought into a property dispute between Publius Quinctius and Naevius. Quinctius had inherited land in Transalpina from his brother, Gaius Quinctius, along with attached debts. Naevius, who had been the brother's business partner, tried to foreclose on the property, and ejected Quinctius by force. Flaccus ruled that Naevius had seized the property improperly and ordered restitution. Two years later, the case, still dragging on, helped launch the career of Cicero, who in 81 was a young advocate in his mid-twenties arguing on behalf of Quinctius: the speech survives as the extant pro Quinctio.

== Role in civil war ==
If Flaccus governed both Hispanias and both Gauls, or any combination of the four provinces, the armed forces at his disposal were unmatched in the western empire. "The loyalty of these armies," it has been noted, "was crucial to the State." Until 85 BC or later, Flaccus either supported or acted in no way contrary to the interests of the Marian and Cinnan faction, which held the consulship from 87 to 82 BC. He appears to have been attempting to preserve legitimate authority while remaining neutral in the factional conflict, though the Valerii Flacci were generally popularist in their politics and had strong ties to Gaius Marius.

The death of Flaccus's brother, Lucius, marks a turning point. Lucius Valerius Flaccus was the suffect consul who completed Marius's term after his death in 86. He was sent as governor to the Roman province of Asia, where he was murdered in 85 by the mutinous Gaius Flavius Fimbria, who then took command of the troops assigned to Lucius. The Cinnan government failed to take action against Fimbria, who had been a particularly partisan supporter of the Marian faction. Lucius's son, also named Lucius, fled Asia and sought refuge with his uncle in Massalia (present-day Marseille), then still an independent Greek city-state. This nephew was the Lucius Valerius Flaccus defended by Cicero in his speech Pro Flacco two decades later.

No replacement for Flaccus was sent from Rome, but doubts about his allegiance were perhaps raised. Cinna was assassinated in 84; Sulla returned to Italy in 83, stormed and captured Rome and had himself declared dictator. The Marian-Cinnan faction, now led by the son of Gaius Marius, set about securing Hispania, which Flaccus, given the vastness of his command, could only have been administering through legates, high ranking, semi-autonomous, military officers, such as the disreputable Marcus Fonteius. That the armed forces of Hispania might ally with the Sullan forces now in Italy was a dangerous possibility for the besieged government. When the young Marcus Crassus, the future triumvir, had raised Spanish troops for Sulla in 84, Flaccus did nothing to stop him. Quintus Sertorius, impeccably loyal to the anti-Sullan cause, was sent overland to the Iberian Peninsula with a relatively small force in late 83 or early 82. Flaccus allowed Sertorius to march through Transalpina, and Sertorius likewise took no action against the authority of Flaccus. The Marians may have wished to secure their interests in the west without requiring Flaccus to take sides in a direct confrontation: "The government could ill afford to alienate the man even further when he had shown no actual sign of disaffection." Sertorius was a logical successor to govern Hispania because he had served there earlier, and to relieve Flaccus after such a prolonged term was reasonable rather than provocative.

No sources identify Flaccus as a Sullan, but the governor could have signalled his displeasure by withholding tax revenues. Flaccus tilts observably only after Sulla gained control of Cisalpine Gaul. Flaccus's cousin, the princeps senatus named Lucius Valerius Flaccus (also the name of his brother), may have been an influence in Gaius's shift toward Sulla. He sponsored the Lex Valeria, the legislation that made Sulla dictator at the end of 82 or the beginning of 81. Flaccus had his triumph under the dictatorship, an honor Sulla would hardly have permitted had Flaccus not supported his regime. Flaccus was in his mid-50s or older at the time.

=== Coinage ===
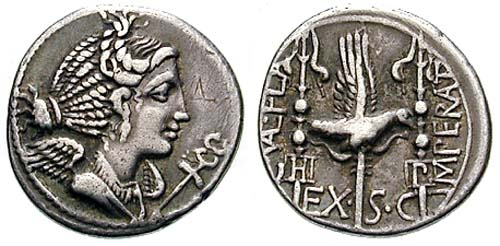
Denarius issued in 82 BC by Gaius Valerius Flaccus, depicting Victory

After Sulla emerged victorious, the senate authorized Flaccus to strike coinage to cover expenses for his final months in command. Many examples of this military issue have survived. In 82, to commemorate his victories, the mint in Massalia issued a denarius depicting a winged bust of Victory and a caduceus on the obverse. The reverse shows a legionary aquila flanked by military standards. The one on the left is marked with an H (for Hastati, spearmen), the one on the right P (Principes, also a term for spearmen). Below is EX.S.C, for ex senatus consulto, "by decree of the senate". On the left appears C.VAL.FLA, for the name Caius Valerius Flaccus, with IMPERAT (for imperator) on the right. Flaccus's coin is modeled after a Sullan type, and the symbolism of coins minted in Hispania and Gaul during the period frequently advertised "legitimacy and military success". The output has been estimated at 540,000 denarii coins.

== Selected primary sources ==
- Cicero Pro Balbo 24
- Schol. Bob. ad Cic. p. Flacc. p. 233, ed. Orelli
- Appian, The Spanish Wars 100

== Selected bibliography ==
- Badian, E. "Notes on Provincial Governors" and "Waiting for Sulla." As reprinted in Studies in Greek and Roman History. New York 1964.
- Brennan, T. Corey. The Praetorship in the Roman Republic. Oxford University Press, 2000. Limited preview online.
- Frier, Bruce W. "Sulla's Propaganda: The Collapse of the Cinnan Republic." American Journal of Philology 92 (1971) 585–604.
- Konrad, Christoph F. Plutarch's Sertorius: A Historical Commentary. University of North Carolina Press, 1994. Limited preview online.
- Lovano, Michael. The Age of Cinna: Crucible of Late Republican Rome. Franz Steiner Verlag, 2002. Limited preview online.
- Smith, William (2005). A Dictionary of Greek and Roman Biography and Mythology. Ann Arbor, Michigan: University of Michigan Library.

Political offices
Preceded by Gaius Coelius Caldus and Lucius Domitius Ahenobarbus	Consul of the Roman Republic with Marcus Herennius; 93 BC	Succeeded by Gaius Claudius Pulcher and Marcus Perperna
