= Gaius Coelius Caldus =

Roman senator

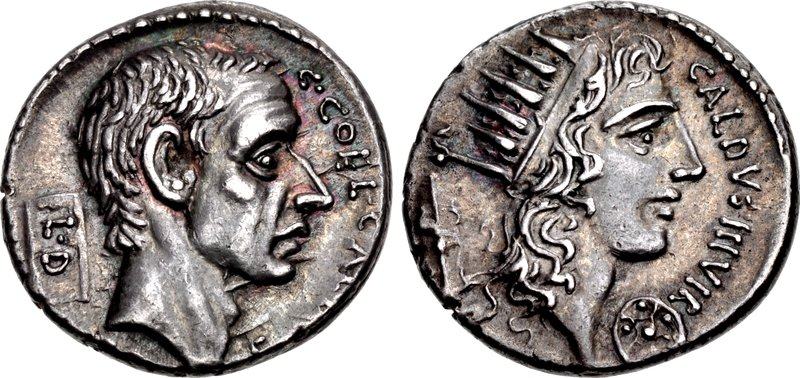
- Caldus portrayed in a denarius minted by his grandson in 51 BC
- Office: Consul (94 BC)

Gaius Coelius Caldus was a consul of the Roman Republic in 94 BC alongside his colleague Lucius Domitius Ahenobarbus.

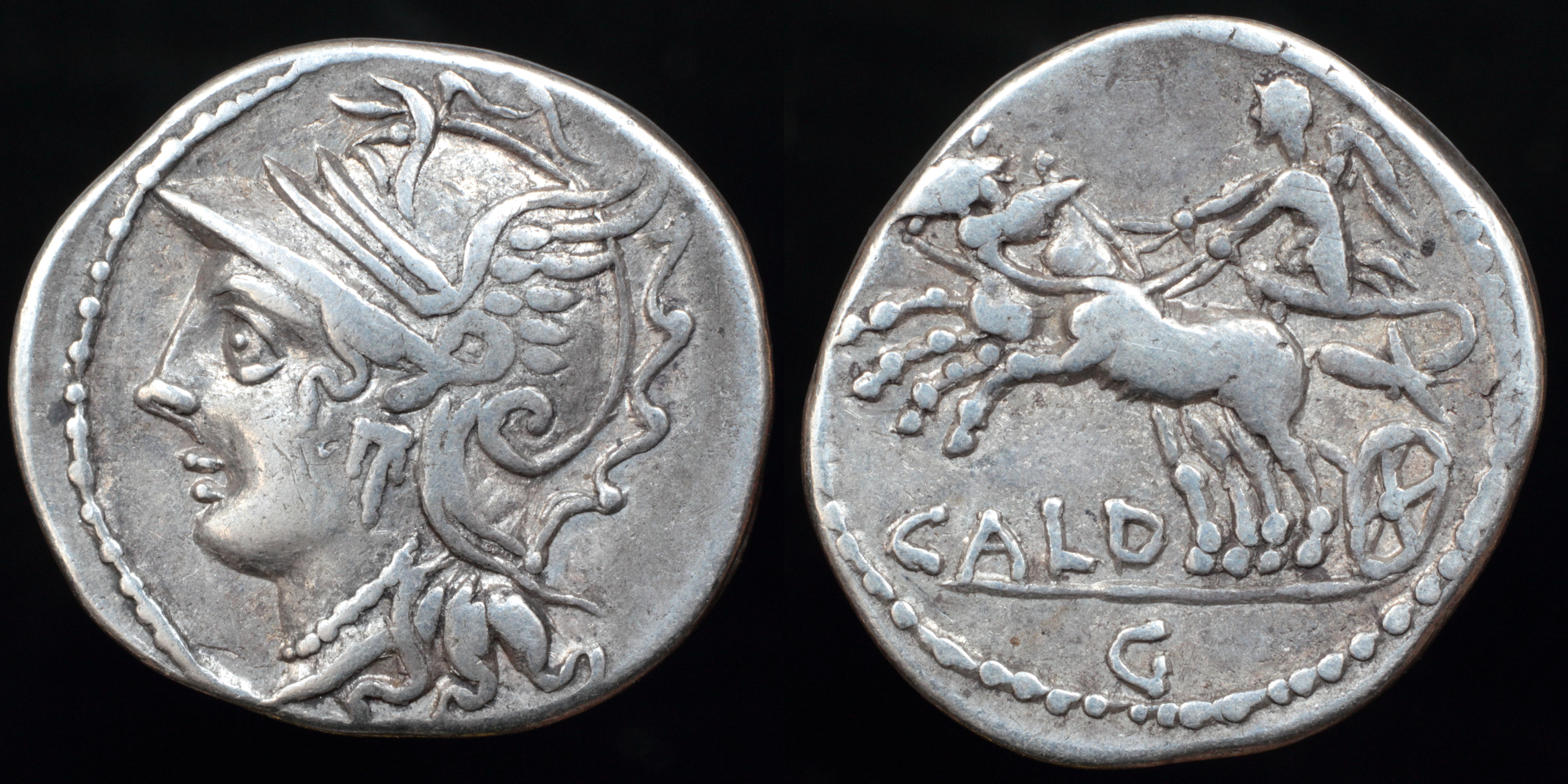
Silver denarius struck by Gaius Coelius Caldus in Rome 104 BC.

In 107 BC, Coelius Caldus was elected tribune of the plebs and passed a lex tabellaria, which ordained that in cases of high treason in the courts of justice the voting should be secret with each voter marking their decision on a clay tablet. Cicero stated that Caldus regretted this law as having been the source of injury to the republic. He was a praetor in 100 or 99 BC, and proconsul of Hispania Citerior the following year.

Coelius' portrait appears on a small series of Roman silver coins from the late republic. Some of his coins feature the boar emblem of Clunia.

Political offices
Preceded by Lucius Licinius Crassus; Q. Mucius Scaevola	Roman consul 94 BC; With: Lucius Domitius Ahenobarbus	Succeeded by Gaius Valerius Flaccus; Marcus Herennius
