= Lucius Domitius Ahenobarbus (consul 94 BC) =

Roman consul 94 BC

Lucius Domitius Ahenobarbus was a politician in ancient Rome during the late 2nd and early 1st century BC. He served as praetor in Sicily, probably in 96 BC, shortly after the Second Servile War, when slaves had been forbidden to carry arms. He ordered a slave to be crucified for killing a wild boar with a hunting spear. He was consul in 94 BC. In the civil war between Gaius Marius and Sulla, he took the side of the latter, and was murdered at Rome by the praetor Damasippus on the orders of Gaius Marius the Younger.

He was the son of Gnaeus Domitius Ahenobarbus, the consul in 122 BC, and brother of Gnaeus Domitius Ahenobarbus, the consul in 96.

== See also ==
- Ahenobarbus (disambiguation), or others of this family

Political offices
Preceded by L. Licinius Crassus; Q. Mucius Scaevola	Roman consul 94 BC; With: Gaius Coelius Caldus	Succeeded by C. Valerius Flaccus; Marcus Herennius
