= Lucius Licinius Crassus =

Roman statesman and orator (140–91 BC)

Consul of the Roman Republic
- In office 1 January 95 BC – 31 December 95 BC Serving with Quintus Mucius Scaevola Pontifex
- Preceded by: Gaius Cassius Longinus and Gnaeus Domitius Ahenobarbus
- Succeeded by: Lucius Domitius Ahenobarbus and Gaius Coelius Caldus

Personal details
- Born: 140 BC Rome
- Died: September 91 BC (aged 48–49)
- Party: Optimates
- Spouse: Mucia (daughter of Q. Mucius Scaevola Augur)
- Children: Licinia (married Publius Cornelius Scipio Nasica); Licinia (married Quintus Metellus Pius); Licinia (married Gaius Marius the Younger); Lucius Licinius Crassus Scipio (adopted)

Lucius Licinius Crassus (140 – September 91 BC) was a Roman orator and statesman who was a Roman consul and censor and who is also one of the main speakers in Cicero's dramatic dialogue on the art of oratory De Oratore, set just before Crassus' death in 91 BC. He was considered the greatest orator of his day by his pupil Cicero.

== Early life ==
Lucius Licinius Crassus was born in 140 BC. It is not known exactly which Licinius Crassus his father was, as there are a number of similarly named Licinii Crassi active in the mid-second century BC. However, prosopographical investigations by scholars have established that he must have been a grandson of Gaius Licinius Crassus, the consul of 168 who marched his army from Gallia Cisalpina to Macedonia against the will of the Senate. Lucius was, therefore, the child of one of this Gaius Crassus' sons.

Lucius was taught at a young age by the Roman historian and jurist Lucius Coelius Antipater. He also studied law under two eminent statesmen, both of whom were from branches of the Mucii Scaevolae gens: Publius Mucius Scaevola (the father of Crassus' colleague as consul, Quintus Mucius Scaevola 'Pontifex'); and Quintus Mucius Scaevola Augur. The latter was still alive in the year of Crassus' death (91 BC), and appears alongside Crassus as a character in Cicero's De Oratore; he was also the father of Crassus' wife, Mucia.

== Political career ==
=== Early career ===
==== Prosecution of C. Papirius Carbo ====
In 119 BC, when aged only 21, Crassus shot to fame for his prosecution of the proconsul Gaius Papirius Carbo, who committed suicide rather than face the inevitable guilty verdict. From this point on, Crassus was recognised as one of the foremost orators in Rome.

However, Crassus came to regret this celebrated prosecution because it brought him many political enemies. One such enemy was Carbo's son, Gaius Papirius Carbo Arvina, who followed Crassus to his province in 94 BC with the aim of gathering evidence for a revenge prosecution. Crassus was remembered by later Romans for his wise response to the younger Carbo; instead of sending him away from his camp, Crassus in fact invited Carbo into his closest circle of advisors so that he might win over his former enemy.

==== Other early activity ====
Little else is known of Crassus' political activities in the 110s BC. He is known to have supported the efforts of Gnaeus Domitius Ahenobarbus to create a citizen colony at Narbo Martius in 117 BC. At the age of twenty-seven, Crassus defended his relative Licinia, one of the Vestal Virgins who had been accused of breaking their vow of chastity that year. Crassus was successful during Licinia's first prosecution in front of the pontifices, and she was acquitted. However, she was prosecuted again by the special inquisitor Lucius Cassius Longinus Ravilla in early 113. This time, Crassus was not successful, and Licinia was consequently buried alive.

Crassus served as quaestor sometime around the year 109 BC. He was appointed to the province of Asia Minor. On his return journey, he studied rhetoric at Athens, but departed after a dispute with the locals. Having missed the ceremony of the Eleusinian Mysteries by only two days, Crassus requested that the Athenians repeat the affair so that he too might be initiated. When the Athenians refused, he angrily left the city. It seems Crassus related this anecdote to the young Cicero, who recorded it many years later in the De Oratore.

Crassus served as tribune of the plebs in 107 BC at the age of 33. His tribunate was as an example of a notably "quiet" one: Cicero had not realised Crassus even served as tribune until he read about it by chance in a passage of Lucilius.

Crassus probably served as aedile in 100 BC. Alongside Scaevola Pontifex (his future colleague in the consulship), Crassus put on expensive games for the people, which were remembered decades afterwards for their extravagance.

==== Equestrian juries debate, 106 BC ====
As was common with many young politicians at the start of the cursus honorum, Crassus had employed popularis overtones in his prosecution of Carbo. But over time, he became an increasingly staunch defender of conservative values.

In 106 BC, Crassus gave a speech in which he defended the Lex Servilia, a law proposed by the consul Quintus Servilius Caepio which aimed to end the equestrian monopoly on juries. Since the legislative reforms of Gaius Gracchus, jurors for a number of important courts had been drawn only from the ranks of the equites. Crassus and the other conservative senators (the optimates) wanted mixed juries drawn from both senators and equestrians. He therefore attacked the equestrian courts in a speech, considered by Cicero (who preserves the following quotation from the speech) to be Crassus' finest moment:

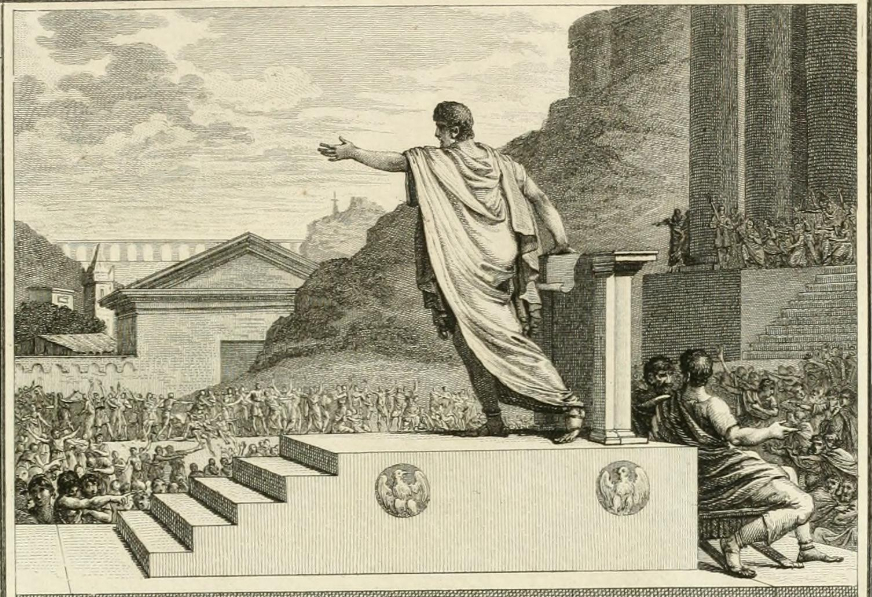
An orator (Gaius Gracchus) addressing the Roman People

Save us from wretchedness, save us from the fangs of men whose cruelty can only be satisfied by our blood; do not let us be slaves to others, unless to you alone, the whole People, to whom we may and should be servants.

Crassus' oratory won the day, and the Lex Servilia was successfully passed. It was, however, to prove short-lived, as a few years later a law of Gaius Servilius Glaucia (passed either in 104 or 101 BC) restored the equestrian monopoly on the juries.

Regardless of the long-term outcome of the Lex Servilia, Crassus' speech was highly celebrated. It became a literal model of Roman eloquence, and was being studied in a textbook by the young Cicero a few years later. In the last year of his life, Crassus once again attacked the equestrian juries when he championed the legislation of Marcus Livius Drusus the Younger in 91 BC (see below).

When Quintus Servilius Caepio, the proposer of the jury law in question, was prosecuted in 103 BC by the tribune Gaius Norbanus for his catastrophic loss at the Battle of Arausio, Crassus defended him. Crassus lost the case, and Caepio was exiled.

When consul in 95 BC, Crassus successfully defended Caepio's son, Quintus Servilius Caepio the Younger, from an unspecified charge. However, Cicero notes that in this instance Crassus' defence of the younger Caepio was rather half-hearted: "for its laudatory purpose, it was long enough; but as a whole oration it was very brief".

=== Consulship ===
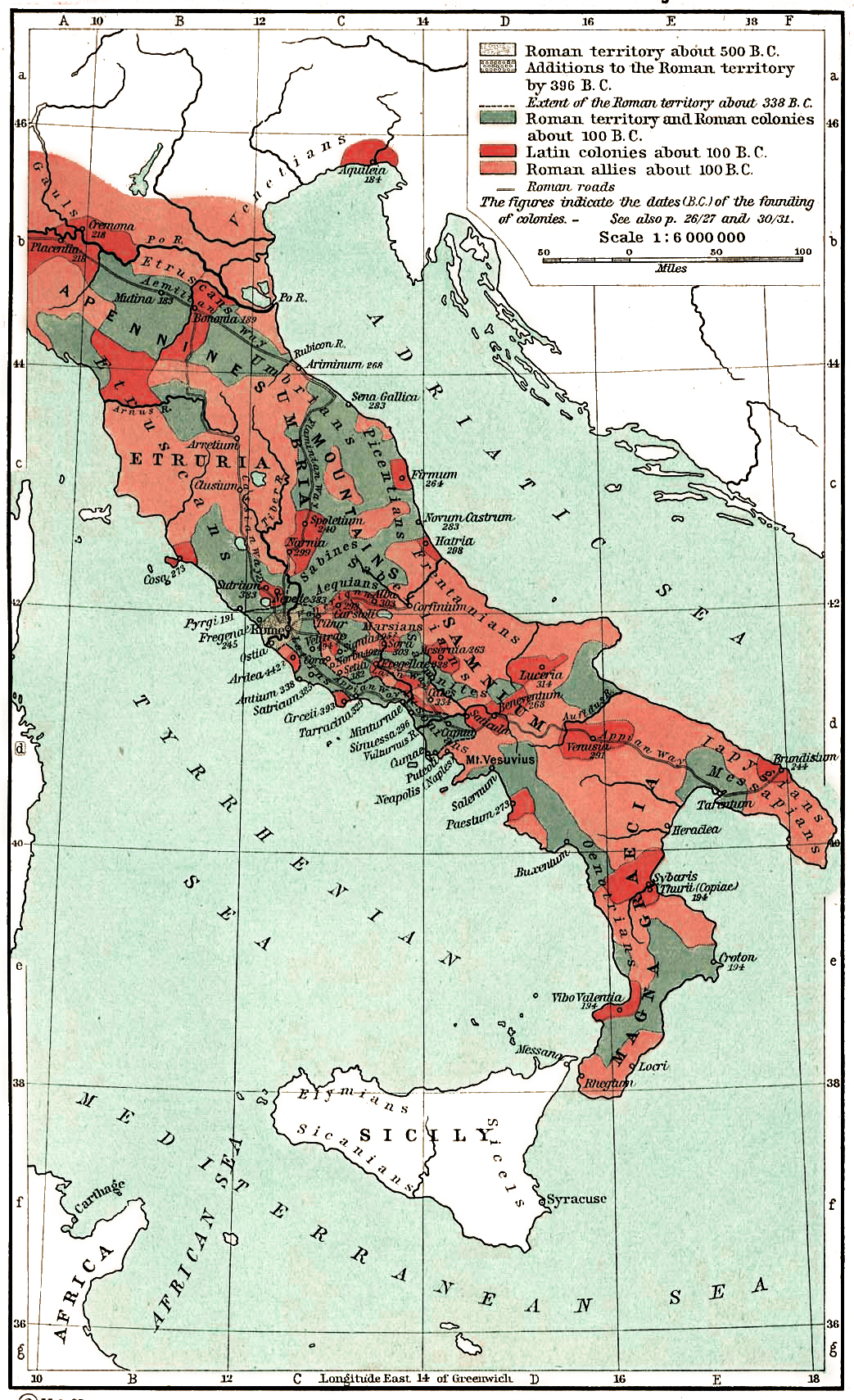
Map showing the distribution of Italian, Latin, and Roman territory during the 90s BC

Crassus had probably served as praetor by 98 BC. He was elected consul for 95 BC alongside his long-term ally Quintus Mucius Scaevola Pontifex. It was during this consulship that Crassus defended the younger Caepio from an unspecified charge (see above).

==== Lex Licinia Mucia ====
The most notable act of Crassus and Scaevola's consulship was the Lex Licinia Mucia. This was an infamous law that targeted any foreigners who were illegally masquerading as Roman citizens. The law created an investigatory court (quaestio) tasked with forcing such individuals to revert to their former citizenships.

It was very unpopular, particularly among the non-Roman Italian allies. In fact, it was so controversial that later Roman commentators sometimes saw it as a main cause of the Social War (91–88 BC) that began several years later.

=== Proconsulship ===
==== Gallic triumph ====
Crassus was granted Cisalpine Gaul as his proconsular province for 94 BC. Despite defeating a number of Gallic raiders, he failed to gain a triumph due to the veto of his consular colleague, Scaevola Pontifex.

Cicero later judged that Crassus had been in the wrong, remarking that 'Crassus almost ransacked the Alps with a probe, in order to find any pretext for a triumph in an area where there were no enemies'. But even if Crassus was acting unscrupulously, Scaevola's veto is still remarkable. Theodor Mommsen, for instance, could find no precedent for it whatsoever. The veto is particularly inexplicable given the former friendship between the two men: they had, after all, shared office at every stage of the cursus honorum, as Cicero points out, and there had been no signs of hostility during their consulship.

==== Causa Curiana ====
It was likely in 94 BC that Crassus won the so-called "Causa Curiana" – an infamous inheritance dispute between Manius Curius and the family of one Marcus Coponius. Crassus represented Curius in the case, while Scaevola Pontifex represented the Coponii family. Cicero refers to the dispute many times during his works.

Coponius had left an as-yet-unborn son as his chief heir, with Curius as the substitute heir until the son came of age. However, Coponius soon died and no son was born. The Coponii therefore claimed that the prerequisite conditions (i.e., the birth of a son) had never been fulfilled, meaning that the will should be rendered invalid. However Crassus successfully convinced the Centumviral Court that Curius was the rightful heir, thereby securing Marcus Coponius' considerable inheritance for Curius alone. Cicero considered Crassus' defence the perfect example of how to win a case through terminological niceties.

=== Censorship ===
In 92 BC Crassus was elected censor with Gnaeus Domitius Ahenobarbus. The two colleagues were well remembered by ancient sources for their petty disputes—for example, in exchanging insults over one another's luxurious mansions. Eventually, these public quarrels forced them to abdicate the position early, amid much scandal and controversy.

==== Schools of Latin Rhetoric ====
Crassus and Ahenobarbus did manage to agree on passing a famous edict, preserved for us in a later work by Suetonius, that banned the so-called 'schools of Latin rhetoric'. Instead of the usual Greek, these schools taught their students rhetoric in Latin. It seems this was considered immoral and un-Roman - Cicero called them 'schools of impudence' - and this might explain why Crassus and Ahenobarbus believed the edict necessary. However, some modern scholars have sought political reasons for the act as well.

=== 91 BC ===
Crassus died suddenly in September 91 BC, but was politically active until the final days of his life. Alongside the princeps senatus Marcus Aemilius Scaurus, Crassus was the main conservative champion of the radical tribune Marcus Livius Drusus, whose legislative package of reforms was planned as a means of reconciling the interests of the Senate, the equestrians, and the urban poor.

In particular, Crassus gave a memorable speech on the 13 September 91 BC defending Livius Drusus from the attacks of the consul Lucius Marcius Philippus. In the words of Cicero, 'this was literally Crassus' "swan song" ... for he fell sick and died a week later'.

Crassus' unexpected death robbed Drusus of one of his most influential supporters, and Philippus soon succeeded in his attempts to have all of Drusus' legislation abrogated on religious technicalities. Drusus was eventually assassinated by an unknown hand, an event commonly viewed by ancient sources as precipitating the outbreak of the Social War (91–88 BC).

== Oratorical Skill ==
Cicero praises Crassus' oratorical skill at many points in his surviving texts. For example, in Cicero's history of oratory (a work known as the Brutus after its dedicatee Marcus Junius Brutus the Younger), Crassus is portrayed as the greatest Roman orator to have yet lived. Indeed, Cicero believes that the only two orators to come close to Crassus' skill were Crassus' contemporary Marcus Antonius Orator (grandfather of the famous Mark Antony) and Cicero himself. Cicero weighs up the relative skills of Antonius and Crassus with the following words:

For my part, though I assign to Antonius all the virtues that have pointed out above, I still hold that nothing could have been more perfect than Crassus. He possessed great dignity, and combined with dignity a pleasantry and wit, not smart nor vulgar, but suited to the orator; his Latinity was careful and well chosen, but without affected preciseness; in presentation and argument his lucidity was admirable; in handling questions, whether of the civil law or of natural equity and justice, he was fertile in argument and fertile in analogies ... No one could surpass the resourcefulness of Crassus.

Cicero's admiration for Crassus and Antonius is also evident in the De Oratore, his treatise on the art of oratory. In this, they appear as the two central characters of the dialogue, debating the attributes of the ideal orator in the presence of a number of younger aspiring orators, including Gaius Aurelius Cotta, Publius Sulpicius Rufus, and Gaius Julius Caesar Strabo.

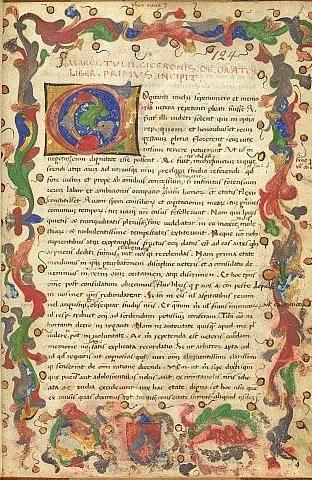
First page of a miniature of Cicero's De oratore, 15th century, Northern Italy, now at the British Museum

As well as the skills praised above, Crassus was said to have extensive knowledge of the Roman legal system. Cicero calls Crassus the 'ablest jurist in the ranks of orators', capable even of besting his (and Cicero's) former mentor, the great jurist Quintus Mucius Scaevola Augur. Cicero also notes with admiration the intense preparation Crassus undertook before every case; this was all the more necessary because Roman orators very rarely came into court with more than a few written notes with them.

In terms of Crassus' oratorical style, he apparently kept the ideal line between extremes; neither too active nor too still, neither too impassioned nor too calm, witty and yet always dignified:

No violent movements of the body, no sudden variation of voice, no walking up and down, no frequent stamping of the foot; his language vehement, sometimes angry and filled with righteous indignation; much wit but always dignified, and, what is most difficult, he was at once ornate and brief.

Cicero also notes that Crassus liked to break up his sentences into many short, sharp clauses, the effect being to create a simple style of speaking ('a natural complexion, free of make up').

It is also noted by Cicero in De Oratore that Licinius Crassus was a friend of the philosopher Marcus Vigellius.

== Personal life ==
=== Family ===
Licinius Crassus was married to a daughter of the Consul Quintus Mucius Scaevola Augur (not to be confused with Crassus' consular colleague, Quintus Mucius Scaevola Pontifex) and his wife Laelia, who was a daughter of Gaius Laelius Sapiens. He had two daughters. One married Publius Cornelius Scipio Nasica, the son of the consul of 111 BC. The other married Gaius Marius the Younger, the son of the general and seven-time consul Gaius Marius, probably in 94 or 93 BC.

Crassus adopted his grandson by his elder daughter and Scipio Nasica, who became Lucius Licinius Crassus Scipio.

Crassus was only distantly related to the famous triumvir Marcus Licinius Crassus, twenty-five years his junior.

=== Luxurious lifestyle ===
Crassus was somewhat infamous in later generations for his luxurious lifestyle. In particular, he was notably the first Roman to use columns made of imported marble, in this case from Mt. Hymettus in Greece. His contemporaries also mocked him for this luxury. A Marcus Brutus dubbed him the 'Palatine Venus' for the apparent effeminacy of the columns, and a serious dispute broke out between Crassus and his colleague as censor, Gnaeus Domitius Ahenobarbus, over the marble.

Crassus also had a beloved pet eel, much to the bemusement of later Roman commentators. When Crassus held a funeral for the pet, the same Domitius Ahenobarbus snidely commented on the affair. Crassus retorted: "did you not bury three wives and not shed a tear?"

== See also ==
- Licinia gens
- De Oratore (Ciceronian work)
- Brutus (Ciceronian work)

Political offices
Preceded by Cn. Domitius Ahenobarbus; C. Cassius Longinus	Roman consul 95 BC; With: Quintus Mucius Scaevola	Succeeded by C. Coelius Caldus; L. Domitius Ahenobarbus
Preceded by Lucius Valerius Flaccus; Marcus Antonius	Roman censor 92 BC (abdicated); With: Gnaeus Domitius Ahenobarbus	Succeeded by Publius Licinius Crassus; Lucius Julius Caesar
