= Lucius Marcius Philippus (consul 91 BC) =

Roman orator and politician (c.141–c.73 BC)

- Born: c. 141 BC
- Died: c. 73 BC
- Office: Plebeian tribune (104 BC); Consul (91 BC); Censor (86 BC)
- Children: Lucius Marcius Philippus (cos 56 BC)

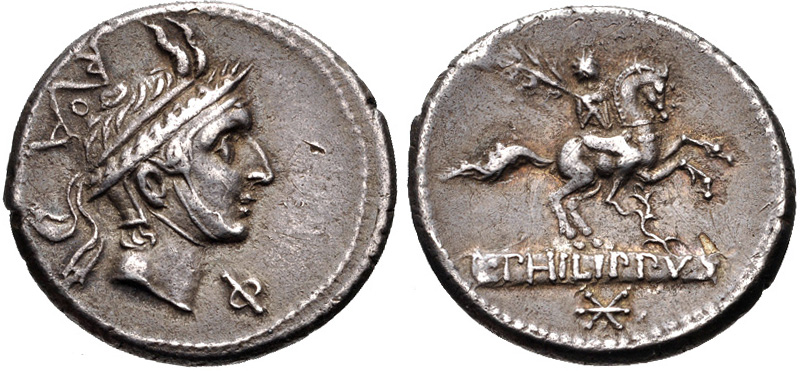
Denarius of Lucius Marcius Philippus, minted c. 113 BC. The obverse depicts Philip V of Macedon. The reverse displays a triumphator, either Quintus Marcius Tremulus, who triumphed in 306 BC, or Quintus Marcius Philippus, who triumphed in 281.

Lucius Marcius Philippus (c. 141 – c. 73 BC) was a Roman orator and an important politician of the late Roman Republic.

His strenuous opposition to the reforms of Marcus Livius Drusus during his consulship of 91 BC was instrumental in the outbreak of the disastrous Bellum Italicum, the Social War. He did well under the Marian government during the mid-80s BC, holding the high office of censor in 86 BC. However, he took advantage of the political amnesty offered by Sulla during the civil war of 83 BC and changed sides, along with other Marians of later importance, such as Marcus Aemilius Lepidus (cos. 78) and Marcus Junius Brutus (tr. pl. 83), Publius Cethegus, and Pompey. Philippus led the force that took Sardinia for Sulla, killing and replacing that province's praetor, Quintus Antonius Balbus.

Philippus had backed the winner in the Civil War, and enjoyed a special eminence in the first decade after as one of the few surviving men of consular rank and as Rome's pre-eminent orator since the death of Marcus Antonius (late 87 BC). Following Sulla's death in 78 BC, he played a key role in the suppression of Lepidus' revolt (78–77 BC).

== Family ==
Philippus was the son of the Quintus Marcius Philippus who was triumvir monetalis some time between 134 and 114 BC. His mother Claudia was a daughter of Appius Claudius Pulcher, the consul in 143 and censor in 136 BC.

Philippus had a son of the same name who later became the consul of 56 BC.

== Tribunate ==
Marcius Philippus was plebeian tribune in 104 BC, during which time he brought forward an agrarian law, the details about which we are not informed, but which is chiefly memorable for the statement he made in recommending the measure, that there were not two thousand men in the state who possessed property. He also may have brought legislation to reform judicial procedures related to usury. He seems to have brought forward the agrarian measure chiefly with the view of acquiring popularity, and he quietly dropped it when he found there was no hope of carrying it.

In 100 BC, he defended the state along with other distinguished statesmen to protect it from Lucius Appuleius Saturninus.

== Consulship ==
In 93 BC he lost a campaign for the consulship to Marcus Herennius, but did reach the office in 91 BC with Sextus Julius Caesar as his colleague. This was a very turbulent year in Rome for Marcus Livius Drusus, a tribune of the plebs, who brought forward laws concerning the distribution of grain, assignation of public land, and the creation of colonies in Italy and Sicily. It is sufficient to state here that Drusus at first enjoyed the full confidence of the Roman Senate, especially as he was passing many laws beneficial to the people, and so endeavoured by his measures to reconcile the people to the senatorial party.

Philippus, on the other hand, offered a vigorous opposition to the tribune, and thus came into open conflict with the senate. On one occasion Philippus declared in the senate that he could no longer carry on the government with such a body, and that there was need of a new senate. This roused the great orator Lucius Licinius Crassus, who asserted in the course of his speech, in which he is said to have surpassed his usual eloquence, that that man could not be his consul who refused to recognise him as senator. This violence spilled out into the forum at other times. In an attempt to prevent Drusus from passing his laws, Philippus interrupted him. This caused Drusus to order his clients to drag Philippus to prison. The order was executed with such violence that the blood started from the nostrils of the consul, as he was dragged away by the throat. Nevertheless, Drusus successfully passed his laws in the assemblies.

Philippus reconciled himself with the senate, when members previously supportive of Drusus began to mistrust him. He, as an augur, convinced the senate to declare the laws of Drusus to be null and void because they were carried against the auspices.

== Civil wars and later life ==
Philippus did not play much of a part in the early stages of the civil wars of the 80s. While Cicero mentions that Philippus was sympathetic to Sulla, he remained in Rome unmolested during Cinna's time in power. He even became censor with Marcus Perperna in 86 BC, and is said to have expelled his own uncle Appius Claudius from the senate. However, Philippus went over to Sulla's side after the latter's return to Italy in 83 BC, and served as Sulla's legate in Sardinia during the war.

After Sulla's victory in 82 BC, Philippus was left as one of the most senior politicians in the much-depleted Senate, and may have delivered the main oration at Sulla's grand state funeral in 79 BC. As the de facto champion of Sulla's regime, Philippus became the main senatorial opponent of Marcus Aemilius Lepidus (father of the triumvir of the same name), who in 78 BC attempted to repeal the laws and constitution left in place by Sulla. Sallust preserves a version of Philippus' speech against Lepidus in his fragmentary Histories, in which Philippus rallies the Senate and proposes the senatus consultum ultimum charging Quintus Catulus and Pompey with putting down the revolt.

== Legacy as an orator ==
Philippus was one of the most distinguished orators of his time. His reputation continued even to the Augustan age, whence we read in Horace:

Strenuus et fortis causisque Philippus agendis Clarus.

Cicero says that Philippus was decidedly inferior as an orator to his two great contemporaries Crassus and Antonius, but was without question next to them, but far next (sed longo intervallo tamen proxumus. itaque eum, [...], neque secundum tamen neque tertium dixerim: "I could not call him a second or a third"). In speaking he possessed much freedom and wit; he was fertile in invention, and clear in the development of his ideas; and in altercation he was witty and sarcastic.

Perhaps the most famous example of his wit came in 77 BC. Neither of the consuls Mamercus Aemilius Lepidus Livianus nor Decimus Junius Brutus wanted to be sent to Spain to fight the rebellious general Quintus Sertorius. Pompey on the other hand had just put down the revolt of Marcus Aemilius Lepidus and wanted another command immediately. Philippus spoke in the Senate in favour of Pompey, and famously quipped:

non se illum sua sententia pro consule sed pro consulibus mittere
I give my vote to send him not as a proconsul [pro consule], but instead of the consuls [pro consulibus]

Philippus was also remarkably acquainted with Greek literature for his time. He was accustomed to speak extempore, and, when he rose to speak, he frequently did not know with what word he should begin: hence in his old age it was with both contempt and anger that he used to listen to the studied periods of Hortensius.

Philippus was a man of luxurious habits, which his wealth enabled him to gratify: his fish-ponds were particularly famous for their magnificence and extent, and are mentioned by the ancients along with those of Lucullus and Hortensius.

== Bibliography ==
- Broughton, Thomas Robert Shannon (1951). The magistrates of the Roman republic. Vol. 1. New York: American Philological Association.
- Crawford, Michael (1974). Roman Republican Coinage. Cambridge University Press. ISBN 978-0-521-07492-6. OCLC 450398085.
- Crook, John; et al., eds. (1994). The last age of the Roman Republic, 146–43 BC. Cambridge Ancient History. Vol. 9 (2nd ed.). Cambridge University Press. ISBN 0-521-85073-8. OCLC 121060.
- Zmeskal, Klaus (2009). Adfinitas (in German). Vol. 1. Passau: Verlag Karl Stutz. ISBN 978-3-88849-304-1.

Political offices
Preceded by Gaius Claudius Pulcher; Marcus Perperna	Roman consul 91 BC with Sextus Julius Caesar	Succeeded by Lucius Julius Caesar; Publius Rutilius Lupus
Preceded by Publius Licinius Crassus; Lucius Julius Caesar	Roman censor 86 BC with Marcus Perperna	Succeeded by Gnaeus Cornelius Lentulus Clodianus; Lucius Gellius
