= Lucilia gens =

Ancient Roman family

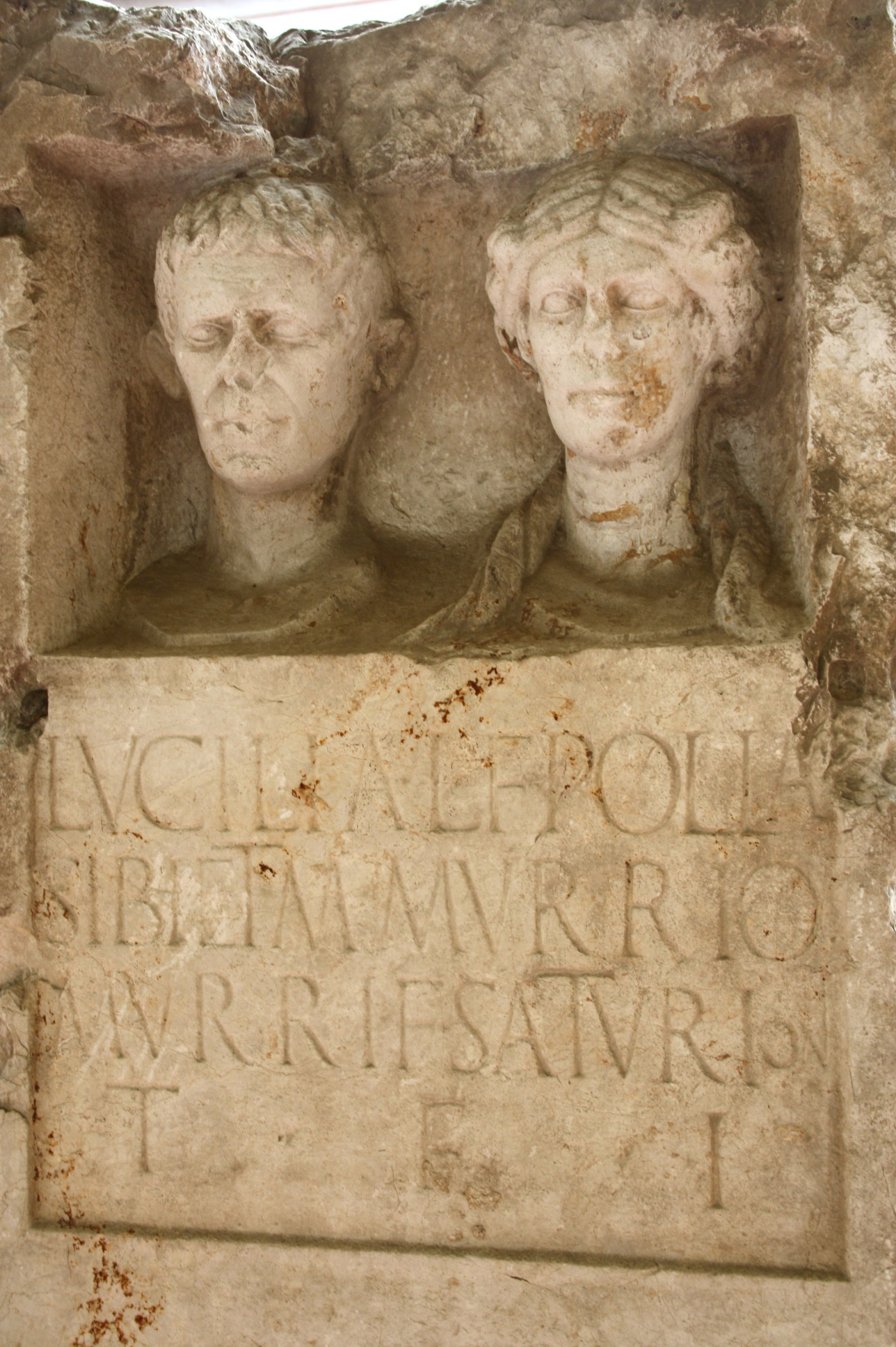
Monument of Lucilia Polla and Marcus Murrius Saturius, dating to the first century AD. Santa Giulia Museum, Brescia.

The gens Lucilia was a plebeian family of ancient Rome. The most famous member of this gens was the poet Gaius Lucilius, who flourished during the latter part of the second century BC. Although many Lucilii appear in Roman history, the only one known to have obtained any of the higher offices of the Roman state was Lucilius Longus, consul suffectus in AD 7.

== Origin ==
The nomen Lucilius is a patronymic surname, derived from the common Latin praenomen Lucius. The satirist Lucilius is said to have come from Suessa Aurunca, an ancient town of the Aurunci, where a Latin colony was established in 313 BC.

== Branches and cognomina ==
In the time of the Republic, the surnames of the Lucilii were Balbus and Bassus, the former originally referring to one who stammers, and the latter referring to someone stout or sturdy. Later, in imperial times, we find Capito, given to one with a large or prominent head, and Longus, "tall". Rufus, commonly given to someone with red hair, appears on coins of the Lucilii, but the cognomen is not mentioned by any ancient writer. A number of the Lucilii are mentioned without a surname.

== Members ==
- Gaius Lucilius, the originator of Roman satire, lived during the second century BC, and is said to have served in the Roman cavalry under Scipio Aemilianus during the Numantine War. When he died at Neapolis in 103 BC, he was honoured with a public funeral.
- Manius Lucilius M. f., a senator in 129 BC.
- Marcus Lucilius Rufus, as triumvir monetalis in 101 BC, minted coins depicting Pallas on the obverse, and Victoria driving a biga on the reverse.
- Lucius Lucilius L. f., praetor about 91 BC, governor of Asia.
- Sextus Lucilius was tribune of the plebs in 86 BC. He was a partisan of Sulla, but the following year, with Sulla's enemies in control of the city, he was hurled from the Tarpeian Rock by his successor, Publius Popillius Laenas.
- Lucius Lucilius Balbus, a jurist, who studied under Quintus Mucius Scaevola, and was in turn one of the instructors of Servius Sulpicius Rufus. Cicero describes him as a man of much learning, who gave his opinions in a slow and deliberate manner.
- Gaius Lucilius C. f. Hirrus, a merchant from Pompeii, was tribune of the plebs in 53 BC. From 43, he was in Sicily with Sextus Pompeius.
- Quintus Lucilius Balbus, probably the brother of the jurist, was a Stoic philosopher, and a student of Panaetius. He was much admired by Cicero, who uses him as an exponent in both De Natura Deorum and Hortensius.
- Lucilius Bassus, according to Cicero an author well known for his lack of literary merit. In a letter to Titus Pomponius Atticus, he writes of his panegyric upon Cato the Younger, "I am well pleased with my work, but so is Bassus Lucilius with his."
- Sextus Lucilius, military tribune in the army of Marcus Calpurnius Bibulus in 50 BC. He was slain at Mount Amanus.
- Lucius Lucilius (L. f. Balbus), probably the son of the jurist, served under Appius Claudius Pulcher in Cilicia. He is probably the same Lucilius who commanded the fleet of Publius Cornelius Dolabella in Cilicia, in 43 BC.
- Gaius Lucilius, a friend of Cicero and Milo.
- Lucilius, a partisan of Brutus, who fought at the Battle of Philippi. During the retreat, he pretended to be Brutus in order to save his friend. Struck by his self-sacrifice, Marcus Antonius pardoned Lucilius, and the two became fast friends.
- Marcus Lucilius Paetus, a military tribune in the time of Augustus. A tomb belonging to him and his sister, Lucilia Polla, was discovered in Rome, near the Villa Albani, in 1885. It is a round structure about thirty-four metres across, and believed to have been surmounted by a conical mound of earth seventeen metres high.
- Lucilius Longus, a senator, and a close friend of Tiberius. He was consul suffectus for the last six months of AD 7. When Augustus required the latter to withdraw to Rhodes, Lucilius was the only senator to accompany him. When he died in AD 23, Tiberius honoured him with a censor's funeral.
- Lucilius, a centurion killed in the Pannonian mutiny, AD 14. He was known as Cedo Alteram ("Fetch Me Another"), for his tendency to break his vitis during beatings.
- Lucilius Capito, procurator of Asia in AD 23. He was accused of corruption by the people of his province, and was tried in the Senate.
- Lucilia Polla, commemorated on a monument in the Santa Giulia museum at Brescia.
- Lucilius Junior, procurator of Sicily, was a friend and correspondent of the younger Seneca.
- Lucilius Bassus, commander of a cavalry squadron in AD 69 under Vitellius, who gave him command of the fleet at Ravenna and Misenum. Disappointed at not receiving command of the Praetorian Guard, he went over to Vespasian, to whom he delivered the fleet. Once established in power, Vespasian sent Bassus to pacify Campania.
- Sextus Lucilius Bassus, governor of Judaea from AD 71 to 72.

== See also ==
- list of Roman gentes

== Bibliography ==
- Marcus Tullius Cicero, Epistulae ad Atticum, Epistulae ad Familiares, De Oratore, Brutus, Pro Quinto Roscio Comoedo, De Natura Deorum, De Divinatione, Hortensius.
- Marcus Velleius Paterculus, Compendium of Roman History.
- Lucius Annaeus Seneca (Seneca the Younger), Epistulae Morales ad Lucilium (Moral Letters to Lucilius).
- Quintus Asconius Pedianus, Commentarius in Oratio Ciceronis Pro Milone (Commentary on Cicero's Oration Pro Milone).
- Decimus Junius Juvenalis, Satirae (Satires).
- Publius Cornelius Tacitus, Annales, Historiae.
- Plutarchus, Lives of the Noble Greeks and Romans.
- Appianus Alexandrinus (Appian), Bellum Civile (The Civil War).
- Lucius Cassius Dio Cocceianus (Cassius Dio), Roman History.
- Digesta seu Pandectae (The Digest).
- Jan Gruter, Inscriptiones Antiquae Totius Orbis Romani, Heidelberg (1603).
- Joseph Hilarius Eckhel, Doctrina Numorum Veterum (The Study of Ancient Coins, 1792–1798).
- Dictionary of Greek and Roman Biography and Mythology, William Smith, ed., Little, Brown and Company, Boston (1849).
- George Davis Chase, "The Origin of Roman Praenomina", in Harvard Studies in Classical Philology, vol. VIII (1897).
- Robert K. Sherk, "The Text of the Senatus Consultum De Agro Pergameno", in Greek, Roman, and Byzantine Studies, vol. 7, pp. 361–369 (1966).
