= Gaius Aquilius Gallus =

1st-century BCE Roman jurist

Gaius Aquilius Gallus was a jurist of the Aquillia gens of ancient Rome who lived in the 1st century BCE.

== Life ==
Of the details of his private life, little is known. Pliny the Elder wrote that Gallus was even more distinguished for the magnificent mansion which he possessed upon the Viminal Hill than for his knowledge of law. It was in this mansion, the most superb in all Rome, that his intimate friend, Publius Quintius Scapula, suddenly expired while at supper with Gallus.

In a letter addressed to the orator and jurist Servius Sulpicius Rufus in 46 BCE, Cicero speaks of a Gallus, a friend and relative of Servius, who lost a promising son, and bore his loss with equanimity, whom some suppose is the same as this Gallus; but though Gallus Aquillius, the jurist, was the friend and teacher of Servius, it is doubtful from the context whether he is the person referred to. In Cicero's work, Topica, a treatise which was published in 44 BCE, Gallus is spoken of in the past tense, as no longer living.

== Career ==
Gallus was one of the most distinguished of the early Roman jurists who flourished in the Roman Republic, just before the time of the Roman Empire. Born of an ancient and noble plebeian family, he applied himself to the study of Roman law, under the auspices of the jurist Quintus Mucius Scaevola Pontifex, one of the great legal minds of the ancient world, and he was himself the teacher of Servius Sulpicius Rufus, another of the great legal minds of the day.

Of all the many pupils of Mucius, Gallus attained the greatest authority. For deep and sound learning, perhaps some of his fellow-pupils, as Lucius Lucilius Balbus, Gaius Papirius, and Gaius Juventius, may have had equal or greater reputation among the members of their own profession; but they did not, like Gallus, exercise much influence on the progress of their art. He was an eques and senator.

At the end of the year 67 BCE, he was elected praetor along with the writer Cicero, and achieved many legal reforms. During his praetorship he presided in quaestiones de ambitu, while the jurisdiction in cases de pecuniis repetundis was assigned to his colleague.

He never aspired to the consulship, as his ambition was satisfied by the judicial sovereignty which he exercised. Moreover, he dreaded the additional toils of an office to which he felt his declining health unequal.

== Legal work ==
Gallus had a high reputation as a judge, and Cicero frequently appeared as an advocate when his friend sat on the bench. Already, in 81 BCE, the youthful orator pleaded the cause of Quintus Tullius Cicero before Gallus, and, a few years afterwards, Gallus was one of the judges on the trial of Aulus Caecina.

In the latter case, Cicero lavishes very high encomiums on his knowledge, ability, and industry, as well as his just and merciful disposition. The speech Pro Cluentio was addressed to Gallus as a judge. Cicero himself resorted for legal advice to his friend, although, in a question relating to water rights, he says that he preferred consulting Marcus Tugio, an otherwise unknown jurist who had devoted exclusive attention to that branch of the law.

Gallus, on the other hand, when he was consulted on questions which involved controverted facts rather than legal doubts, used to refer his clients for advice and assistance to Cicero, as the great orator and skillful advocate. It is possible that Gallus was deficient in oratorical power, as Cicero offers him no compliments on that competency.

Among the important causes which he heard was that of Otacilia, who had carried on an adulterous intrigue with Gaius Visellius Varro. Varro, being seriously ill, and wishing to make her a present, which, if he died, she might recover from his heirs as if from a debt, permitted her to charge against him in a settled account the sum of 300,000 sesterces, but, as he did not die so soon as she expected, she brought an action against himself to recover the amount with interest. This demand was rejected by Aquillius Gallus, who was appointed judge in the case.

== Legacy ==
In the time of 2nd century jurist Sextus Pomponius, some works of Aquillius Gallus survived, but copies of them were scarce.

Servius Sulpicius incorporated the works of Gallus, and of other disciples of Mucius, in his own writings, and, while he acknowledged his obligations to their work, he both rescued them from obscurity and at the same time deprived them of independent fame, by presenting himself as a perfecter of the style they promulgated. It is remarkable that today we do not know the titles of any of Gallus's works, though he is quoted often in the compendium of Roman legal writing known as the Digest.

By the time of the late-2nd/early-3rd century jurist Ulpian, we see Gallus cited secondhand in a quotation from Fabius Mela. He is similarly loosely quoted by Marcus Antistius Labeo, by Sextus Caecilius Africanus, by Quintus Cervidius Scaevola, by Licinius Rufinus, by Javolenus, by Florentinus, by Paulus, and by Ulpian. This unspecific mode of quotation shows that his original works were not generally available, and the same inference may be deduced from the silence of the old grammarians, who have nothing to say on the usage of words by citations from Aquillius Gallus.

His authority, however, is invoked by the 1st-century rhetorician Dionysius of Halicarnassus, for the statement that, on one occasion, when the sewers were out of repair, the censors agreed to pay 100 talents for their cleansing.
