= Titus Aufidius =

1st-century BCE Roman politician

Titus Aufidius was a jurist of ancient Rome, of the Aufidia gens. He was the brother of Marcus Virgilius, who accused Sulla in 86 BCE. It was probably this Titus Aufidius who was quaestor in 84 BCE, and who was afterwards praetor of the province of Asia.

He may also have been the same Aufidius once talked of as one of the writer Cicero's competitors for the consulship in 63 BCE.

In pleading private causes, he imitated the manner of Titus Juventius and his disciple, Publius Orbius, both of whom were sound lawyers and shrewd but unimpassioned speakers. Cicero, in whose lifetime he died at a very advanced age, mentions him rather slightingly as a good and harmless man, but no great orator.
