= Gaius Juventius =

1st-century BCE Roman jurist

Gaius Juventius was a jurist of the Juventia gens of ancient Rome who lived in the 1st century BCE.

He was one of the numerous students of Quintus Mucius Scaevola, the Pontifex Maximus. He is mentioned by the 2nd century jurist Sextus Pomponius -- along with Gaius Aquilius Gallus, Lucius Lucilius Balbus, and Gaius Papirius -- as one of the four most eminent pupils of Mucius.

Nothing more is known of him. His works were highly respected in their time, and possessed great authority, and were incorporated by Servius Sulpicius Rufus (student of Lucius Lucilius Balbus) into his own writings. In the time of Pomponius, the original productions of the disciples of Mucius were scarce, and were known chiefly through the books of Servius Sulpicius.
