= Licinia (disambiguation) =

Licinia is a Latin name and proper adjective that may refer to:

- Licinia (gens), the ancient Roman clan that used the family name Licinius for men
- Licinia, a name used by women of the gens Licinia
- Lex Licinia or Licinian Law, any ancient Roman law proposed by a member of the gens Licinia, including:
  - Lex Licinia Sextia, a 4th-century BC law that was supposed to reserve one of the two consulships for a man of plebeian status
  - Lex Licinia Mucia, a law of 95 BC addressing false claims of Roman citizenship
  - Lex Junia Licinia, a law of 62 BC pertaining to the people's assemblies
