= Titus Juventius =

1st-century BCE Roman jurist

Titus Juventius was a jurist of the Juventia gens of ancient Rome, who lived in the 1st century BCE.

Juventius was an advocate who was much employed in private causes. He was, according to ancient writers, a slow and rather cold speaker, but a wily disputant. He possessed considerable legal knowledge, as did also his disciple Publius Orbius, who was a contemporary of Cicero. The classical scholar Georg Alexander Ruperti thought that the similarly named jurist called Gaius Juventius by the Roman jurist Sextus Pomponius (but called "T. Juventius" by Cicero) was the same person as this "Titus Juventius".
