= De fato =

Philosophical treatise written by Cicero

De Fato
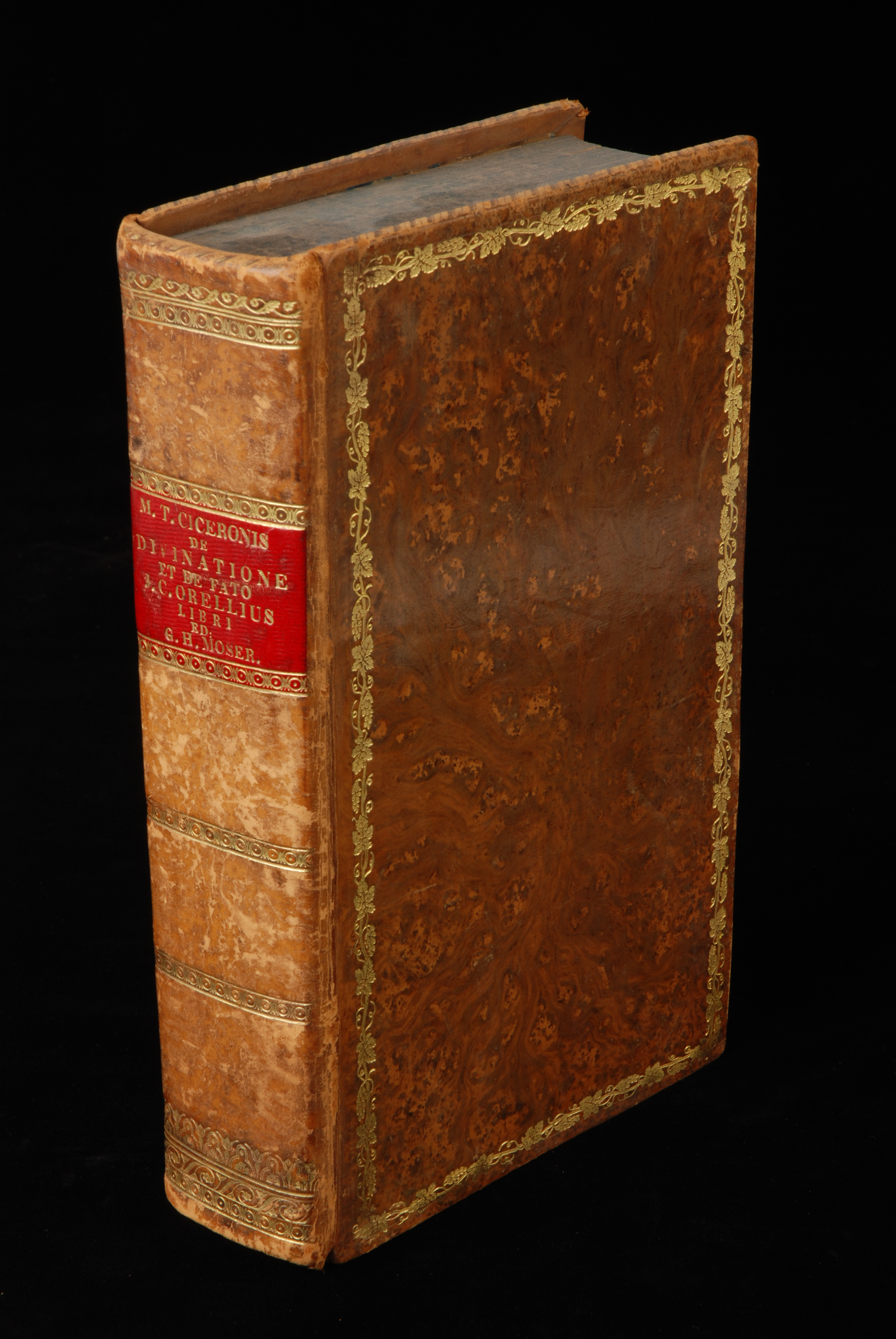
- Bound edition of De divinatione and De fato, 1828
- Author: Marcus Tullius Cicero
- Language: Latin
- Subject: Fate and free will
- Genre: Dialogue
- Publication date: 44 BC

De Fato (English: "Concerning Fate") is a partially lost philosophical treatise written by the Roman orator Cicero in 44 BC. Only two-thirds of the work exists; the beginning and ending are missing. It takes the form of a dialogue, although it reads more like an exposition, whose interlocutors are Cicero and his friend Aulus Hirtius.

In the work, Cicero analyzes the concept of Fate, and suggests that free will is a condition of Fate. Cicero, however, does not consciously deal with the distinction between fatalism and determinism.

It appears that De Fato is an appendix to the treatise on theology formed by the three books of De Natura Deorum and the two books of De Divinatione. These three books provide important information regarding Stoic cosmology and theology.

== History ==
De fato is part of the second group of Cicero's writings. The work was composed at Pozzuoli between April 17 and May 23 of 44 BC. In any case, the work would have most likely been completed prior to Cicero's abortive departure for Greece in July of that year. The work was written in haste, as Cicero was planning to return to the political arena.

== Argumentation ==
Hirtius notes that Cicero has adopted the Academic method of investigation: arguing against all propositions. Therefore, he outlines the positions of Democritus, Heraclitus, Empedocles, and Aristotle as those who maintained that everything happens by necessity. As such Cicero develops the propositions of fate and necessity as follows:

"If all things happen by fate, all things happen with an antecedent cause; and if this is true of desire, it is true also of what follows desire, and therefore true of assent. But if the cause of desire is not within us, desire itself is not in our power; and if this is so, then those things which are brought about by desire are not within us. Therefore neither assent nor action is in our power; and from this it follows that neither praise nor blame are just, nor honours nor punishment"

Cicero essentially dismisses this proposition as antithetical to what is observed, but postulates freedom as a necessity for moral life. Ultimately, Cicero maintains this position as he is emotionally convinced that it is in man's power to achieve virtue for himself; if determinism were the order of things, then such ability would not be true.

== See also ==
- De Natura Deorum
- De Divinatione
- Compatibilism
- Incompatibilism
- Destiny
- Alexander of Aphrodisias, who also wrote a treatise titled On Fate
