= Juventia gens =

Ancient Roman family

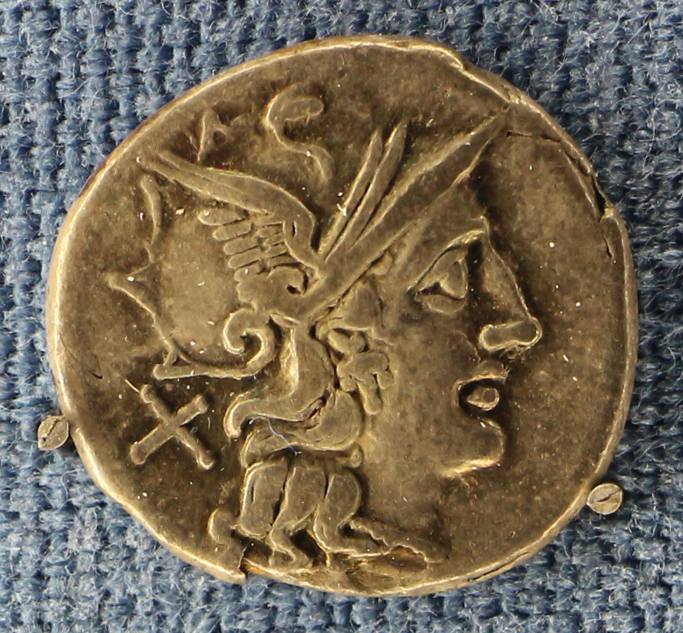
A denarius of Gaius Juventius Thalna, triumvir monetalis in 154 BC. The denomination is indicated by the 'X'.

The gens Juventia, occasionally written Jubentia, was an ancient plebeian family at Rome. After centuries of obscurity, the gens emerges into history with the appearance of Titus Juventius, a military tribune, in the beginning of the second century BC. The first of the Juventii to obtain the consulship was Marcus Juventius Thalna in 163 BC. But the family is renowned less for its statesmen than for its jurists, who flourished during the second century AD.

== Origin ==
The Juventii were said to have come to Rome from Tusculum, probably during the fourth century BC. Cicero reports a claim, which he regards as incorrect, that the first of the plebeian aediles was a Juventius, and in fact the Juventii are not mentioned until BC 197, although there is no reason to doubt that the family had already been at Rome for some generations. (Note: One of the scholiasts on Cicero has misinterpreted his description of the Juventii as "noble" to mean that they were originally patrician.) The nomen Juventius is certainly derived from the Latin juventas, "youth", personified by the goddess Juventas, but the family is probably of Etruscan origin, as the surname Thalna, borne by a number of the earliest Juventii, has the same meaning; Juventius is simply the Latin version of their original name.

== Praenomina ==
The earlier Juventii used the praenomina Titus, Lucius, Manius, Publius, and Gaius. From the first century BC we also find Marcus. All were very common names, except for Manius, which was used by many fewer families.

== Branches and cognomina ==
There were several families of the Juventii in the time of the Republic, with the surnames Celsus, Laterensis, Pedo, and Thalna. However, several Juventii are mentioned without any surname. Thalna, occasionally found as Talna, is an Etruscan name, and was probably the original nomen of the gens, before it came to be known as Juventia.

== Members ==
This list includes abbreviated praenomina. For an explanation of this practice, see filiation.

=== Juventii Thalnae ===
- Titus Juventius (Thalna?), a military tribune serving under the consul Quintus Minucius Rufus in BC 197. He was slain in battle against the Cisalpine Gauls.
- Titus Juventius Thalna, praetor peregrinus in 194 BC, was probably the same Titus Juventius who was sent to purchase corn from Apulia and Calabria in 172, for the war against Perseus.
- Lucius Juventius T. f. Thalna, legate of the praetor Gaius Calpurnius Piso in Spain, BC 185.
- Manius Juventius L. f. T. n. Thalna, (Note: The Dictionary of Greek and Roman Biography and Mythology expressly identifies Manius as the son of Lucius Juventius Thalna, the legate of Piso, and assigns him the filiation "L. f. T. n.", but Broughton gives "T. f. T. n." under 163 (without discussing his father). If correct, this would probably make Manius the son of either Titus, the praetor in 194, or Titus, the military tribune killed in 197. It is unlikely that the military tribune was the father of the praetor, as this tribuneship was usually filled by younger men, while a praetor was likely to be nearing forty.) tribune of the plebs in 170 BC, praetor in 167, and consul in 163. During his consulship, Thalna defeated and conquered the Corsicans, and was granted a supplicatio by the Senate, but he died shortly thereafter. (Note: "The senate in consequence voted him the honour of a thanksgiving; and he was so overcome with joy at the intelligence, which he received as he was offering a sacrifice, that he dropt down dead on the spot.")
- Publius Juventius Thalna, triumvir monetalis in 170 BC, and praetor in 149, he was defeated and slain by Andriscus in Macedon.
- Gaius Juventius P. f. Thalna, triumvir monetalis in 154 BC.
- Juventius Thalna, one of the judices assigned to try Publius Clodius Pulcher, was bribed by the defendant.
- Juventius Thalna, apparently a different man from the judex, is mentioned twice in Cicero's letters, first in 45 BC, and again the following year.

=== Juventii Celsi ===
- Juventius Celsus, a celebrated jurist during the latter part of the first century AD, and the father of the even more influential jurist Publius Juventius Celsus.
- Publius Juventius Celsus, one of the most influential of all the Roman jurists, flourished during the reigns of Nerva, Trajan, and Hadrian. He was twice consul, although the years are stated differently.
- Publius Juventius Celsus, consul in AD 164.

=== Juventii Laterenses ===
- Manius Juventius L. f. Laterensis, triumvir monetalis in 83 BC, and probably governor of Asia, circa 77.
- Marcus Juventius M'. f. L. n. Laterensis, a friend of Cicero and political opponent of Caesar, was quaestor in an uncertain year, and after several setbacks, obtained the praetorship in BC 51. After Caesar's murder, he was a legate of Marcus Aemilius Lepidus, and took his own life when Marcus Antonius entered Lepidus' camp.
- Lucius Juventius Laterensis, a legate under Quintus Cassius Longinus in Hispania Ulterior during the Civil War, was proclaimed praetor by the soldiers when they believed that Cassius had been put to death. But as Cassius escaped the assassins, he immediately ordered the execution of Laterensis, along with the conspirators.

=== Others ===
- Juventius, a comic poet mentioned by Varro and Aulus Gellius, probably lived about the middle of the second century BC.
- Gaius Juventius, a jurist who had been among the leading students of Quintus Mucius Scaevola. His opinions were highly respected, and were incorporated into the writings of Servius Sulpicius Rufus.
- Titus Juventius, a knowledgeable and clever advocate in the Roman courts. His disciple, Quintus Orbius, was a contemporary of Cicero, who describes Juventius' style as slow and rather cold, but wily.
- Marcus Juventius Pedo, a judex praised by Cicero.
- Juventius, a youth described as beautiful by Catullus, who addressed several poems to him.
- Juventius, first century bishop of Ticinum.

=== In literature ===
- Marius Juventius Thalna, (Note: Mario Juvencio Tala in the original Spanish. Marius was an Oscan praenomen, not generally used by Roman families, except as a nomen gentilicium.) a military tribune in Santiago Posteguillo's trilogy of novels about Scipio Africanus. An apparent homage to Manius Juventius Thalna.

== See also ==
- List of Roman gentes

== Bibliography ==
- Gaius Valerius Catullus Carmina.
- Marcus Tullius Cicero, Pro Plancio, Brutus, Epistulae ad Atticum, Epistulae ad Familiares, In Vatinium Testem, Pro Cluentio.
- Aulus Hirtius (attributed), De Bello Alexandrino.
- Marcus Terentius Varro, De Lingua Latina (On the Latin Language).
- Titus Livius (Livy), History of Rome.
- Valerius Maximus, Factorum ac Dictorum Memorabilium (Memorable Facts and Sayings).
- Gaius Plinius Secundus (Pliny the Elder), Historia Naturalis (Natural History).
- Florus, Epitome de T. Livio Bellorum Omnium Annorum DCC (Epitome of Livy: All the Wars of Seven Hundred Years).
- Appianus Alexandrinus (Appian), Bellum Civile (The Civil War).
- Eutropius, Breviarium Historiae Romanae (Abridgement of the History of Rome).
- Aulus Gellius, Noctes Atticae (Attic Nights).
- Lucius Cassius Dio, Roman History.
- Marcus Velleius Paterculus, Compendium of Roman History.
- Julius Obsequens, Liber de Prodigiis (The Book of Prodigies).
- Paulus Orosius, Historiarum Adversum Paganos (History Against the Pagans).
- Digesta seu Pandectae (The Digest).
- Scholia Bobiensa (Bobbio Scholiast), Pro Plancio.
- Dictionary of Greek and Roman Biography and Mythology, William Smith, ed., Little, Brown and Company, Boston (1849).
- George Davis Chase, "The Origin of Roman Praenomina", in Harvard Studies in Classical Philology, vol. VIII (1897).
- T. Robert S. Broughton, The Magistrates of the Roman Republic, American Philological Association (1952).
- Ronald Syme, "Missing Senators", Historia: Zeitschrift für Alte Geschichte, Bd. 4, H. 1, pp. 52–71 (1955).
- Michael Crawford, Roman Republican Coinage, Cambridge University Press (1974, 2001).
