= Gaius Vergilius Balbus =

Gaius Vergilius Balbus (fl. 62-57 BC) was a Roman magistrate and promagistrate who was politically active during the closing decades of the Roman Republic, and was a known associate of Marcus Tullius Cicero.

== Biography ==
Part of the gens Vergilia, Gaius Vergilius Balbus was born around the same time as Cicero (106 BC), by whom he is described as "united by age". Having served as a Praetor in 62 BC, Balbus went on to serve as Propraetor in Sicily from 61-58 BC., and refused to host Cicero during his political exile in 58 BC out of fear of repercussion from Publius Clodius Pulcher. Balbus is then recorded serving as a Legate under Lucius Calpurnius Piso Caesoninus in Macedonia in 57 BC, after which he disappears from the historical record.

== Bibliography ==
- Broughton, T. Robert S. (1952). The Magistrates of the Roman Republic II (PDF). American Philogical Association.
- Cicero, Pro Plancio
- Cicero, De Provinciis Consularibus
