= Lucius Lucilius Balbus =

1st-century BCE Roman jurist

Lucius Lucilius Balbus was a jurist of the Lucilia gens of ancient Rome who lived in the 1st century BCE.

Balbus was one of the four notable pupils of the jurist Quintus Mucius Scaevola Pontifex, and one of the legal instructors of Servius Sulpicius Rufus, the eminent lawyer and distinguished friend of the writer Cicero, who was said to have clearly surpassed his teacher.

He was probably the father of the Lucilius who was the companion of Appius Pulcher in Cilicia, and the brother of Quintus Lucilius Balbus, the Stoic philosopher. Cicero speaks of both the two Balbi as Stoics. The 18th century jurist Johann Gottlieb Heineccius, among others, proposed that the jurist Lucius has been confounded with Quintus the Stoic philosopher, and that it was just Quintus who was the Stoic philosopher and not Lucius.

The jurist was occasionally quoted in the works of Sulpicius; and, in the time of the 2nd century jurist Sextus Pomponius, his writings were on the verge of being lost, and either did not exist in a separate form, or, at least, were in the hands of few. In giving advice and pleading causes his manner was slow and deliberate.
