= Marcus Virgilius =

1st-century BCE Roman politician

Marcus Virgilius was a nobleman of the 1st century BCE of ancient Rome, of the Vergilia gens. He was the brother or first cousin of Titus Aufidius, served as tribune of the plebs in 87 BCE, when, at the instigation of the consul Cinna, he brought an accusation against Sulla, when the latter was on the point of crossing over to Greece to conduct the war against Mithridates VI Eupator; but Sulla left Rome without paying any attention to Virgilius or his accusation.

He is called "Virginius" by the historian Plutarch.
