= Vergilia gens =

Roman gens

The Vergilia gens (or Virgilia) was a Roman gens.

The gens probably originates from Campania, being closely associated with the Magia gens. The name closely resembles Vergiliae, the Latin name for the Pleiades, although no direct etymology is known. Scholars have speculated that the name is originally Celtic, but there is little direct evidence to support this.

The gens Vergilia was spread throughout Italy, attested in Verona, Aquileia, Cremona, and Brescia.

== Members ==
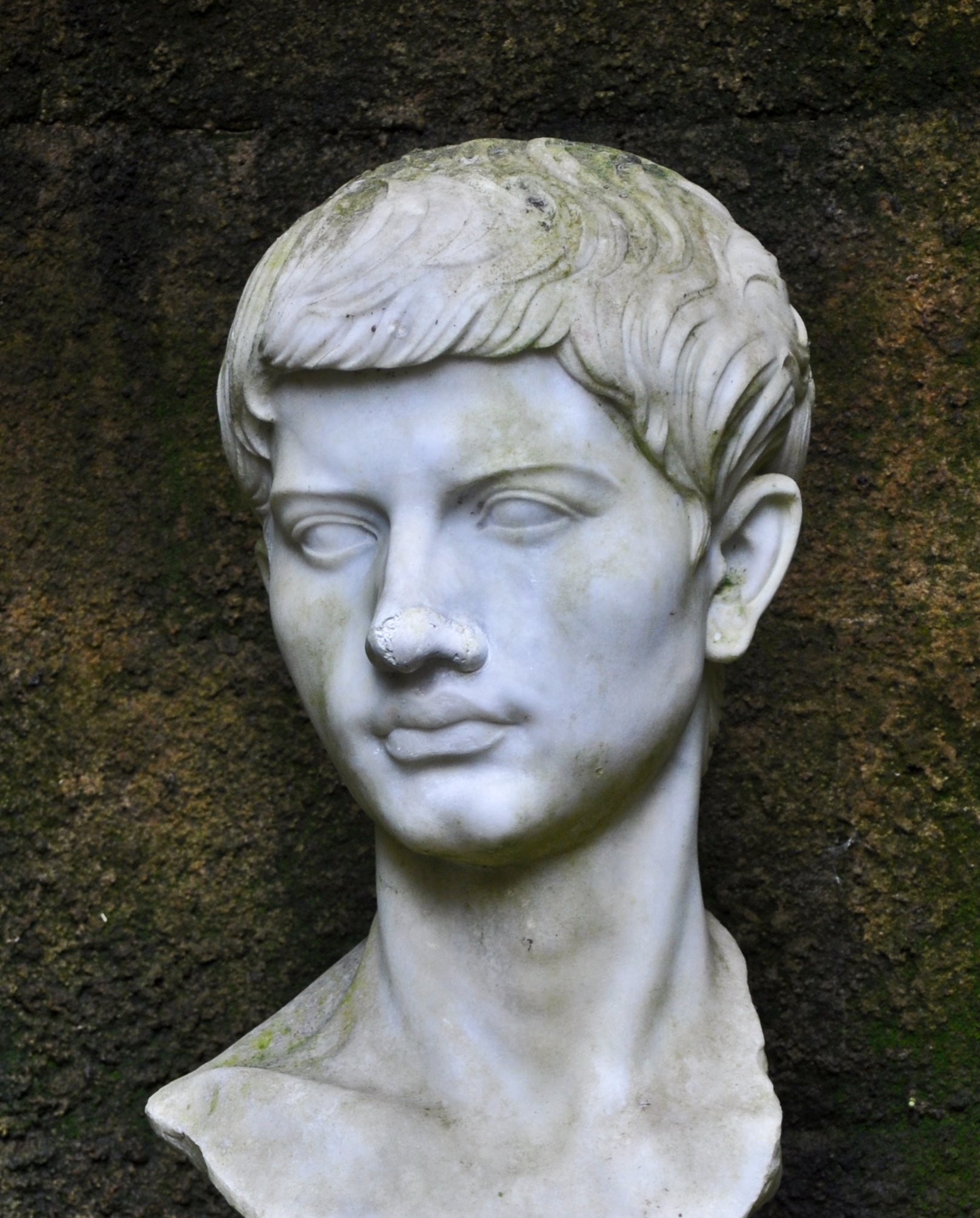
Bust of Virgil at the entrance to his crypt in Naples

- Marcus Virgilius: Tribune of the plebs in 87 BC, initiated legal proceedings against Sulla at the instigation of Cinna.
- Gaius Vergilius Balbus: praetor in 62 BC, propraetor in Sicily in 61 BC
- Marcus Vergilius Eurysaces, freedman and former slave of the 1st century BCE interred in the Tomb of Eurysaces the Baker
- Publius Virgilius Maro: poet, born on 15 October 70 BC
