= Publius Orbius =

1st-century BCE Roman jurist

Publius Orbius was a jurist of the Orbia gens of ancient Rome who lived in the 1st century BCE. He was a contemporary of Cicero, and a disciple of the jurist Titus Juventius. Cicero wrote that Orbius was an inexperienced speaker, but had knowledge of civil law equal to his master's. Cicero also writes that the jurist Titus Aufidius imitated his style.
