= Hortensius (Cicero) =

Lost philosophical work by Cicero

- Author: Cicero
- Language: Classical Latin
- Genre: Philosophy
- Publication date: 45 BC
- Publication place: Roman Republic
- Preceded by: Paradoxa Stoicorum
- Followed by: Academica

Hortensius (Latin: [hɔrˈtẽːsi.ʊs]) or On Philosophy is a lost dialogue written by Marcus Tullius Cicero in the year 45 BC. The dialogue—which is named after Cicero's friendly rival and associate, (Note: Cicero's sentiments regarding Hortensius were made clear in his oratory Brutus, in which he declares, "I grieved to have lost in [Hortensius] not, as some may have thought, a rival jealous of my forensic reputation, but rather a friend, and a fellow worker in the same field of glorious endeavour ... each of us was helped by the other with exchange of suggestions, admonitions, and friendly offices.") the speaker and politician Quintus Hortensius Hortalus—took the form of a protreptic. In the work, Cicero, Hortensius, Quintus Lutatius Catulus, and Lucius Licinius Lucullus discuss the best use of one's leisure time. At the conclusion of the work, Cicero argues that the pursuit of philosophy is the most important endeavor.

While the dialogue was extremely popular in Classical Antiquity, the dialogue only survived into the sixth century AD before it was lost. Today, it is extant in the fragments preserved by the prose writer Martianus Capella, the grammarians Maurus Servius Honoratus and Nonius Marcellus, the early Christian author Lactantius, and the Church Father Augustine of Hippo (the latter of whom explicitly credits the Hortensius with encouraging him to study the tenets of philosophy).

== History and composition ==
=== Biographical background ===
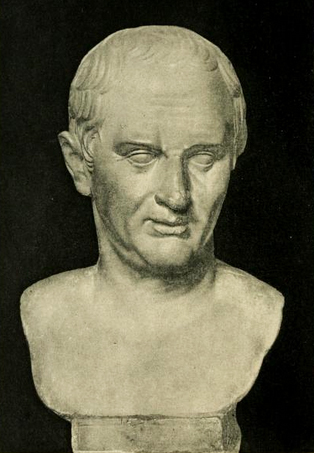
Marcus Tullius Cicero, the author of the now-lost Hortensius.

Just before composing the Hortensius, Cicero experienced many hardships. Politically, Gaius Julius Caesar became both dictator and consul in 46 BC, and was subverting elements of the Roman Senate, of which the decidedly republican Cicero was a fervent supporter. Personally, Cicero divorced his wife Terentia in 46 BC, and in 45 BC he married Publilia, a rich young girl in his ward, although the marriage quickly fell apart. Then, in February 45 BC, Cicero's daughter, Tullia, whom he loved greatly, died after giving birth.

Both his political and personal misfortunes shook him to his core, with the death of his daughter being most disturbing; in a letter to his friend Titus Pomponius Atticus, he wrote, "I have lost the one thing that bound me to life." Cicero soon found that the only thing which enabled him to get on with life was reading and writing, and so he retreated to his villa at Astura, where he isolated himself and composed the Hortensius. (Around this time, he also composed several other works relating to philosophy, including: the Academica, De finibus bonorum et malorum, the Tusculanae Disputationes, De Natura Deorum, and the now also lost Consolatio.)

=== Style ===
Cicero's exhortation was the advice "not to study one particular sect but to love and seek and pursue and hold fast and strongly embrace wisdom itself, wherever found."

— Fragment of Hortensius found in Augustine of Hippo's Confessions

According to the Constantinian writer Trebellius Pollio, Cicero wrote the Hortensius "in the model of [a] protrepticus" (Marcus Tullius in Hortensio, quem ad exemplum protreptici scripsit). Some scholars, such as Ingram Bywater, have argued that this is proof that Cicero based his work on Aristotle's Protrepticus, whereas others, like W. G. Rabinowitz, argue it simply meant that Cicero wrote in the general protreptic style. Either way, scholars tend to classify the Hortensius as a protreptic dialogue (that is "hortatory literature that calls the audience to a new and different way of life") based on Greek models.

Cicero seems to have heavily emphasized the ethical nature of philosophy in the Hortensius, seeing the field as a "pragmatic and utilitarian science ... deal[ing] with questions of life." This approach suggests that Cicero was inspired by Stoic thought, like the philosopher Aristo of Chios. Other sources for the work include Aristotle and Plato, as well as the writings of the Epicurean and Peripatetic schools, and the Platonic Academy.

=== Contents ===
According to Michael Foley, in the Hortensius, "Cicero attempts to persuade Quintus Hortensius Hortalus ... known for his defense of corrupted provincial governors, of the superiority of philosophy to sophistical rhetoric in facilitating genuine human happiness." The work takes place at either the Tusculum or Cumaen villa of Lucius Licinius Lucullus, and is set sometime in the mid-to-early 60s BC (Note: Taylor argues for the very specific date of 62 BC. MacKendrick argues for a slightly wider range of 61–60 BC. Mihai proposes the widest range: 65–60 BC.) during an unnamed feria (that is, an ancient Roman holiday). At the start of the dialogue, Lucullus welcomes his brother-in-law Hortensius as well as his friends Quintus Lutatius Catulus and Cicero to his house, and they begin to talk with one another.

This discussion quickly becomes one about otium (Latin for leisure), which Hortensius describes as "not those things which demand a great intellectual effort" (non quibus intendam rebus animum), but rather "those through which the mind can ease and rest" (sed quibus relaxem ac remittam). Catulus says that he likes to read literature during free time. Lucullus critiques this opinion, arguing that the study of history is the best use of otium. Hortensius then declares that oratory is the greatest of the arts. Catulus counters by reminding Hortensius of the boons philosophy grants. Hortensius dismisses this idea, arguing that philosophy "explains one ambiguity by another." Cicero then inserts himself into the discussion, arguing "as earnestly as [he can] for the study of philosophy".

=== Relation to Aristotle's Protrepticus ===
[Cicero] in the Hortensius: If one reads Aristotle, a great effort of mind is required to undo his complexities.

— Nonius Marcellus quoting Cicero

Conventionally, it is held that in writing his Hortensius, Cicero made use of Aristotle's Protrepticus. This work—which inspired its readers to appreciate a philosophical approach to life—was one of the most famous and influential books of philosophy in the ancient world (although it was later lost during the Middle Ages).

The German philologist Jakob Bernays was the first scholar to suggest that the Protrepticus inspired Cicero. He thus suggested that the Hortensius should be used as the foundation by which the Protrepticus could be reconstructed. In 1869, the English classical scholar Ingram Bywater agreed that Cicero had adapted the outline of the Protrepticus for his dialogue. In 1888, working off Bywater and the German philologist Hermann Usener, the classicist Hermann Alexander Diels found a fragment of Hortensius in the Soliloquies of Augustine that seemed to connect with a section in a fragment of the Protrepticus. This, he contended, was additional proof that Cicero depended upon Aristotle.

This hypothesis is not without its detractors. In 1957, W. G. Rabinowitz argued that the Hortensius was not based strictly on the Protrepticus but was rather written in the general hortatory and protreptic style then "much in vogue", as the philosopher and historian Anton-Hermann Chroust puts it. In 2015, James Henderson Collins wrote that "the relationship between Aristotle's Protrepticus and Cicero's Hortensius remains elusive".

== Legacy ==
The book changed my feelings. It altered my prayers, Lord, to be towards yourself. It gave me different values and priorities.

— Augustine of Hippo on Hortensius

The Hortensius was renowned and popular in early and late antiquity, and it likely inspired a number of Roman thinkers, like the silver age authors Seneca the Younger and Tacitus, the early Christian writer Lactantius, and the early medieval philosopher Boethius. At the onset of the Christian era, the Hortensius was also studied in schools. It was in this way that, while studying rhetoric in Carthage, a young Augustine of Hippo read the Hortensius. The work moved him deeply, and in both his Confessions and De beata vita he wrote that the book engendered in him an intense interest in philosophy and encouraged him to pursue wisdom.

But while it was popular for a time, the Hortensius survived only until around the sixth century AD, after which it was lost. Today, a little over 100 (Note: Laila Straume-Zimmermann (1976) writes that we have about 130, whereas Albertus Grilli (1962) contends that only 115 survive. Michel Ruch (1958) is even more conservative when he argues that only 94 fragments can be identified with certainty.) fragments of the book survive, preserved in the works of Augustine, Martianus Capella, Lactantius, Nonius Marcellus, and Servius. Of these writers, Nonius Marcellus preserves the most, although the classicist and religious scholar John Hammond Taylor argues that these snippets are "extremely brief and very difficult to place in a context". The 16 fragments preserved by Augustine, on the other hand, are of "greater length and [thus] considerable interest".

== Scholarship ==
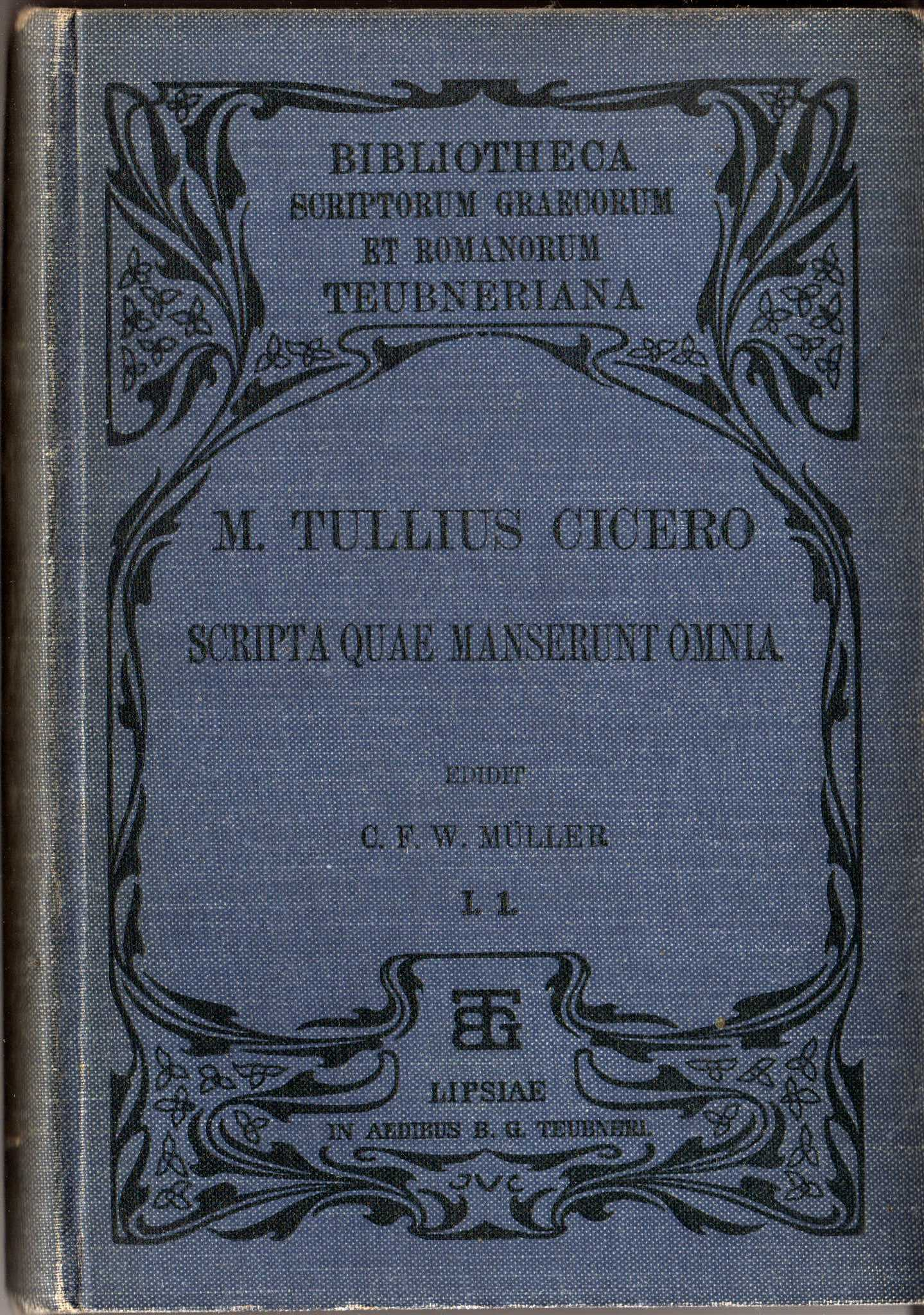
The cover the 1908 Teubner edition of Cicero's complete works. This volume contained the first standard critical edition of the Hortensius fragments.

The first standard critical edition of the Hortensius fragments were included the Teubner edition of Cicero (Pt. IV, Vol. III), edited by C. F. W. Mueller and released in 1890. In 1892, Otto Plasberg wrote a dissertation on the fragments in which he hypothesized as to the order to the fragments. In 1958, Michel Ruch authored a fifty-three-page thesis on the Hortensius that explored its influences, composition date, structure, subsequent impact, and disappearance. Ruch's work also reorganizes the fragments and provides each one with a French translation and commentary. In 1962, Alberto Grilli produced Hortensius, the current standard edition for citation.

== Bibliography ==
- Augustine (2007). Michael Foley (ed.). Confessions. Indianapolis, IN: Hackett Publishing. ISBN 978-1-60384-571-7.
- Chroust, Anton-Hermann (1973). Aristotle: New Light on His Life and On Some of His Lost Works. Vol. 2. Abingdon-on-Thames, UK: Routledge. ISBN 978-1-317-38066-5.
- Cicero (1877). Yonge, Charles Duke (ed.). Cicero's Tusculan Disputations. New York City, NY: Harper and Brothers. OCLC 1067053642.
- Cicero (1958). Ruch, Michel (ed.). L'Hortensius de Cicéron; histoire et reconstitution [The Hortensius of Cicero: A History and Reconstruction] (in French). Paris, France: Les Belles Lettres. OCLC 163771943.
- Cicero (1962). Grilli, Alberto (ed.). Hortensius. Milan, Italy: Istituto Editoriale Cisalpino. OCLC 715412454.
- Clayton, Edward (n.d.). "Cicero (106—43 B.C.E.) | Hortensius". Internet Encyclopedia of Philosophy.
- Collins, James Henderson (2015). Exhortations to Philosophy: The Protreptics of Plato, Isocrates, and Aristotle. Oxford, UK: Oxford University Press. ISBN 978-0-19-935859-5.
- Dacre Balson, John P.V.; Ferguson, John (January 11, 2018). "Marcus Tullius Cicero". Encyclopædia Britannica.
- Eder, Walter; Strothmann, Meret (2006). "Tullia". In Hubert Cancik; Helmuth Schneider; Christine F. Salazar; Manfred Landfester; Francis G. Gentry (eds.). Brill's New Pauly, Antiquity Volumes. doi:10.1163/1574-9347_bnp_e1222290. ISBN 9789004122598. Archived from the original on July 8, 2019.(subscription required)
- Fitzgerald, Allan, ed. (1999). Augustine Through the Ages: An Encyclopedia. Grand Rapids, MI: William B. Eerdmans Publishing Company. ISBN 978-0-8028-3843-8.
- Gagarin, Michael, ed. (2010). "Philosophy of Cicero". The Oxford Encyclopedia of Ancient Greece and Rome. Vol. 1. Oxford, UK: Oxford University Press. pp. 135–41. ISBN 978-0-19-517072-6.
- Haskell, H. J. (1942). This Was Cicero. New York City, NY: Alfred A. Knopf.
- Hutchinson, D.S; Johnson, Monte, eds. (2017). Aristotle: Protrepticus or Exhortation to Philosophy (Citations, Fragments, Paraphrases, and Other Evidence) (PDF).
- MacKendrick, Paul (1989). The Philosophical Books of Cicero. Duckworth. ISBN 978-0-7156-2214-8.
- Mihai, C. (2014). "Reconstructing Cicero's Hortensius: A Note on Fragment 43 Grilli". Philologica Jassyensia. 10 (1/19): 451–56. Supplement.
- Muller, Philippe (1990). Cicéron: un philosophe pour notre temps [Cicero: A Philosopher for Our Time] (in French). Lausanne, Switzerland: Éditions L'Age d'Homme. ISBN 9782825100332.
- Rabinowitz, W. G. (1957). Aristotle's Protrepticus and the Sources of its Reconstruction. University of California Publications in Classical Philology. Oakland, CA: University of California Press. OCLC 434782818.
- Russell, Robert P. (1976). "Cicero's Hortensius and the Problem of Riches in Saint Augustine". Augustinian Studies. 7: 59–68. doi:10.5840/augstudies197674.
- Salisbury, Joyce E. (2001). Encyclopedia of Women in the Ancient World. Santa Barbara, CA: ABC-CLIO. ISBN 978-1-57607-092-5.
- Stowers, Stanley K. (1986). Letter Writing in Greco-Roman Antiquity. Louisville, Kentucky: Westminster John Knox. ISBN 978-0-664-25015-7.
- Strauss, Barry (2016). The Death of Caesar: The Story of History's Most Famous Assassination. New York City, NY: Simon and Schuster. ISBN 978-1-4516-6881-0.
- Taylor, John Hammond (1960). "Review of L'Hortensius De Ciceron: Histoire Et Reconstitution". The American Journal of Philology. 81 (1): 94–99. doi:10.2307/291767. JSTOR 291767.
- Taylor, John Hammond (1963). "St. Augustine and the 'Hortensius' of Cicero". Studies in Philology. 60 (3): 487–498. JSTOR 4173424.
- Treggiari, Susan (2007). Terentia, Tullia and Publilia: The Women of Cicero's Family. London, UK: Routledge. ISBN 978-1-134-26456-8.
