= Lex Licinia Mucia =

Ancient Roman law

The lex Licinia Mucia was a Roman law which set up a quaestio to investigate Latin and Italian allies registered as Romans on the citizen rolls. It was established by consuls Lucius Licinius Crassus and Quintus Mucius Scaevola Pontifex in 95 BC. This law is regarded as a cause of the Social War (91–88 BC).

== Causes of the creation of the law ==
The emerging trend of xenophobia in the 2nd and 1st centuries BC led to the increasing marginalisation of Italians who, as Rome's primary fighters and tax payers, sought partnership and not subjection. Attempts to grant rights to surrounding allies had been continually thwarted in the past. In the mid-2nd century Gaius Gracchus had attempted to grant rights to Latin allies:

He also called on the Latin allies to demand the full rights of Roman citizenship, since the Senate could not with decency refuse this privilege to men who were of the same race. To the other allies, who were not allowed to vote in Roman elections, he sought to give the right of suffrage, in order to have their help in the enactment of laws which he had in contemplation. The Senate was very much alarmed at this.

The result of this attempt was the active opposition of the aristocracy and Gaius's subsequent suicide or murder and the mutilation of his body. Alongside the Gracchi's revolutionary re-evaluation of land ownership, which sought to take land over 500 jugera out the hands of the Roman elite and into those of the urban poor, this new use of the Tribunate raised questions about citizens' rights. What did it mean to be a citizen? What was the relationship between citizenship and elite power? Lucius Appuleius Saturninus and Gaius Servilius Glaucia tried to reintroduce the Gracchi legislation but their acts were also shut down and they were lynched.

The clear difference in rights between the Romans and the allies were brought to the forefront of social and political debate after the Cimbrian War where Italian allies contributed significantly to the Roman victory. In the aftermath, Gaius Marius granted citizenship to those Italian soldiers leading to a surge of new questions regarding national identity. Plutarch provides an account of Marius's leadership in the Cimbrian Wars and his attitude towards the Italians:

And yet we are told that when he had bestowed citizenship upon as many as a thousand men of Camerinum for conspicuous bravery in the war, the act was held to be illegal and was impeached by some; to whom he replied that the clash of arms had prevented his hearing the voice of the law. However, he appeared to be in greater fear and terror of the shouting in the popular assemblies. At any rate, while in war he had authority and power because his services were needed, yet in civil life his leadership was more abridged, and he therefore had recourse to the goodwill and favour of the multitude, not caring to be the best man if only he could be the greatest. The consequence was that he came into collision with all the aristocrats.

This is yet another instance in which the rising debates surrounding the rights of the Italians to Roman citizenship had come to cause dissent amongst aristocrats who disregarded a successful general's attempt to represent the rights of his soldiers.

There were legal also precedents for the creation of the lex Licinia Mucia. One such example was the Lex Cornelia of Sulla which took Roman rights from Italian communities. The lex Claudia of 177 BC similarly took Roman rights from Latin groups by declaring that anyone who was, or his parents were, citizens of an allied community in the censorship of M. Claudius and T. Quinctius must return to that community before the first of November:

Then C. Claudius, with the authorization of the senate, proposed a law concerning the allies and decreed that all allies [and members] of the Latin name, who themselves or whose ancestors had been registered among the allies (and) Latin name in the censorship of M. Claudius and T. Quinctius or thereafter should all return, each to his own state, before the Kalends of November. The investigation of those who should not have returned was decreed to L. Mummius the praetor.

Cicero in his De Oratore, however, references a particular event which possibly caused the direct creation of the law:

Often a verse is thrown in humorously, either as it is or slightly changed, or part of a verse, as a verse of Statius was by Scaurus when he was angry; from which some say that your law about the citizenship, Crassus, was born: ‘Shh! Quiet! What is this row? You who have neither mother nor father, such assurance? Be off with that pride of yours.

Here, Cicero is saying that there are some who believe that the consul Lucius Licinius Crassus was inspired by Marcus Aemilius Scaurus (consul 115 BC) who quotes Statius. The cause of Scaurus's angry quotation was possibly the trial of Gaius Norbanus (a newly made Roman citizen) when a crowd of non-citizen allies had gathered at Rome to watch his trial, at which point Scaurus snapped at the crowd to quiet down using Statius's oration. Tweedie argues that the mere annoyance of these allies would not have been enough to inspire the creation of the lex Licinia Mucia. Additionally, the law would not provide an immediate remedy to the problem of the rowdy ally crowd, as the law was not one of expulsion but one of investigation. This mention of the creation of the lex Licinia Mucia by Cicero demonstrates that the law was really directed at a specific group of non-citizens who disrupted an aristocrat's public speech, something which Scaurus felt to be an intrusion on his rights as an elite Roman citizen. Another example of the growing tensions between elite Romans and non-Romans. Nevertheless, this passage is cited as a possible event in which the creation of the law was inspired.

== Crassus and Scaevola ==
The lex Licinia Mucia was enacted in the year 95 BC. The Consuls for the year 95 were Lucius Licinius Crassus and Quintus Mucius Scaevola and it was they who gave their names to the lex Licinia Mucia. These two had served as colleagues throughout the various offices in their progression in the cursus honorum, culminating in their Consulship.

L. Licinius Crassus was by the time of his Consulship already renowned as an orator. During the course of his rise through Roman public life he had used his oratory skills to speak in support of conservative causes. When the Consul Quintus Servilius Caepio sought to legislate to allow members of the Senate to serve on juries, thereby ending the monopoly of the equestrian class, Crassus made a speech so fiery in support of the lex Servilla that it was considered an exemplar of Roman oratory. Cicero himself highly regarded and studied it. Subsequent to his term as consul, Crassus was elected as Censor. In this capacity he made a strong stand against Latin rhetors, teachers of rhetoric. This has been seen as a further bias against the Roman allies. The rhetors were possible sources of Latin agitation within Rome itself and earned Crassus’ ire for providing what he considered training inadequate for the future leaders of Rome.

Before his death in 91 BC Crassus had modified his position on Roman citizenship in so far at least that he appeared to concede its practical necessity, provided a proper legal framework was in place.

The second man responsible for the lex Licinia Mucia, Quintus Mucius Scaevola, became, in the years following the Consulship of 95, the governor of the Roman Asia province. He then was elected to the prestigious office of pontifex maximus only to die in the civil unrest of 82 BC.

== Operation of the law ==
The lex Licinia Mucia was not a law of expulsion or execution. Cicero outlines that the law did not require permanent evacuation from the city of Rome, rather, it banned non-citizens from acting as Roman citizens:

They, too, do wrong who prevent foreigners from the enjoyment of a city and expel them, as Pennus did in the time of our fathers and Papius more recently. For it is right not to allow one who is not a citizen to conduct himself as a citizen; the very wise Crassus and Scaevola passed such a law. To ban foreigners from a city, however, is contrary to humanity.

The law likely required that allies had to re-register themselves into their allied community unless they could provide evidence of his Roman citizenship. Those who did not re-register were liable for investigation by the censors. Cicero's Pro Balbo provides the only example of a prosecution under the Lex Licinia Mucia:

For T. Matrinius of Spoletium, one of those to whom C. Marius had given citizenship, was prosecuted, being from a Latin colony among the first for reliability and reputation.

In this case, Matrinius of Spoletium was being used by Cicero as anecdotal evidence to defend Pompey's grant of citizenship to Lucius Cornelius Balbus, just as Marius gave citizenship to Matrinius. Cicero tells us that L. Antistius had prosecuted the defendant for having been given citizenship under the Lex Appuleia of Saturninus which only granted the privilege of Roman citizenship to three members of each conquered colony. According to Antistius the colonies had not actually been founded, thus Matrinius should not receive citizenship. Matrinius’ prosecution under the lex Licinia Mucia would likely have been brought about due to his refusal to re-submit his name to the citizen rolls of Spoletium, thus bringing himself to the attention of Antistius who could question what criteria Matrinius possessed that was allowing him to identify as a Roman citizen. The censors thus investigated the case and he was brought before the law courts to be prosecuted. In this trial, Cicero has employed his characteristic oratorical tact by mentioning the law as a means of destabilising Crassus and Scaevola's relationship with Marius, whom they were friends with, by using their law against him. Thus, whilst the law operated in practical terms of legal prosecution, it was also used as a rhetorical device, particularly by Cicero, to criticise the scrutiny of citizenship.

These censorial investigations at the time of the lex Licinia Mucia were widely hated and caused agitation amongst allies. Diodorus Siculus provides an anecdote of such irritation:

The Marsic leader Pompaedius embarked on a grandiose and fantastic venture. assembling ten thousand men drawn from the ranks of those who had occasion to fear judicial investigations, he led them to Rome, with swords concealed beneath their garb of peace. It was his intention to surround the senate with armed men and demand the citizenship or, if persuasion failed, to ravage the seat of empire with fire and sword.

This fear of judicial investigations created an air of paranoia as the censors checked to make sure that the correct names were on the Roman citizen rolls after the introduction of the Lex Licinia Mucia; making certain that no one has re-enrolled who was not born in Rome. The operation of the law caused increased tensions amongst the socii who "were gripped by a great desire for the Roman citizenship". especially after their collaborative role in the Cimbric War.

In past cases relating to citizenship, the common punishment for false identity had been flogging, as attested by Pliny and Livy. The humiliation that flogging imposed upon the victim, especially one forced to leave Rome, suggests that this act was a possible punishment for those transgressing the lex Licinia Mucia.

== Aftermath ==
The law is quoted by Asconius as being a central cause of the Social War (91–88 BC) that occurred in the years after its introduction. "The feelings of the leaders of the Italic peoples were so alienated by this law that it was even the main reason for the bellum Italicum that broke out three years later."

The agitation of the Italians was briefly suspended in 91 BC when the tribune, Marcus Livius Drusus, introduced new laws that granted citizenship to the Italian allies who subsequently swore an oath of allegiance to him; the oath is recorded by Diodorus Siculus. However, his subsequent failure to follow through on his promises led to his assassination by his frustrated Italian followers. This murder was born from the long history of tensions between Romans and allies and was the cause of the first Italian revolt that led to the Bellum Italicum. The Lex Licinia Mucia, according to Asconius, was instrumental in accelerating their dissatisfaction.

== See also ==
- Crisis of the Roman Republic
