= Licinius Rufinus =

Roman Imperial official, senator and jurist

Marcus Gnaeus Licinius Rufinus (Ancient Greek: Μ. Γναῖος Λικίνιος Ῥουφεῖνος fl. ca. 210–240) was a Roman Imperial official, senator and jurist from Thyateira in Lydia. He held a number of secretarial posts for the emperor, served as governor of Noricum, and was one of the twenty senators who led the resistance against Maximinus Thrax's invasion of Italy in 238 AD. He is known from extracts of his legal work, Regulae and from honorific inscriptions erected for him in Thyateira, Thessaloniki, and Beroea.

== Life ==
Rufinus was born in Thyateira in Lydia perhaps in the mid-180s AD. Thus, like many Roman jurists of the third century AD, he was culturally Greek. His double praenomen may indicate that he was descended from Italian settlers. He must have studied Roman law and learnt Latin, but it is unclear where or how he did this.

=== Imperial career ===
He began his career in Imperial service as an equestrian, probably in the reign of Caracalla (211-217 AD). His earliest known office is as consiliarius Augusti, a member of the council which provided day-to-day advice to the emperor. He was appointed Ab epistulis graecis, the official responsible for Imperial correspondence in Greek, and then A studiis Augusti (Imperial tutor). Then he served as A rationibus (secretary of finance). After this he was probably A libellis (or perhaps a responsis), the emperor's legal secretary, who processed petitions submitted to the emperor and drafted the Imperial replies. On the basis of stylistic similarities with Rufinus' legal writings, Fergus Millar tentatively suggests that Rufinus was the secretary who held office from October 222 to October 223 (known in modern scholarship as "secretary no. 7"), early in the reign of Severus Alexander (r. 222–235). His removal from office would have followed the murder of the praetorian prefect Ulpian in the summer of 223.

Probably in the reign of Severus Alexander, Rufinus was adlected inter aedilicios to the Senate and served as praetor. He was legatus Augusti pro praetore (governor) of the province of Noricum, modern Austria, and commander of the legio II Italica. At some point after this, he achieved consular status. He may have achieved this by serving as one of the suffect consuls or through a special dispensation from the emperor. In 238 AD, he was one of the twenty men appointed by the Senate to lead the opposition to Maximinus' invasion of Italy. After this, Gordian III named him as an amicus Caesaris ("friend of the Emperor").

=== Honorific inscriptions ===
Rufinus is honoured by four inscriptions from his hometown of Thyateira. These show that he was a clarissimus of consular rank and amicus Caesaris ("friend of the Emperor"). Three of these inscriptions (TAM V.2 984–986) honour him as "founder and benefactor" of the city. The fourth inscription, erected by an association of gardeners, is much fuller. It praises him for carrying out embassies to the emperor in order to secure "all the rights" for Thyateira and for making generous monetary contributions to the city. It also gives a chronological account of the offices that he had held in the Imperial service, which provides the basis for historians' reconstructions of his career.

At some point, probably after he achieved consular rank, Rufinus served as a lawyer for the League of the Macedonians "in the matter of the contribution of the Thessalians." This was probably a dispute about the amount of taxation that the Thessalian League was required to pay to the League of the Macedonians, which had arisen after Thessaly was transferred from the province of Achaia to the province of Macedonia. It is likely that this case was argued before the emperor. For this, Rufinus was honoured by two inscriptions, one in Thessalonica and the other in Beroea. The Thessalonican inscription (IG X.2(1) 142) makes reference to his status as a jurist, calling him "most versed in the laws."

Licinius Rufinus had a son, Gnaeus Licinius Rufinus the younger, who was honoured with two inscriptions at Thyateira (TAM V.2 987–988).

== Writings ==
Rufinus wrote a work of jurisprudence in Latin called Regulae ("examplars") which was twelve or thirteen books long. Seventeen excerpts from this work are included in the Digest of Roman law compiled under Justinian. The Digest also preserves a response by Julius Paulus to a query from Rufinus. One of Rufinus' fragments indicates that he wrote during the reign of Caracalla or - less likely - Elagabalus. The fragments show a tendency to explicitly state basic legal principles.

== Edition ==
- Lenel, O. (1889). Palingenesia Juris Civilis: Juris Consultorum Reliquiae quae Justiniani Digestis continentur, ceteraque iuris prudentiae civilis fragmenta minora secundum auctores et libros, vol. I. pp. 559–562.

== Bibliography ==
- Robert, L. (1948). "Un juriste romain dans une inscription de Beroia". Hellenica 5. p. 29.
- Herrmann, Peter (1997). "Die Karriere eines prominenten Juristen aus Thyateira". Tyche – Beiträge zur Alten Geschichte, Papyrologie und Epigraphik. 12: 111–123. doi:10.15661/tyche.1997.012.09. ISSN 2409-5540.
- Millar, Fergus (1999). "The Greek East and Roman Law: The Dossier of M. Cn. Licinius Rufinus". The Journal of Roman Studies. 89: 90–108. doi:10.2307/300736. ISSN 0075-4358.
