= Quintus Mucius Scaevola Pontifex =

Ancient Roman jurist, politician and writer (consul in 97 BC)

Quintus Mucius Scaevola
- Born: 140 BC
- Died: 82 BC (aged 57–58); Temple of Vesta at Rome
- Cause of death: Murdered
- Occupations: Politician, jurist, priest
- Office: Plebeian tribune (106 BC); Curule aedile (by 100 BC); Praetor (by 98 BC); Proconsul (Asia) (by 97 BC); Consul (95 BC); Pontifex maximus (c. 89–82 BC)
- Spouse: Licinia
- Children: Mucia Tertia

Quintus Mucius Scaevola "Pontifex" (140–82 BC) was a politician of the Roman Republic and an important early authority on Roman law. He is credited with founding the study of law as a systematic discipline. He was elected pontifex maximus, as had been his father and uncle before him. He was the first Roman pontifex maximus to be murdered publicly, in Rome in the temple of the Vestal Virgins, signifying a breakdown of historical norms and religious taboos in the Republic.

== Political career ==
Quintus Scaevola was the son of Publius Mucius Scaevola, a jurist who held the consulship of 133 BC and was also pontifex maximus. Quintus was likely inducted into the pontifical college early in his life, probably around the time that his father died, c. 115 BC. His first documented office was that of plebeian tribune in 106 BC, during which he presided over a debate on a lex Servilia. He served as aedile by 100 BC and praetor by 98 BC. He is further attested as proconsular governor of Asia, during which he earned a reputation as a severe and incorruptible governor. However, the severity of his governorship towards the rich equestrians in the province led to his legate Publius Rutilius Rufus being convicted on false charges of corruption and exiled at the initiative of the equestrians wronged.

He was then elected consul for 95 BC. His colleague was Lucius Licinius Crassus. They passed a law, the lex Licinia Mucia, which related to non-Roman Italians' citizenship claims. It may have required Italians and Latins resident at Rome to return to their home towns and established a quaestio to enforce it. According to Roman commentator Quintus Asconius Pedianus, the law was one of the causes for the Social War that followed mere years later, playing a role in alienating the Italians affected by the law. In another view, put forward by Ernst Badian, it may have merely provided mechanisms to check false claims of Roman citizenship, which could emerge due to fraudulent assertions of the Latin rights' ius migrationis. If it had an impact on the Italians, it likely emerged due their fraudulent enrolment as citizens during the censorship of 97/96 BC.

Later in Scaevola's term, he vetoed his colleague's proposal to celebrate a triumph for minor victories against raiders in Cisalpine Gaul. If his Asian proconsulship is dated to 94 BC rather than 98/97, it would have occurred here; reading of Cicero's Philippicae however suggests that Scaevola renounced his province.

Nothing is known of his activities until the death of Gnaeus Domitius Ahenobarbus, then pontifex maximus, c. 89 BC. Scaevola, probably the oldest member of the college, was elected to the now vacant priesthood.

== Legal career ==
Scaevola was a renowned jurist in later days. He wrote a book on the ius civile which spanned some thirty nine books. The Digest of Justinian contained some 100 fragments of it, though none of the fragments survive to the present. One of the main points of Scaevola's discussion was inheritance law, specifically the drafting of wills and the rights or responsibilities of legatees. He also discussed the law of theft and damages. Four excerpts of his works may have been incorporated by Justinian I into his Pandectae; however, it is likely that by the time the Pandects or their preceding compendia were written, little remained of his actual writing except secondhand summaries which were incorporated under his name.

His forensic speeches were praised by Cicero, who in youth was one of his pupils from 87 BC.

He was also the originator of cautelary law giving his name to the cautio Muciana and the praesumptio Muciana. The cautio Muciana was an equitable remedy which permitted a legatee to receive a conditional legacy if security was given for the performance of the condition. The praesumptio Muciana on the other hand related to family law, creating a rebuttable presumption that a wife's possessions came from her husband.

The 2nd-century jurist Sextus Pomponius lists the four most eminent pupils of Mucius as Gaius Juventius, Gaius Aquilius Gallus, Lucius Lucilius Balbus, and Gaius Papirius.

== Death ==
Scaevola was killed in the civil unrest surrounding the power struggle between Sulla and Gaius Marius. At the latter's funeral in 86 BC, an attempt was made on his life at the instigation of Flavius Fimbria, one of Marius's most violent partisans, who, upon hearing that the victim survived, albeit with a severe wound, launched a prosecution against him, on the grounds that the priest had not allowed the blade to be fully thrust onto his body.

During Sulla's civil war, when Gaius Marius' homonymous son was consul in the year 82 BC and besieged by the Sullans at Praeneste, the younger Marius sent orders to the praetor Lucius Junius Brutus Damasippus to have Scaevola and other opposing leaders killed. Damasippus convened the Senate on some pretext in order to lure in Scaevola and other men deemed unreliable. Once Scaevola realized the ploy, he fled to the temple of Vesta where, at the vestibule, he was killed by assassins. His corpse was thrown unburied into the Tiber.

== Family ==
Scaevola was the son of Publius Mucius Scaevola, who was consul in 133 BC and also pontifex maximus. He married Licinia, the daughter of the orator Lucius Licinius Crassus, probably around 120 BC.

Only one of his children is known, a Mucia Tertia, who was later the wife of Pompey the Great, for whom she bore three children. After their separation, she remarried to the praetor in 56 BC, Marcus Aemilius Scaurus.

== See also ==
- Mucia gens
- College of Pontiffs

== Bibliography ==
- Broughton, Thomas Robert Shannon (1951). The magistrates of the Roman republic. Vol. 1. New York: American Philological Association.
- Broughton, Thomas Robert Shannon (1952). The magistrates of the Roman republic. Vol. 2. New York: American Philological Association.
- Broughton, Thomas Robert Shannon (1986). The magistrates of the Roman republic. Vol. 3. Atlanta, GA: Scholars Press.
- Dart, Christopher J. (2016) [First published by Ashgate, 2014]. The Social War, 91 to 88 BCE: a history of the Italian insurgency against the Roman republic. Routledge. ISBN 978-1-4724-1676-6.
- Kübler, Bernhard (1933). "Mucius 22" . Realencyclopädie der classischen Altertumswissenschaft (in German). Vol. XVI, 1. Stuttgart: Butcher. cols. 437–46 – via Wikisource.
- Mouritsen, Henrik (1998). Italian unification. BICS Supplement 70. London: Institute of Classical Studies. ISBN 0-9005-8781-4.
- Zmeskal, Klaus (2009). Adfinitas (in German). Vol. 1. Passau: Verlag Karl Stutz. ISBN 978-3-88849-304-1.

Political offices
Preceded by Gn. Domitius Ahenobarbus; G. Cassius Longinus	Consul of Rome; 95 BC; With: L. Licinius Crassus	Succeeded by G. Coelius Caldus; L. Domitius Ahenobarbus
