= De Divinatione =

Work by Cicero

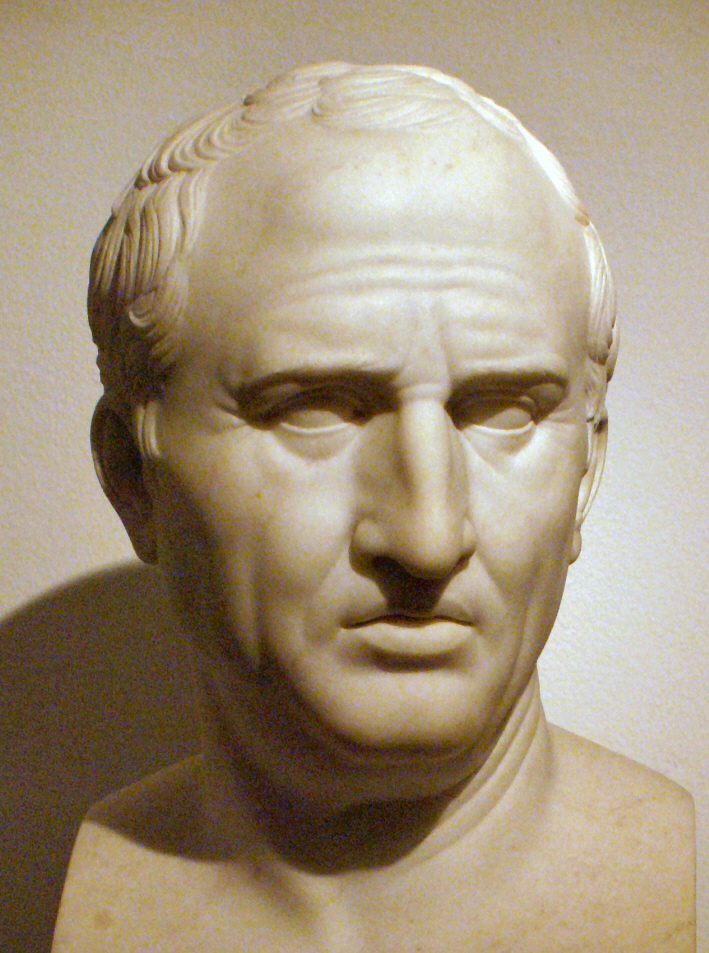
First-century AD bust of Cicero in the Capitoline Museums, Rome.

De Divinatione (Latin, "Concerning Divination") is a philosophical dialogue about ancient Roman divination written in 44 BC by Marcus Tullius Cicero.

== Contents ==
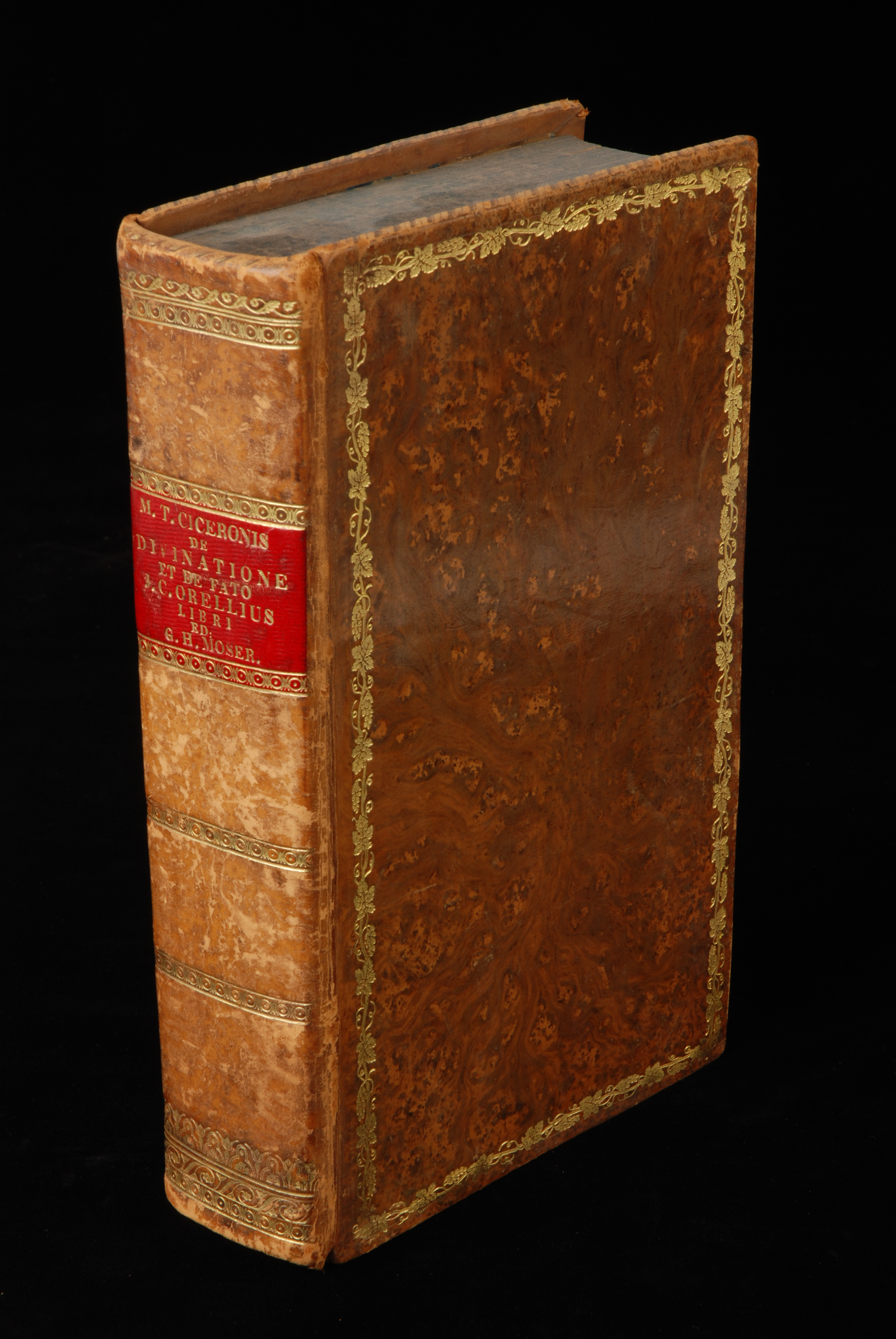
Bound edition of De divinatione and De fato, 1828

De Divinatione is set in two books, taking the form of a dialogue whose interlocutors are Cicero himself (speaking mostly in Book II, and including a fragment of Cicero's poem on his own consulship) and his brother Quintus. Book I deals with Quintus' apologetics in favor of divination (in line with his essentially Stoic beliefs), while Book II contains Cicero's refutation of these from his Academic skeptic philosophical standpoint. Cicero concerns himself in some detail with the types of divination, dividing them into the "inspired" type (Latin furor, Gk. mania, "madness"), especially dreams, and the type which occurs via some form of skill of interpretation (i.e., haruspicy, extispicy, augury, astrology, and other oracles).

De Divinatione may be considered as a supplement to Cicero's De Natura Deorum. In De Divinatione, Cicero professes to relate the substance of a conversation held at Tusculum with his brother, in which Quintus, following the principles of the Stoics, supported the credibility of divination, while Cicero himself controverted it. The dialogue consists of two books, in the first Quintus enumerates the different kinds or classes of divination, with reasons in their favour. The second book contains a refutation by Cicero of his brother's arguments.

In the first book Quintus, after observing that divinations of various kinds have been common among all people, remarks that it is no argument against different forms of divination that we cannot explain how or why certain things happen. It is sufficient, that we know from experience and history that they do happen. He argues that although events may not always succeed as predicted, it does not follow that divination is not an art, any more than that medicine is not an art, because it does not always cure. However, he proposes the idea that there are two types of augury. The first one which is fuelled by deduction and skill, is an art. The other, foreseeing the future while dreaming or in a frenzy, is ‘devoid of art’. Quintus offers various accounts of the different kinds of omens, dreams, portents, and divinations. He includes two remarkable dreams, one of which had occurred to Cicero and one to himself. He also asks if Greek history with its various accounts of omens should be also considered a fable.

In the second book Cicero provides arguments against auguries, auspices, astrology, lots, dreams, and every species of omens and prodigies. For example, he argues that he dreamt of Marius during his banishment because he often thought about him, not because it was some sort of omen. He states that during one's sleep, the soul is in a relaxed state and remnants of one's waking thoughts move freely within the soul. Using an example where an unnamed interpreter and Antipho interpret an Olympic runner’s dream as both a victory and defeat, he suggests that that divination is based on the interpretation of the augur, and has no logical grounds or skill.

Cicero also disagrees with Cratippus’s certainty of the existence of divination. He states that prophecies come true due to luck or chance, while mythical tellings of Oracles are myths, and should not be taken for fact. He further criticizes the ‘riddles’ that divination and ‘dream messages’ provide. He questions whether the gods genuinely intend to warn mortals of the future if such omens are obscure and prone to misunderstanding.

Book Two concludes with a chapter on the evils of superstition, and Cicero's efforts to extirpate it. The whole thread is interwoven by curious and interesting stories.

De Divinatione is notable as one of posterity's primary sources on the workings of Roman religion, and as a source for the conception of scientificity in Roman classical antiquity.

== Divination in a Military Context ==
Quintus and Cicero attempt to convince each other of the validity of divination as a means to predict the outcome of war. Using mythical, historical and factual examples of military decisions, they argue whether augury foresees the fate of battles, or whether it is illogical for leaders to trust in omens.

In Book One, Quintus brings up the examples of Publius Claudius, a commander of a Roman naval fleet who lost most of his navy in the First Punic War, and Agamemnon, who lost many fleets at sea after ignoring adverse auguries. He also brings up the example of Gaius Flaminius in the Second Punic War, who died and had his army decimated in battle due to his disregard for omens. Gaius ignored the warning of augurs to postpone the battle with Hannibal three times. He argues that matters of ‘grave concern’, such as revolutions and wars, have been predicted accurately by augurs who saw natural disasters and unusual weather phenomenon as omens. The Marsian war is mentioned to have been preceded by strange occurrences, such as sweating statues of the gods and unknown voices predicting wars. Lastly, he uses the history of the ‘capture of Rome by the Gauls’ to prove that prophecies would eventually become true. “ Cicero, Divination,1.44.”

In Book Two, Cicero lists examples of augury used as the basis of faulty military decisions. During Hannibal's exile at King Prusias's court in Anatolia, Hannibal's advice to go to war was met with the king's response of "I do not dare because the entrails forbid." Similarly, during the civil war between Caesar and Pompey in the 1st century BC, augurs sent assurances to Pompey while he was in Greece, claiming that he would win the civil war. Cicero also questioned the validity of the significance of cock crowing as a sign of victory. In Lebadia, Boeotian bards predicted victory for the Thebans based on the crowing of cocks, believing that cocks are silent when defeated and crow when victorious. However, some philosophers argued that cocks can crow spontaneously, influenced by nature or chance, making them unreliable predictors of battle outcomes.

== Quotes ==
- Nothing so absurd can be said that some philosopher had not said it. (Latin: Sed nescio quo modo nihil tam absurde dici potest quod non dicatur ab aliquo philosophorum) (II, 119)
- That old saying by Cato is quite well known; he said he was surprised that one haruspex did not burst out laughing when he saw another one. (Latin: Vetus autem illud Catonis admodum scitum est, qui mirari se aiebat quod non rideret haruspex haruspicem cum vidisset) (II, 24, 51)
