= Quintus Lucilius Balbus =

1st-century BC Roman philosopher

Quintus Lucilius Balbus (fl. 100 BC) was a Stoic philosopher and a pupil of Panaetius.

Balbus appeared to Cicero as comparable to the best Greek philosophers. He is introduced by Cicero in his dialogue On the Nature of the Gods as the expositor of the opinions of the Stoics on that subject, and his arguments are represented as of considerable weight. His name appears in the extant fragments of Cicero's Hortensius, but it is no longer thought that Balbus was a speaker in the dialogue.
