= Joyce E. Salisbury =

American historian (born 1944)

- Occupation: Academic
- Awards: Adèle Mellen Prize (1985); American Library Association Award for Outstanding Reference Text (2005)

Academic work
- Discipline: Humanistic Studies
- Institutions: University of Wisconsin–Green Bay

Joyce E. Salisbury is an American historian. She is professor emerita of humanistic studies (history) at the University of Wisconsin–Green Bay, where she was named Frankenthal Family distinguished professor in 1993, and was the Director of International Education.

Salisbury is the author of hundreds of publications and more than ten books that address early modern and medieval social and gender history, as well as early Christianity. Salisbury's edited volume, The Greenwood Encyclopedia of Daily Life: A Tour Through History from Ancient Times to the Present, won the American Library Association award for outstanding reference text in 2005.

She has also created a range of public humanities projects, including several for Great Courses, including The Middle Ages Around the World.

== Reviews of her books ==
- Angers, Denise (1992). "Joyce E. Salisbury, éd. – Sex in the Middle Ages. A Book of Essays. London: Garland, 1991, xv, 258 p. (Garland Reference Library of the Humanities, vol. 1360; Garland Medieval Casebooks, vol. 3)". Histoire Sociale / Social History (in French). 25 (50): 435–437. ISSN 1918-6576.
- Atkinson, Clarissa W. (April 1993). "Church Fathers, Independent Virgins by Joyce E. Salisbury". Journal of the History of Sexuality. 3 (4). University of Texas Press: 635–637. ISSN 1535-3605. JSTOR 3704398.
- Burton, T. L. (July 1996). "The Beast Within: Animals in the Middle Ages (review)". Parergon. 14 (1): 303–305. doi:10.1353/pgn.1996.0037. S2CID 143341310.
- Heintz, Michael (1999). "Perpetua's Passion: The Death and Memory of a Young Roman Woman". Journal of Early Christian Studies. 7 (2): 304–305. doi:10.1353/earl.1999.0042. S2CID 170194463.
- McClanan, Anne (2017). "Rome's Christian Empress: Galla Placidia at the Twilight of the Empire." Speculum 92 (3): 891-892. doi.org/10.1086/692256.
- Morrison, Tessa (2011). "The Beast Within: Animals in the Middle Ages 2nd edn [Book Review]". Journal of the Australian Early Medieval Association. 7: 160–162. ISSN 1449-9320.
- Murray, Jacqueline (January 1993). "Sex in the Middle Ages: A Book of Essays by Joyce E. Salisbury". Journal of the History of Sexuality. 3 (3). University of Texas Press: 494–496. ISSN 1535-3605. JSTOR 3704019.
- Oden, Amy G. (September 1998). "Perpetua's Passion: The Death and Memory of a Young Roman Woman by Joyce E. Salisbury". Church History. 67 (3). Cambridge University Press: 560–562. doi:10.2307/3170950. ISSN 1755-2613. JSTOR 3170950. S2CID 163074368.
