= De Natura Deorum =

Philosophical dialogue by Cicero

De Natura Deorum (On the Nature of the Gods)
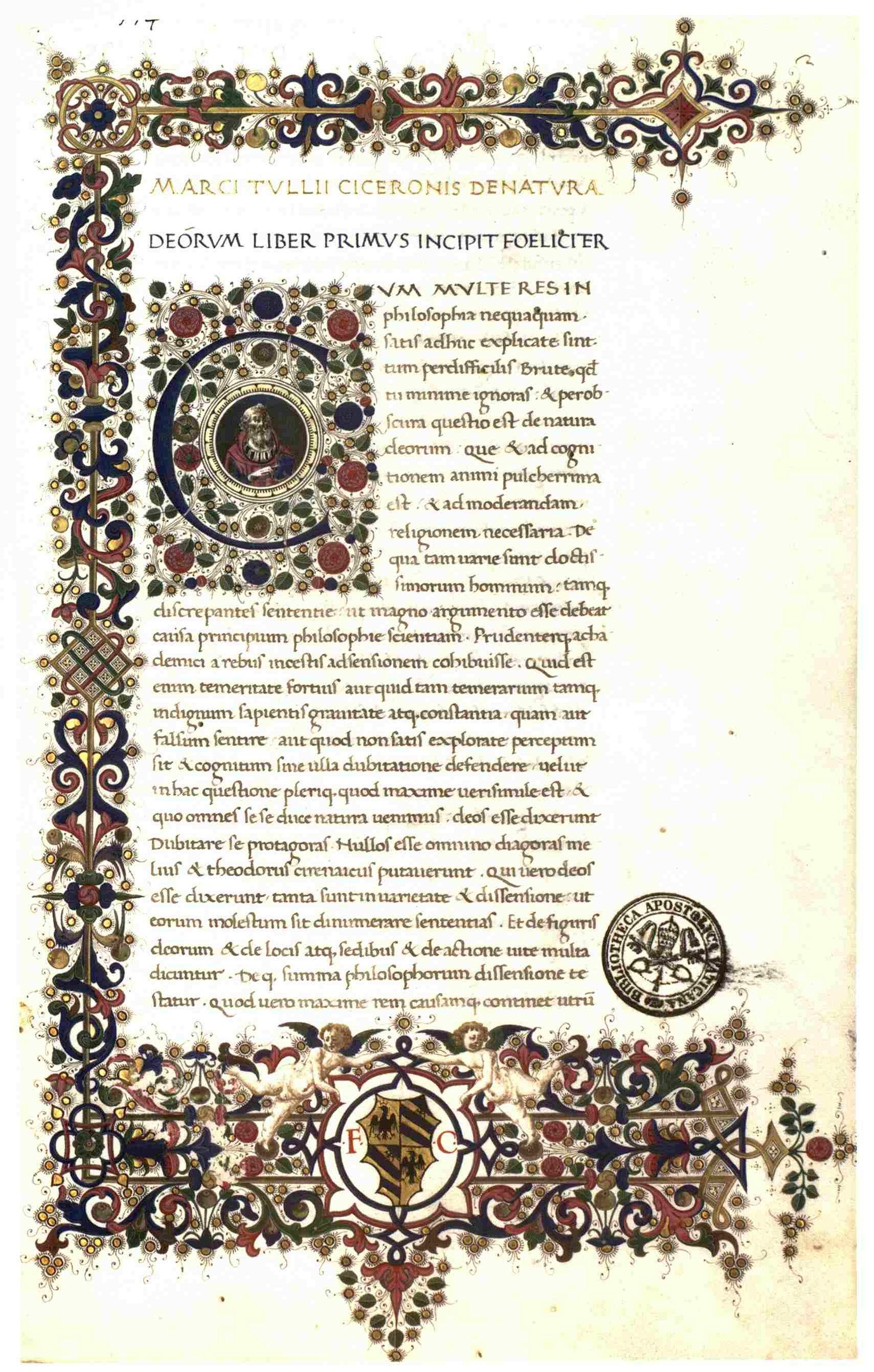
- 15th-century manuscript, Vatican
- Author: Cicero
- Language: Classical Latin
- Subject: Roman religion, Ancient Greek religion, problem of evil
- Genre: Theology, philosophy
- Publication date: 45 BC
- Publication place: Roman Republic
- Dewey Decimal: 292.07
- Preceded by: Tusculanae Disputationes
- Followed by: De Divinatione
- Original text: De Natura Deorum (On the Nature of the Gods) at Latin Wikisource

De Natura Deorum (On the Nature of the Gods) is a philosophical dialogue by Roman Academic Skeptic philosopher Cicero written in 45 BC. It is laid out in three books that discuss the theological views of the Hellenistic philosophies of Epicureanism, Stoicism, and Academic Skepticism.

== Writing ==
De Natura Deorum belongs to the group of philosophical works which Cicero wrote in the two years preceding his death in 43 BC. He states near the beginning of De Natura Deorum that he wrote them both as a relief from the political inactivity to which he was reduced by the supremacy of Julius Caesar, and as a distraction from the grief caused by the death of his daughter Tullia.

The dialogue is supposed to take place in Rome at the house of Gaius Aurelius Cotta. In the dialogue he appears as pontiff, but not as consul. He was made pontiff soon after 82 BC, and consul in 75 BC, and as Cicero, who is present at the dialogue as a listener, did not return from Athens till 77 BC, its fictional date can be set between the years 77 and 75 BC, when Cicero was about thirty years of age, and Cotta about forty-eight.

The book contains various obscurities and inconsistencies which demonstrate that it was probably never revised by Cicero, nor published until after his death. For the content, Cicero borrowed largely from earlier Greek sources. However, the hasty arrangement by Cicero of authorities who themselves wrote independently of one another means that the work lacks cohesion, and points raised by one speaker are sometimes not countered by subsequent speakers.

== Contents ==
The dialogue is on the whole narrated by Cicero himself, though he does not play an active part in the discussion. Gaius Velleius represents the Epicurean school, Quintus Lucilius Balbus argues for the Stoics, and Gaius Cotta speaks for Cicero's own Academic Skepticism. The first book of the dialogue contains Cicero's introduction, Velleius' case for the Epicurean theology and Cotta's criticism of Epicureanism. Book II focuses on Balbus' explanation and defense of Stoic theology. Book III lays out Cotta's criticism of Balbus' claims. Cicero's conclusions are ambivalent and muted, "a strategy of civilized openness"; he does, however, conclude that Balbus' claims, in his mind, more nearly approximate the truth (3.95).

=== Book 1 ===
In Book 1 Cicero visits the house of Cotta the Pontifex Maximus, where he finds Cotta with Velleius, who is a Senator and Epicurean, and Balbus, who is a supporter of the Stoics. Cotta himself is an Academic Skeptic, and he informs Cicero that they were discoursing on the nature of the gods. Velleius had been stating the sentiments of Epicurus upon the subject. Velleius is requested to go on with his arguments after recapitulating what he had already said. The discourse of Velleius consists of three parts: a general attack on Platonist and Stoic cosmology; a historical review of the earlier philosophers; and an exposition of Epicurean theology. Velleius raises the difficulty of supposing the creation of the universe to have taken place at a particular period of time, and questions the possible motive of a God in undertaking the work. The historical section (10–15), is full of inaccuracies and misstatements, of which it is likely that Cicero himself was ignorant, since he has Cotta later praise this account. The purpose however is for Velleius to show that the Epicurean idea of God as a perfectly happy, eternal being, possessed of reason, and in human form, is the only tenable one, and the other differing opinions is regarded as proof of their worthlessness. In the remainder of the book, Cotta attacks the positions of Velleius with regard to the form of the gods, and their exemption from creation and providence.

=== Book 2 ===
In Book 2, Balbus gives the Stoics' position on the subject of the gods. He alludes to the magnificence of the world, and the prevalence of belief, and refers to the frequent appearance of the gods themselves in history. After referring to the practice of divination, Balbus proceeds to the "four causes" of Cleanthes as to how the idea of the gods is implanted in the minds of people: (1) a pre-knowledge of future events; (2) the great advantages we enjoy from nature; (3) the terror with which the mind is affected by thunder, tempests, and the like; (4) and the order and regularity in the universe. Balbus further contends that the world, or universe itself, and its parts, are possessed of reason and wisdom. He finally discusses the creation of the world, the providence of the gods, and denies "that a world, so beautifully adorned, could be formed by chance, or by a fortuitous concourse of atoms." The problem of how to account for the presence of misery and disaster in a world providentially governed (the so-called "problem of evil") is only hurriedly touched upon at the end of the book.

=== Book 3 ===
In book 3 Cotta refutes the doctrines of Balbus. A large portion of this book, probably more than one third, has been lost. Cotta represents the appearances of gods as idle tales. There follows a gap in the text, following which Cotta attacks the four causes of Cleanthes. Cotta refutes the Stoic ideas on reason attributed to the universe and its parts. Ten chapters (16–25) are devoted to a disproportionately lengthy discussion of mythology, with examples multiplied to an inordinate extent. There follows another major gap in the text, at the end of which Cotta is seen attacking the doctrine of providential care for humans. Cicero states "The conversation ended here, and we parted. Velleius judged that the arguments of Cotta were the truest, but those of Balbus seemed to me to have the greater probability."

== Influence ==
The Christian writers Tertullian, Minucius Felix, Lactantius, and Augustine were acquainted with De Natura Deorum.

This work, alongside De Officiis and De Divinatione, was highly influential on the philosophes of the 18th century. David Hume was familiar with the work and used it to style his own Dialogues Concerning Natural Religion. Voltaire described De Natura Deorum and the Tusculan Disputations as "the two most beautiful books ever produced by the wisdom of humanity".

In 1811 a fourth book was 'discovered' and published by one 'P. Seraphinus' in Bologna. In this forgery Cicero asserts many points compatible with Christian and Catholic dogma, and even argues in favour of an authority equivalent to the Papacy. The real author might have been the protestant pastor and superintendent Hermann Heimart Cludius (1754-1835).

== Scholarship ==
This text is an important source of Epicurean, Stoic, and Academic Skeptic views on religion and theology because it supplements the scant primary texts that remain on these topics.

In particular, heated scholarly debate has focused on this text's discussion at 1.43–44 of how the Epicurean gods may be said to "exist"; David Sedley, for example, holds that Epicureans, as represented in this text and elsewhere, think that "gods are our own graphic idealization of the life to which we aspire", whereas David Konstan maintains that "the Epicurean gods are real, in the sense that they exist as atomic compounds and possess the properties that pertain to the concept, or prolēpsis, that people have of them."

== Quotations ==
- There is in fact no subject upon which so much difference of opinion exists, not only among the unlearned but also among educated men; and the views entertained are so various and so discrepant, that, while it is no doubt a possible alternative that none of them is true, it is certainly impossible that more than one should be so. (Res enim nulla est, de qua tantopere non solum indocti, sed etiam docti dissentiant; quorum opiniones cum tam variae sint tamque inter se dissidentes, alterum fieri profecto potest, ut earum nulla, alterum certe non potest, ut plus una vera sit) (I, 2)
- We, on the contrary, make blessedness of life depend upon an untroubled mind, and exemption from all duties. (We think a happy life consists in tranquility of mind). (Nos autem beatam vitam in animi securitate et in omnium vacatione munerum ponimus) (I, 53)
- For time destroys the fictions of error and opinion, while it confirms the determinations of nature and of truth. (Opinionis enim commenta delet dies, naturae iudicia confirmat) (II, 2)
- [It does not follow that], because not all the sick recover, medicine is a worthless science (Ne aegri quidem quia non omnes convalescunt, idcirco ars nulla medicina est) (II, 12)
- Things perfected by nature are better than those finished by art. (Meliora sunt ea quae natura quam illa quae arte perfecta sunt) (II, 87)
- Just as it is better to use no wine whatever in the treatment of the sick, because it is rarely beneficial and very often injurious, than to rush upon evident calamity in the hope of an uncertain recovery, so, I incline to think, it would have been better for the human race that that swift movement of thought, that keenness and shrewdness which we call reason, since it is destructive to many and profitable to very few, should not have been given at all, than that it should have been given so freely and abundantly. (Ut vinum aegrotis, quia prodest raro, nocet saepissime, melius est non adhibere omnino quam spe dubiae salutis in apertam perniciem incurrere, sic haud scio, an melius fuerit humano generi motum istum celerem cogitationis, acumen, sollertiam, quam rationem vocamus, quoniam pestifera sit multis, admodum paucis salutaris, non dari omnino quam tam munifice et tam large dari.) (III, 69)
- There never was a great man unless through divine inspiration. (Nemo igitur vir magnus sine aliquo adflatu divino umquam fuit) (II, 167)

== Text ==
=== Latin text ===
- M. TVLLI CICERONIS DE NATVRA DEORVM AD M. BRVTVM LIBER PRIMVS
- M. TVLLI CICERONIS DE NATVRA DEORVM AD M. BRVTVM LIBER SECVNDVS
- M. TVLLI CICERONIS DE NATVRA DEORVM AD M. BRVTVM LIBER TERTIVS
- De natura deorum, libri tres (vol. 1) (Cambridge, Univ. Press 1880–1885)
- De natura deorum, libri tres (vol. 2) (Cambridge, Univ. Press 1880–1885)
- De natura deorum, libri tres (vol. 3) (Cambridge, Univ. Press 1880–1885)

=== Translations ===
- De Natura Deorum, trans. Francis Brooks (London: Methuen, 1896)
- De Natura Deorum; Academica, with an English translation by H. Rackham (1933) Loeb Classical Library. ISBN 0434992682
- Project Gutenberg: On the Nature of the Gods is contained in C. D. Yonge's literal translation of three philosophical works by Cicero, with notes and some quotes in Latin
- On the Nature of the Gods – Public domain audiobook translated by Charles Duke Yonge (1894)
  - On the Nature of the Gods public domain audiobook at LibriVox
