= Sextus Pomponius =

2nd century Roman jurist

Sextus Pomponius (fl. 2nd century) was a Roman jurist who lived during the reigns of Hadrian, Antoninus Pius, and Marcus Aurelius.

== Name ==
Sextus was a fairly common Roman given name (praenomen) while his surname seems to indicate he belonged to the Pomponia family (gens). Other writers have expressed a view that the name Sextus Pomponius was shared by another jurist, although Puchta suggested the assumption of two Pomponii was unsupported by the evidence.

== Works ==
S. Pomponius wrote a book on the law up to the time of Hadrian, known as the Enchiridion (Ancient Greek: Ἐγχειρίδιον, Enkheidírion, "Handbook"). A long excerpt of the work forms part of Justinian's Digest dealing with the origin of the Roman Constitution and various offices.
