= History of Rome (disambiguation) =

The History of Rome or Roman History usually refers to one of:

- The history of the city of Rome in present-day Italy
- The history of the various states established by the city of Rome in antiquity, covered separately in:
  - History of the Roman Kingdom
  - History of the Roman Republic
  - History of the Roman Empire, sometimes inclusive of the History of the Byzantine Empire
- The history of other places named Rome, including:
  - History of Rome, Georgia

The History of Rome or Roman History may also refer to:

- Works entitled or referenced as "The History of Rome" or "Roman History":
  - Roman History (Fabius Pictor), a lost work completed in the late 3rd century BC
  - History of Rome (Alimentus), another name for his Annals, a lost work completed around 200 BC
  - History of Rome (Cato), another name for his Origins, a lost work completed in the mid-2nd century BC
  - History of Rome (Hemina), another name for his Annals, a lost work completed in the mid-2nd century BC
  - History of Rome (Gellius), a lost work completed in the mid-2nd century BC
  - History of Rome (Quadrigarius), a lost work completed in the 1st century BC
  - History of Rome (Macer), a lost work completed in the 1st century BC
  - Roman History (Antias), another name for his annals, a lost work completed in the 1st century BC
  - History of Rome (Livy), another name for his Ab Urbe Condita Libri, completed in 9 BC
  - Roman History (Velleius), another name for his Compendium of Roman History, completed in the early 1st century
  - Roman History (Appian), a lost work completed in the mid-2nd century
  - Roman History (Cassius Dio), completed in the 230s
  - Roman History (Eutropius), another name for his Brevarium Historiae Romanae, completed in the 360s
  - Roman History (Ammianus Marcellinus), another name for his Rerum Gestarum Libri, completed in the 380s
  - The History of Rome (Wotton), from the reign of Commodus to the end of the Severan dynasty, completed in 1701
  - The Roman History (Rollin), abandoned in 1741 and variously completed by others
  - Roman History (Bower), completed in 1748, Vols. XII, XIII, XIV, & XV of An Universal History
  - Roman History (Hooke), completed in 1771
  - Roman History (Goldsmith), another name for Mr Goldsmith's Roman History Abridged by Himself for the Use of Schools, completed in 1772
  - Elements of the Roman History (Cobbett), completed in 1828
  - History of Rome (Malden), completed in 1830 for the Society for the Diffusion of Useful Knowledge
  - History of Rome (Niebuhr), completed in 1832
  - A History of Rome, completed in 1833, Vols. XLIX & LXXIII of Lardner's Cabinet Cyclopædia
  - The History of Rome (Keightley), completed in 1836
  - History of Rome (Arnold), abandoned in 1842
  - The History of Rome (Schmitz), completed in 1851
  - A History of Rome (Liddell), completed in 1855
  - History of Rome (Mommsen), completed in 1856
  - History of Rome (Merivale) may refer to either of:
    - History of the Romans under the Empire, completed in 1862
    - A General History of Rome, completed in 1875
  - History of Rome (Yonge), another name for her Young Folks' History of Rome, completed in 1878
  - History of Rome (Creighton), completed in 1880
  - History of Rome and the Roman People (Duruy), completed in 1885
  - Roman History (Ihne), completed in 1890 and also translated under the name The History of Rome
  - A History of Rome (Greenidge), abandoned in 1904
  - A Short History of Rome (Abbott), completed in 1906
  - A Short History of Rome (Ferrero & Barbagallo), an abridgment of Ferrero's Grandezza e Decadenza di Roma completed in 1919
  - A History of Rome (Cary), completed in 1935
  - A History of Rome (Robinson), completed in 1941
  - The History of Rome (Grant), completed in 1979
  - The History of Rome (podcast), also known as THoR

== See also ==
- Timeline of the city of Rome
- Timeline of Roman history
- The Matter of Rome
- Roman historiography
- Historiography of the fall of the Western Roman Empire
- Annals
- Annalists
- History of the Papacy, also known as the "Diocese of Rome"
- History of the Roman Canon of Christian worship
- History of the Romani people, also known as the "Roma"
