= Gnaeus Gellius =

2nd-century BC Roman historian

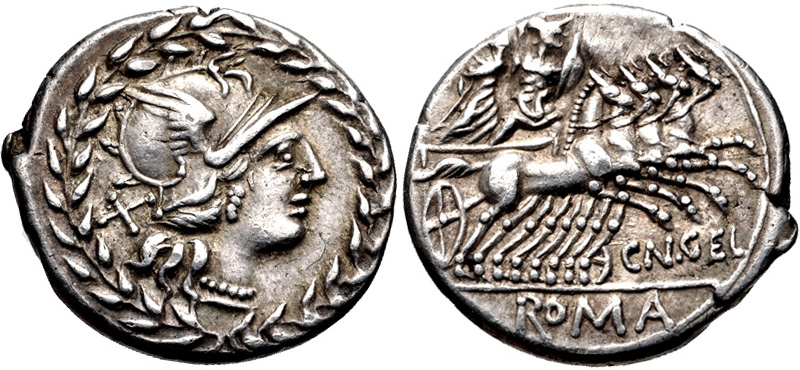
Denarius of Gnaeus Gellius, minted in 138 BC. Roma is pictured on the obverse within a laurel-wreath, while Mars drives a quadriga on the reverse. The moneyer's name CN. GEL is written below the chariot.

Gnaeus Gellius (fl. 2nd half of 2nd century BC) was a Roman historian. Very little is known about his life and work, which has only survived in scattered fragments. He continued the historical tradition set by Fabius Pictor of writing a year-by-year history of Rome from mythological times to his day. However, with about a hundred books, Gellius' Annales were massively more developed than the other Roman annalists, and was only surpassed by Livy's gigantic History of Rome.

== Life ==
Gnaeus Gellius belonged to the plebeian gens Gellia. The gens was probably of Samnite origin as two generals of the Second and Third Samnite wars bore this name (Statius Gellius and Gellius Egnatius). Some of its members later moved to Rome, perhaps not long before the historian was born, since only one Roman named Gellius is known before him—likely his father, likewise with the name Gnaeus. The historian's father was opposed in court to a man named Lucius Turius, who was defended by Cato the Censor. Several scholars have however considered that the historian was the same as Cato's opponent, but this view seems now abandoned.

Gellius' only known magistracy was that of triumvir monetalis in 138, during which he minted denarii and bronze fractions (semis, triens, and quadrans). This denarius features on the reverse a quadriga led by Mars with a character beside him, which was initially thought to be Nerio—a goddess of Sabine origin that was the partner of Mars—but this view has been rejected by Michael Crawford and later historians, who argue the second character is only a captive. The confusion arose from the fact that most of the knowledge on Nerio comes precisely from a rare fragment of Gellius' Annales.

Several modern historians have postulated that Gellius belonged to the Populares, the reformist faction during the last century of the Republic, because he was used by Licinius Macer, another Popularis historian, and his writing appears to favour the plebeians. He also detailed several legends on other Italian peoples, whom the Populares wanted to grant the Roman citizenship at the time of Gellius. Moreover, several Gellii are known for the 1st century BC; they took the cognomen Poplicola ("of the people"), which could reveal a link with the Populares. Evidences have nevertheless been judged too thin by later scholars; John Briscoe does not even discuss this theory.

== Work ==
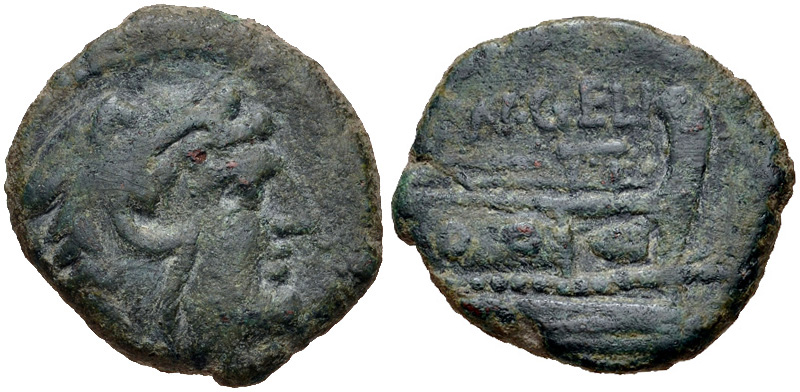
Bronze quadrans of Gnaeus Gellius, 138 BC. The name is here spelled CN. GELI.

=== Date ===
Gellius followed the standard established by Fabius Pictor—the first Roman historian—of writing a chronological history of Rome from mythological times to the present. Although Pictor wrote his book in Greek, Roman historians switched to Latin after Cato published his Origines in that language at the end of his life (in the 150s).

The date of composition is uncertain. Modern historians have ordered the Roman annalists after two enumerations by Cicero, who put Gellius' Annales after those of Lucius Calpurnius Piso Frugi, Gaius Sempronius Tuditanus and Gaius Fannius C. f., but before Lucius Coelius Antipater's shorter history of the Second Punic War. The latter possibly wrote his book circa 110. He or Piso were probably the first to give their work the title of Annales.

=== Size ===
The most striking feature of Gellius' work is its huge size. Charisius indeed quotes a word from "book 97", which may not even be the last one of the Annales. This number was unprecedented in Roman historiography; for instance, Lucius Cassius Hemina wrote only five books, Piso about 8, and Tuditanus at least 13. Modern historians have consequently doubted that Gellius reached that number. Münzer thought that it was an invention of a later grammarian to boast about the extent of his reading. Others suggested that "97" is a corruption in the manuscript; Martine Chassignet corrected it as "book 27", Maixner, Beck and Walter as "book 47". Elizabeth Rawson notes that these numbers were still much higher than Gellius' predecessors. However, John Briscoe sees no reason to dismiss the initial number of books. He shows that while Livy tells all the events prior to the foundation of the Roman Republic in his first book, Gellius was still dealing with the Rape of the Sabines in his third book, whereas this event took place at the beginning of the reign of Romulus. We also know that the events of 216 are described by Livy in his 23rd book, while Gellius had already reached book 33 by that time. The number of 97 books is therefore consistent with Gellius' chronology; moreover, as with the other Roman historians, he probably spent more time telling about the events he witnessed.

It was first thought, especially by Ernst Badian, that Gellius could only have produced such quantity of books by including into his work the information contained in the Annales Maximi. These were a compilation of omens and religious events recorded from the earliest times by the pontifex maximus; they counted 80 volumes and were said to have been published by Publius Mucius Scaecola, pontifex maximus between 130 and 115—the years of Gellius' activity. This theory crumbled after a study published by Bruce Frier in 1979, who argued that the true date of the Annales Maximi's publication was under Augustus. Frier triggered a long debate among scholars, but they have agreed with him that their significance was not as crucial as Badian used to think, and the view that they were used by Gellius to fill his hundred books has been abandoned.

But anyone who reads book 3 of the Annales of Gnaeus Gellius will realize that that [sc. Plaut. Truc. 515] was said with knowledge rather than comic intent; it is written there that Hersilia, when she was speaking before Titus Tatius and begging for peace, prayed in the following way: I beseech you, Neria wife of Mars, give us peace, I beseech you that we may enjoy long-lasting and successful marriages, because it was the plan of your husband that brought it about that they should seize us in the same way, when we were virgins, from whom they could acquire children for themselves and their relations, and future generations for their fatherland.

— The largest verbatim quote (in italic) of Gnaeus Gellius' Annales, preserved by Aulus Gellius in the Attic Nights.

Briscoe suggests instead that Gellius filled his books with invented speeches; significantly, the only long verbatim quote of Gellius' work is a speech of the Sabine Hersilia (and Romulus' wife) in the aftermath of the Rape of the Sabines. In addition, Gellius seems to have combined several legends to invent his own. For example, he said that King Numa had only one daughter, Pompilia, while the canonical view was that he had four sons. He also tells that Cacus seized a kingdom in Campania, whereas the standard story presents him as a brigand. He furthermore mentions a flood of the Fucine Lake that destroyed the otherwise unknown town of Archippe, but this Greek name is improbable for a town in central Italy and should be regarded as Gellius' invention, who was possibly inspired by a real flood which occurred in 137. As a result of these literary artifices, Gellius must be the Roman historian that vastly inflated the Roman historical narrative, since his predecessors' histories of Rome were much shorter, and his successors wrote longer works (though not as long as Gellius'). This process called "the expansion of the past" by Badian was concluded by Livy in his monumental History of Rome, which is also full of fictitious speeches and repetitive military campaigns.

=== Later use ===
Gellius was later used as a source by Gaius Licinius Macer, a Popularis historian writing in the 70s BC. As with Gellius, Macer's work is lost, but he is cited three times alongside Gellius by Dionysios, a strong indication that Macer reproduced Gellius' work in his own Annales. Dionysios is the only surviving historian with citations of Gellius (six), but he does not quote him verbatim. Dionysios cites Gellius four times to show that he disagreed with other writers (fragments 1, 21–23), and two times to criticise him for his carelessness (fragments 24 and 25). As Gellius especially developed the founding myths of the world, he was used five times by Pliny the Elder in his Natural History, principally about the inventions of writing, mining, weights and measures, etc. (fragments 12–16).

Nevertheless, the majority of the fragments of Gellius' work come from Latin grammarians of the Late Empire, such as Macrobius (fl. 5th century AD), Servius, or Charisius (both fl. 4th century AD), who, with 11 fragments, was the author who cited Gellius the most. Moreover, the only verbatim quote of Gellius comes from Aulus Gellius, a grammarian and antiquarian of the 2nd century BC.

He was apparently both an accurate chronologer and a diligent investigator of ancient usages, respectfully cited by many later authorities. Regarding historical events themselves, his work was cited by Dionysius of Halicarnassus but largely ignored by Livy and Plutarch.

=== List of fragments ===
Cornell n°	Peter n°	Chassignet n°	Gellius' book n°	author	ref.	subject
1	11	11	2	Dionysios	ii.31	Rape of the Sabine women
2	12	12	2	Charisius	67	Rape of the Sabine women
3	13	13	2	Charisius	67	Rape of the Sabine women
4	14	14	3	Charisius	67, 68	Rape of the Sabine women
5	15	15	3	Aulus Gellius	xiii.23 § 13	Rape of the Sabine women
6	22	22	6	Charisius	68	
7	23	23	7	Charisius	68	Trial of Vestal Virgins?
8	25	24	15	Macrobius	i.16 § 21–24	389 BC, aftermath of the Sack of Rome
9	26	27	33	Charisius Priscian	69 GL ii.318 (Note: Same fragment cited by two authors.)	216 BC, death of L. Postumius Albinus
10	29	30	97	Charisius	68	
11	29	31	97	Charisius	68	
12	2–3	2	1 (probably)	a. Pliny b. Marius Victorinus	vii.192 vi.23	Invention of writing and the alphabet
13	4	3	1 (probably)	Pliny	vii.194	Invention of clay building by Toxius
14	5	4	1 (probably)	Pliny	vii.197	Invention of mining and medicine
15	6	5	1 (probably)	Pliny	vii.198	Invention of weights and measures
16	8	7	1 (probably)	Pliny	iii.108	Destruction of Archippe, a Marsic town
17	7	6	1 (probably)	Solinus	i.7–9	Story of Cacus
18	9	8	1 (probably)	Solinus	ii.28	Daughters of Aeetes
19		9	1 (probably)	OGR	xvi.3–4	Story of Ascanius
20	10	10	2 (probably)	Servius	Aen. viii.637–8	Origins of the Sabines
21	16	16		Dionysios	ii.72 § 2	Origin of the Fetiales
22	17	17		Dionysios	ii.76 § 5	Children of Numa
23	18	18		Dionysios	iv.6 § 4	Tarquinius Priscus' arrival to Rome
24	19	19		Dionysios	vi.11 §12	King Tarquinius in 496 BC
25	20	20		Dionysios	vii.1 § 3–4	Dionysios corrects Gellius on Hippocrates, 492 BC
26	21	21		Cicero	Div. i.55 (Note: The Wikisource edition uses an older numbering.)	Votive games of 490 BC
27	24	25		Macrobius	i.8 § 1	Rebuilding of the Temple of Saturn, 381 or 370 BC
28	30	26		Aulus Gellius	xviii.12 § 6	Episode of the First Punic War, c.250 BC
29	27	28		Macrobius	iii.17 § 3	Sumptuary law of Gaius Fannius Strabo, 161 BC
30	28	29		Censorinus	xvii.11	Dating of the third Secular Games, 146 BC
31	1	1		Historia Augusta	Probus i.1	
32	31	32		Charisius	68	
33	31	33		Charisius	68	
34	32	34		Charisius	90	
35	33	35		Servius	Aen. iv.390–1	Vocabulary of solar eclipses
36	33	35		Servius	Aen. iv.390–1	idem

== See also ==
- Annals & Annalists
- Roman historiography

== Bibliography ==
=== Ancient sources ===
- Marcus Tullius Cicero, De Divinatione, De Legibus.
- Aulus Gellius, Attic Nights.
- Plutarch, Parallel lives.

=== Modern sources ===
- Ernest Babelon, Description Historique et Chronologique des Monnaies de la République Romaine, Vulgairement Appelées Monnaies Consulaires, Paris, 1885.
- Ernst Badian, "The Early Historians", in Thomas Allen Dorey, Latin Historians, New York, Basic Books, 1966, pp. 1–38.
- T. Robert S. Broughton, The Magistrates of the Roman Republic, American Philological Association, 1951–1952.
- Martine Chassignet, L'Annalistique romaine. T. II : L'Annalistique Moyenne (Fragments), Paris, Les Belles Lettres, 1999.
- ——, "L'annaliste Cn. Gellius ou l'"heurématologie" au service de l'histoire", Ktèma, 24, 1999, pp. 85–91.
- Tim Cornell (editor), The Fragments of the Roman Historians, Oxford University Press, 2013.
- Bruce W. Frier, Libri Annales Pontificum Maximorum: The Origins of the Annalistic Tradition, Ann Arbor, University of Michigan Press, 1999 (first published in 1979).
- Friedrich Münzer: Gellius 4, in: Georg Wissowa, et alii (editors): Realencyclopädie der Classischen Altertumswissenschaft (abbreviated RE), vol. VII, 1, J. B. Metzler, Stuttgart, 1910, col. 998-1000.
- Hermann Peter, Historicorum Romanorum reliquiae, Leipzig, 1914.
- Elizabeth Rawson, "The First Latin Annalists", Latomus, T. 35, Fasc. 4 (oct.-déc. 1976), pp. 689–717.
- John Rich, "Fabius Pictor, Ennius and the Origins of Roman Annalistic Historiography", in Christopher Smith, Kaj Sandberg (editors), Omnium Annalium Monumenta: Historical Writing and Historical Evidence in Republican Rome, Leiden & Boston, Brill, 2017, pp. 17–65.
- Edward Allen Sydenham, The Coinage of the Roman Republic, London, Spink, 1952.
- G. J. Szemler, The Priests of the Roman Republic, A Study of Interactions, between Priesthoods and Magistracies, Bruxelles, Latomus, 1972.
