= De vita sua =

Autobiography of Marcus Aemilius Scaurus, consul in 115 BC

- Author: Marcus Aemilius Scaurus
- Language: Latin
- Genre: Autobiography
- Published: Likely 100-89 BC
- Publication place: Roman Republic

De vita sua ("On my life") is an autobiography written by Marcus Aemilius Scaurus (c. 161–c. 89 BC), a prominent statesman of the Roman Republic, notably consul in 115 BC and princeps senatus for a generation. Even though the book is lost and has only survived in seven small fragments, it is the first known autobiography in Roman history. Scaurus wrote his autobiography in order to defend his actions throughout his long career, during which he was at the centre of Roman politics, from the tribunates of Gaius Gracchus to the Social War, and engaged in bitter feuds with numerous enemies. Most scholars think that Scaurus wrote the autobiography towards the end of his life.

Although Scaurus' book was not particularly successful and already forgotten by the time of Cicero—a great admirer of Scaurus and his work, it marked the beginning of a long tradition of Roman politicians writing their memoirs or autobiographical accounts, such as Rutilius Rufus, Sulla, Caesar, Augustus, and later Roman emperors down to Septimius Severus.

== Description ==
Scaurus' book is the first known autobiography written by a Roman. Two of its fragments show that Scaurus used the first person, another striking innovation in Latin historiography. Few autobiographical texts are known before Scaurus; Scipio Africanus and Scipio Nasica Corculum wrote letters about their campaigns, which possibly used the first person, but they were a different genre and written in Greek. Some modern scholars suggested that Gaius Gracchus wrote a family history, but this theory has been doubted since Hermann Peter. Gaius Gracchus more likely wrote a biography of his elder brother Tiberius. The genre nonetheless existed in the Greek and Persian worlds since at least the 5th century, with the autobiography of Nehemiah, or the travels of Skylax.

De vita sua was written in three books, of which seven fragments have survived. Scaurus started his autobiography with his childhood, as a fragment mentions his meagre inheritance, which he told in order to emphasize the obstacles he had to overcome. Like most ancient autobiographies, De vita sua was apologetic—Scaurus wrote it to justify his actions during his tumultuous career. He was notably involved in up to 17 political trials. He likely included his own speeches in his book, a practice introduced by Cato the Censor in his Origines.

The majority of modern scholars think that Scaurus probably composed De vita sua towards the end of his life, in the 90s or early 80s, because Valerius Maximus relates several anecdotes from Scaurus' life that can be dated from this period. They therefore assume that these anecdotes came from De vita sua, which publication might have therefore been posthumous. However, Christopher Smith writes that Scaurus may have avoided telling about the later part of his life, which was full of trials and controversies. Instead, Scaurus perhaps told more about his military achievements, especially during his consulship of 115, which culminated with a triumph. He could have written his autobiography soon after, or rapidly passed over the rest of his political career.

Ernst Badian suggests that Scaurus was helped in the writing by a learned slave named Daphnis, whom Pliny the Elder said Scaurus bought for the record sum of 700,000 sesterces. This slave was perhaps later owned by Quintus Lutatius Catulus—another Roman statesman who wrote an autobiography; he might have even written a history book on his own right.

Scaurus dedicated his book to Lucius Fufidius, likely identified with a friend of the dictator Sulla; he later became praetor in 81. Fufidius belonged to a family of moneylenders from Arpinum that probably funded the political career of Scaurus, who in return supported their advancement to the senatorial order.

Scaurus' book inspired several later politicians to write their autobiography, including one of his opponents, Publius Rutilius Rufus, who like Scaurus had a tumultuous life and felt the need to justify himself. He might have even written his own biography in answer to Scaurus'. Rufus' autobiography was also entitled De vita sua, and likewise used the first person, but had a longer success than Scaurus'. Rufus was an exception though, most autobiographies of Roman politicians had a short life. In his dialogue Brutus (written in 46), Cicero indeed complains that Scaurus' book was already forgotten by his time. Cicero likely read the book in order to prepare the defence of Scaurus' son during a trial in 54, and frequently refers to Scaurus' life in the resulting Pro Scauro, doubtless with information taken from De vita sua. The later authors who cite Scaurus were only interested in grammatical peculiarities, and their citations are very short. Five fragments indeed come from grammarians of the Late Roman Empire: Servius, Charisius, and Diomedes—who cites Scaurus three times.

== List of fragments ==
Cornell n°	Peter n°	Chassignet n°	Scaurus' book n°	author	ref.	Subject
1	1	1	1	Valerius Maximus	iv. 4 § 11	Scaurus was poor during his youth.
2	2	2	3	Charisius	186	Unknown fiscal problem.
3	3	3	3	Diomedes	GL. i. 374	Scaurus avoids battle (1st person).
4	4	4	3	Diomedes	GL. i. 385	Grammatical point.
5	7	7		Frontinus	Strat. iv. 3 § 13	Discipline in Scaurus' army, perhaps in 115 BC.
6	5	5		Diomedes	GL. i. 377	Grammatical point.
7	6	6		Servius	Aen. xii. 121, 122	Scaurus orders to march in closed order (1st person).

== Bibliography ==
=== Ancient sources ===
- Cicero, Brutus.
- Charisius, Ars Grammatica.
- Diomedes, Grammatici Latini.
- Frontinus, Strategemata.
- Servius, In Vergilii Aeneidem commentarii (original in Latin on Wikisource).
- Valerius Maximus, Factorum ac Dictorum Memorabilium (original in Latin on Wikisource)..

=== Modern sources ===
- Ernst Badian, "The Early Historians", in Thomas Allen Dorey (editor), Latin Historians, Basic Books, New York, 1966, pp. 1–38.
- Larry Richard Bates, Memoirs and the Perception of History in the Roman Republic, PhD dissertation, University of Pennsylvania, 1983.
- T. Robert S. Broughton, The Magistrates of the Roman Republic, American Philological Association, 1951–1952.
- José M. Candau, "Republican Rome: Autobiography and Political Struggles", in Gabriele Marasco (editor), Political Autobiographies and Memoirs in Antiquity, Leiden/Boston, Brill, 2011, pp. 121–159.
- Martine Chassignet, L'Annalistique romaine. Tome II, L'annalistique moyenne (fragments), Paris : Les Belles Lettres, 2003. ISBN 9782251014180
- ——, L'Annalistique romaine. Tome III : L'Annalistique récente. L'Autobiographie politique (Fragments), Paris : Les Belles Lettres, 2004. ISBN 9782251014357
- Tim Cornell (editor), The Fragments of the Roman Historians, Oxford University Press, 2013.
- Arnaldo Momigliano, The Development of Greek Biography, Harvard University Press, 1971; revised and expanded, Harvard University Press, 1993.
- T. P. Wiseman, New Men in the Roman Senate, 139 B.C. - A.D. 14, Oxford University Press, 1971.
