= List of National Junior Classical League conventions =

This is a list of National Junior Classical League conventions.

List of Conventions
Year	School	City	Dates	Theme
1954	Incarnate Word High School	San Antonio, Texas	June 13–15	
1955	Iowa State Teachers College	Cedar Falls, Iowa	June 26–28	
1956	Miami University	Oxford, Ohio	June 24–26	
1957	Colorado College	Colorado Springs, Colorado	August 13–15	
1958	University of Michigan	Ann Arbor, Michigan	August 17–21	
1959	St. Olaf College	Northfield, Minnesota	August 9–12	
1960	University of New Mexico	Albuquerque, New Mexico	August 7–11	
1961	Indiana University	Bloomington, Indiana	August 13–17	Acta non verba. (Acts, not words; motto of the United States Merchant Marine Academy)
1962	Montana State College	Bozeman, Montana	August 5–9	
1963	University of Kansas	Lawrence, Kansas	August 11–15	
1964	University of Illinois	Urbana, Illinois	August 9–13	
1965	University of Southern California	Los Angeles, California	August 8–12	
1966	Western Kentucky State College	Bowling Green, Kentucky	August 7–11	
1967	University of Arizona	Tucson, Arizona	July 30-August 3	
1968	Michigan State University	East Lansing, Michigan	August 11–15	Otium cum dignitate. (Ease with dignity; from Cicero's Pro Sestius.)
1969	Tulane University Loyola University New Orleans	New Orleans, Louisiana	August 10–14	Una stella fata nostra coniungit. (One star joins our fates.)
1970	Ohio University	Athens, Ohio	August 2–6	
1971	University of Oklahoma	Norman, Oklahoma	August 8–12	
1972	Virginia Tech	Blacksburg, Virginia	August 6–10	Pax in terra. (Peace on Earth.)
1973	Claremont Colleges	Claremont, California	August 5–9	Unity in Diversity
1974	University of New Hampshire	Durham, New Hampshire	August 4–9	Fortiter, fideliter, feliciter. (Fearlessly, faithfully, successfully.)
1975	Ball State University	Muncie, Indiana	August 3–8	Forsan et haec olim meminisse iuvabit. (And perhaps it will be pleasing to have remembered these things one day; from Virgil's Aeneid.)
1976	University of Rochester	Rochester, New York	August 8–13	Nescire autem quid ante quam natus sis acciderit, id est semper esse puerum. (Not to know what happened before you were born is to be forever a child; from Cicero's Orator.)
1977	Florida State University	Tallahassee, Florida	July 31-August 5	Et quasi cursores vitai lampada tradunt. (As runners we pass on the torch of life; from Lucretius's De rerum natura.)
1978	North Texas State University	Denton, Texas	July 30-August 4	Mens invicta manet. (The mind remains unconquered.)
1979	Michigan State University	Lansing, Michigan	July 29-August 3	Bene cogitata si excidunt non occidunt. (Good ideas may fail but are not lost; from Publilius Syrus's Sententia.)
1980	University of Tennessee	Knoxville, Tennessee	August 2–7	Nullum saeculum magnis ingeniis clausum est. (No generation is closed to great talents; from Seneca.)
1981	Miami University	Oxford, Ohio	August 2–7	Curae mihi futura. (The care of the future is mine; motto of Hunter College.)
1982	University of Oklahoma	Norman, Oklahoma	August 1–6	Auro quaeque ianua panditur. (A golden key can open any door.)
1983	University of Rochester	Rochester, New York	August 7–12	Qui mare tenet, eum necesse est rerum potiri. (He who holds the sea must be master of the empire.)
1984	University of Richmond	Rochester, New York	July 30-August 4	Caelum certe patet, ibimus illi. (Surely the sky lies open, let us go that way; from Ovid's Metamorphoses.)
1985	University of New Hampshire	Durham, New Hampshire	July 29-August 3	Omnis ars naturae imitatio est. (All art is but an imitation of nature; from Seneca.)
1986	Indiana University	Bloomington, Indiana	August 3–8	Aurea prima sata est aetas, quae sponte sua, fidem rectumque colebat. (The golden age has been sown by itself, and cultivated faith and prosperity; from Ovid'sMetamorphoses.)
1987	Stetson University	DeLand, Florida	August 9–14	Nobilitas sola est atque unica virtus. (Virtue is the one and only nobility; from Juvenal's Satires.)
1988	University of Colorado	Boulder, Colorado	July 31-August 4	Amicitia. (Friendship.)
1989	Indiana University of Pennsylvania	Indiana, Pennsylvania	July 30-August 4	Unity in Diversity.
1990	University of North Texas	Denton, Texas	July 29-August 3	Forsan et haec olim meminisse iuvabit. (And perhaps it will be pleasing to have remembered these things one day; from Virgil's Aeneid.)
1991	Emory University	Atlanta, Georgia	August 4–9	Cura mihi futuri. (The care of the future is mine; motto of Hunter College.)
1992	San Diego State University	San Diego, California	August 2–7	Mens sana in corpore sano. (A healthy mind in a healthy body; from Juvenal's Satires.)
1993	Miami University	Oxford, Ohio	July 25–30	Nullius boni sine socio iucunda possessio est. (Nothing will ever please me, no matter how excellent or beneficial, if I must retain the knowledge of it to myself; from Seneca's Epistulae Morales ad Lucilium.)
1994	University of Tennessee	Knoxville, Tennessee	July 31-August 5	Occasionem oblatam tenete. (Seize the opportunity; from Cicero's Epistulae ad Familiares.)
1995	University of Kansas	Lawrence, Kansas	July 30-August 4	Aut viam inveniam aut faciam. (I shall either find a way or make one; from Hannibal.)
1996	Indiana University	Bloomington, Indiana	July 28-August 2	Nobilitas sola est atque unica virtus. (Virtue is the one and only nobility; from Juvenal's Satires.)
1997	North Dakota State University	Fargo, North Dakota	August 3–8	Aspirat primo fortuna labori. (Fortune smiles upon our first effort; from Virgil.)
1998	University of Massachusetts	Amherst, Massachusetts	July 26–31	Patria est communis omnium parens. (Our country is the common parent of all; from Cicero's De Officiis.)
1999	Florida State University	Tallahassee, Florida	August 1–6	Audentior ito qua tua te fortuna sinet. (Go boldly against it, as your fortune shall permit you; from Virgil's Aeneid.)
2000	University of Oklahoma	Norman, Oklahoma	August 1–6	Faber est suae quisque fortunae. (Every man is the maker of his own fortune; from Sallust.)
2001	Tulane University	New Orleans, Louisiana	July 17–22	Vultus ac frons animi ianua. (The face and its expression are the door of the soul; from Cicero's Commentariolum Petitionis.)
2002	University of Kentucky	Lexington, Kentucky	July 30-August 4	Magnos homines virtute metimur, non fortuna. (We measure great men by their virtue, not their fortune; from Cornelius Nepos.)
2003	Trinity University	San Antonio, Texas	July 29-August 3	Natura inest in mentibus nostris insatiabilis quaedam cupiditas veri videndi. (Nature has planted in our minds an insatiable desire to seek out the truth; from Book 1 of Cicero's Tusculanae Disputationes.)
2004	University of Richmond	Richmond, Virginia	July 26–30	Acta non verba. (Acts, not words; motto of the United States Merchant Marine Academy.
2005	University of Missouri	Columbia, Missouri	August 1–6	Nil sine magno labore. (Nothing without great effort; motto of Brooklyn College.)
2006	Indiana University	Bloomington, Indiana	July 31-August 5	Amicitiae nostrae memoriam spero sempiternam fore. (I hope that the memory of our friendship will be everlasting; from Cicero.)
2007	University of Tennessee	Knoxville, Tennessee	July 24–29	Carpe diem, quam minimum credula postero. (Seize the day, give as little trust in the future as possible; from Horace's Odes.)
2008	Miami University	Oxford, Ohio	July 28-August 2	Non nobis solum nati sumus. (Not for ourselves alone are we born; from Cicero's De Officiis.)
2009	University of California	Davis, California	July 27-August 1	Fortuna nobis vi animi tantum frenabitur. (The level of our success is limited only by our imagination; from Aesop.)
2010	North Dakota State University	Fargo, North Dakota	July 27-August 1	Non est ad astra mollis e terris via. (There is no easy way from the earth to the stars; from Seneca the Younger's Hercules.)
2011	Eastern Kentucky University	Richmond, Kentucky	July 25–30	Bene legere saecla vincere. (To read well is to master the ages; from Professor Isaac Flagg.)
2012	Wake Forest University	Winston-Salem, North Carolina	July 26–31	Dimidium facti qui coepit habet. (He who has begun is half done; dare to know; begin!; from Horace's First Book of Letters.)
2013	University of Nevada	Las Vegas, Nevada	July 22–27	Quid sit futurum cras, fuge quaerere, et quem fors dierum cumque dabit lucro appone. (Cease to inquire what the future has in store, and take as a gift whatever the day brings forth; from Horace's Odes.)
2014	Emory University	Atlanta, Georgia	July 28-August 2	Omnium enim rerum principia parva sunt. (For the beginning of all things are small; from Cicero's De Finibus Bonorum Et Malorum.)
2015	Trinity University	San Antonio, Texas	July 27-August 1	Tu ne cede malis, sed contra audentior ito. (You should not give in to evils, but proceed ever more boldly against them; from Virgil's Aeneid.)
2016	Indiana University	Bloomington, Indiana	July 25–30	Ubi concordia, ibi victoria. (Where there is unity, there is victory; from Publilius Syrus.)
2017	Troy University	Troy, Alabama	July 24–29	Omnis ars naturae imitatio est. (All art is but an imitation of nature; from Seneca.)
2018	Miami University	Oxford, Ohio	July 23–28	Ego sum hortari tantum possum ut amicitiam omnibus rebus humanis anteponatis. (I urge you, as much as I am able, to place friendship above all human issues; from Cicero's de Amicitia.)
2019	North Dakota State University	Fargo, North Dakota	July 26–31	Apes non sunt solitaria natura. (Bees are not of a solitary nature; from Varro's De Re Rustica.)
2020	University of Richmond	Richmond, Virginia	July 24–29	Note: Conducted virtually due to the COVID-19 pandemic Omnes...summa ope niti decet, ne vitam silentio transeant. (It benefits all to strive with greatest effort, lest they pass their lives in silence; from Sallust, Bellum Catilinae 1.1)
2021	San Diego State University	San Diego, California	July 26–31	Conducted virtually Sibi quisque ruri metit. (Each harvests one's own farm; from Plautus, Mostellaria 3.2)
2022	University of Louisiana at Lafayette	Lafayette, Louisiana	July 24–30	Cantantes licet usque (minus via laedit) eamus. (Let us go singing as far as we go – the road will be less tedious; from Vergil, Eclogues 9.64)
2023	Emory University	Atlanta, Georgia	July 23–28	Caelum, non animum, mutant qui trans mare currunt. (They who rush across the sea change their sky, not their soul; from Horace, Epistles 1.11)
2024	University of Tennessee	Knoxville, Tennessee	July 22–27	Multa, quae impedita natura sunt, consilio expediuntur. (Many things which are naturally difficult are solved by ingenuity; from Livy, Ab Urbe Condita 25.11)
2025	Miami University	Oxford, Ohio	July 21–26	Non scholae sed vitae discimus. (We learn not for school, but for life; from Seneca, Moral Letters to Lucillus)
2026	Indiana University	Bloomington, Indiana	July 21–26	Concordia parvae res crescunt. (In harmony, small things grow; from Sallust, Bellum Jugurthinum)
