= Cyril Robinson =

Cyril Robinson may refer to:

- Cyril Robinson (footballer) (1929–2019), English footballer
- Cyril Robinson (cricketer) (1873–1948), English cricketer
- Cyril E. Robinson, English historian, writer and teacher
