= Artoria gens =

Ancient Roman family

The gens Artoria was a minor plebeian family at ancient Rome. Few members of this gens are mentioned in history, but a number are known from inscriptions. Under the later Empire at least some of them were of senatorial rank.

== Origin ==
At least two distinct linguistic origins have been proposed for the nomen Artorius. Schulze, Herbig, and Salomies propose that the name is derived from the Etruscan praenomen Arnthur, perhaps Latinized as Artor. Other scholars have proposed a Messapic origin, identifying a nomen Artorres, "descendant of Artas", with a Messapic possessive suffix -orres, indicating filiation. Some scholars have suggested that Artorius might be the origin of the Welsh name Arthur.

== Praenomina ==
The chief praenomina of the Artorii were Lucius, Gaius, Marcus, and Quintus, four of the most common names throughout Roman history. Lesser-used praenomina of the Artorii included Gnaeus, Sextus, and Titus, and there are a few examples of other names.

== Branches and cognomina ==
The Artorii do not appear to have been divided into distinct families, but a number of them used common surnames, such as Secundus, typically designating a second or younger child, and its derivatives.

== Members ==
This list includes abbreviated praenomina. For an explanation of this practice, see filiation.

- Artorius, according to Quadrigarius, the antagonist of the Capuan knight, Cerrinus Vibellius Taurea, during the Second Punic War. In Livy, Taurea's opponent is Tiberius Claudius Asellus.
- Gaius Artorius, dedicated an altar to Venus at Minturnae in Latium, dating to the second century BC.
- Artoria, the former mistress of Gaius Artorius Dipilus.
- Gaius Artorius Ɔ. l. Dipilus, a freedman named in an inscription from Casilinum, dating to 84 BC.
- Artoria Monime, the wife of Gaius Valerius, was buried at Neapolis between 50 BC and AD 31.
- Marcus Artorius Asclepiades, a friend and physician of Octavian, whom he attended at the Battle of Philippi. He died in a shipwreck in 31 BC.
- Marcus Artorius Geminus, legate of Augustus, and prefect of the military treasury in AD 10.
- Marcus Artorius M. l. Philero, a freedman named in an inscription from Pompeii, dating to the latter part of the first century BC.
- Lucius Artorius C. f., a soldier in the nineteenth legion, named in an inscription from Caesena in Cisalpine Gaul, dating to the reign of Augustus.
- Artoria L. l. Cleopatra, a freedwoman named in an inscription from Caesena, dating to the reign of Augustus.
- Marcus Artorius M. f. Rufus Zopyrus, the husband of Artoria Callista, named in an inscription from Casilinum, dating to the first half of the first century AD.
- Lucius Artorius Sex. f. Sex. n., son of Sextus Artorius and Praeconia Posilla, buried in a family sepulchre at Ameria in Umbria, dedicated by his sister, Artoria Secunda, dating to the first third of the first century AD.
- Gaius Artorius Bassus, one of the municipal officials at Thugga in Africa Proconsularis, by AD 47 had been pontifex, aedile, and duumvir.
- Artoria M. l. Callista, a freedwoman, and the wife of Marcus Artorius Rufus Zopyrus, named in an inscription from Casilinum in Campania, dating to the first half of the first century AD.
- Artorius Q. f. Histrianus, one of the municipal duumvirs at Verona in Venetia and Histria, had held a number of civil posts, including quaestor of the treasury, during the early part of the first century AD.
- Marcus Artorius M. l. Secundus, a freedman buried at Rome with his wife, Clodia Apta, in the first half of the first century AD.
- Gaius Artorius Proculus, a grammarian whom Quintilian mentions among those who consider the trope a type of figure.
- Artorius Liberalis, named in an inscription from Pompeii.
- Marcus Artorius, one of the municipal duumvirs of Pompeii.
- Marcus Artorius, a gladiator named in an inscription from Pompeii.
- Marcus Artorius Stephanus, named in an inscription from Rome, dating between AD 31 and 70.
- Artoria Flaccilla, accompanied her husband, Decimus Novius Priscus, into exile in AD 65. Priscus was a friend of Seneca the Younger, whom the emperor Nero suspected of participating in the conspiracy of Gaius Calpurnius Piso.
- Artoria Harmonia, buried at Carthage in Africa Proconsularis, aged two, in a tomb dating between the reigns of Nero and the Flavian emperors.
- Artorius Maximus, dedicated a monument at Dyrrachium in Macedonia to his wife, Valeria Rufina, aged thirty-two, and their son, Artorius Rufinus, aged nineteen years, two months, dating from the latter half of the first century, or the first half of the second.
- Artorius Rufinus, son of Artorius Maximus and Valeria Rufina, buried at Dyrrachium, aged nineteen years, two months.
- Gaius Artorius, the father of Artoria Flora, according to an inscription from the early second century.
- Artoria C. f. Flora, named in an inscription from Flavia Solva in Noricum.
- Gnaeus Artorius Callistus, dedicated a monument at Rome to his wife, Volumnia Auxis, dating to the second half of the first century AD.
- Artoria Prima, wife of Clemens, an exhorter of a 'factio', was buried at Rome with a monument from her husband, dating to the second half of the first century AD.
- Marcus Artorius M. l. Primus, a freedman and architect, named in several inscriptions from Pompeii.
- Titus Artorius T. l. Faustus, a freedman named in an inscription from Canusium, dating to the first or early second century.
- Titus Artorius T. l. Fortunatus, a freedman named in an inscription from Canusium, dating to the first or early second century.
- Titus Artorius T. l. Rusticus, a freedman named in an inscription from Canusium, dating to the first or early second century.
- Gnaeus Artorius Victor, buried at Rome in the late first or early second century.
- Artoria Prima, named in an inscription from Rome, dating to the first or second century, together with her son, Montanus, and a Marcus Artorius Secundus.
- Marcus Artorius Secundus, named in an inscription from Rome, dating to the first or second century, together with Artoria Prima and her son, Montanus.
- Artorius Marcellinus, dedicated a second century monument at Placentia to his wife, Clodia Leon.
- Artorius Rufus, a grammarian quoted on several occasions by Festus.
- Artorius Valens, a native of Alexandria, was a soldier buried at Misenum, aged twenty-six, having served for six years, with a monument from Julia Agrippina, variously dated from around the reign of Nero, or the latter part of the second century.
- Artorius Saturninus, a native of Siscia, was Decurion of the Cohors I Lusitanorum, one of the auxilia stationed in Moesia Inferior. He was buried near the Tropaeum Trajani, aged forty-five, having served twenty-five years. His children, Gaius Artorius, Roscia Saturnina, and Artorius Saturninus, dedicated a monument in his memory, dating between AD 130 and 170.
- Gaius Artorius, one of the children of Artorius Saturninus, a soldier buried near the Tropaeum Trajani in Moesia Inferior.
- Artorius Saturninus, one of the children of Artorius Saturninus.
- Lucius Artorius Castus, a centurion in a number of legions and primus pilus of the Legio V Macedonica, was named prefect of the Fleet at Misenum, dux of detachments of the three British legions during an expedition against the Armenians, and governor of the province of Liburnia.
- Artorius Victor, dedicated a monument at Apulum in Dacia to his wife, Ulpia Maximilla, dating from the late second century.
- Artoria Euphraenusa, buried at Misenum in Campania, aged twenty-six, with a monument from her husband, Artorius Sabinus, dating from the late second century or the first half of the third.
- Artorius Sabinus, the husband of Artoria Euphraenusa.
- Gaius Artorius, named in a second- or third-century inscription from Bedriacum in Venetia and Histria.
- Lucius Artorius Hilarianus, named in a list of members of the boat-builders' guild at Ostia at the beginning of the third century.
- Titus Artorius Minervalis, named among the municipal officials of Canusium, in an inscription dating to AD 223.
- Artoria Privata, buried at Narona in Dalmatia, aged sixty, with a monument from her daughter, Aurelia Ursina, dating from the third century.
- Lucius Artorius Pius Maximus, governor of Asia at some point between AD 284 and 298, during the reign of Diocletian.
- Artorius Amachius, dedicated a tomb at Rome for his wife, Aurelia, and their family on the thirteenth day before the Kalends of December in AD 348.
- Artoria Frontima, named in a fourth or fifth-century funerary inscription from Salona in Dalmatia.
- Artorius Julianus Megethius, a senator named in a Christian inscription from Rome, dating to the fifth century. He was the husband of Accia or Maria Tulliana, granddaughter of the rhetorician Victorinus. They had a daughter, Tulliana.

=== Undated Artorii ===
- Artoria, the wife of Lucius Fabius Eutychus, a municipal official of equestrian rank at Ostia in Latium, and the mother of Gaius Domitius Fabius Hermogenes, who followed in his father's footsteps, holding a number of positions of responsibility.
- Artoria M. l., a freedwoman named in an inscription from Grumentum in Lucania.
- Artorius, named in a funerary inscription from Salona in Dalmatia.
- Artorius, mentioned in an inscription from the present village of El Ghouiba, formerly in Africa Proconsularis.
- Gaius Artorius C. f., dedicated a monument at Ateste in Regio X to Appaea Montana, a freedwoman.
- Gnaeus Artorius Cn. f., named in an inscription from Carthage in Africa Proconsularis.
- Marcus Artorius, named in an inscription from Placentia in Cisalpine Gaul.
- Marcus Artorius M. l., a freedman named in an inscription from Rome.
- Marcus Artorius, freedman of Hyginus, named in an inscription from Aquileia in Venetia and Histria.
- Quintus Artorius Q. f., named in an inscription from Interamnia Praetuttiorum in Picenum.
- Publius Artorius, named in an inscription from Thibilis in Numidia.
- Sextus Artorius Sex. f., husband of Praeconia Posilla, and father of Sextus, Lucius, and Artoria Secunda, who built a family sepulchre at Ameria.
- Sextus Artorius Sex. f. Sex. n., son of Sextus Artorius and Praeconia Posilla, buried in a family sepulchre at Ameria.
- Artorius Abscantus, buried at Rome, with a monument dedicated by Prepusa, a freedwoman.
- Artorius Adiutor, son of Gaius Artorius Secundus and Artoria Doxa Euhodia, buried at Rome, aged one year, four months, fifteen days, and ten hours.
- Gnaeus Artorius Agathopus, buried at Brixellum, with his wife, Briccia Pieris, children, Fortunatus and Ingenua, his wife's freedwoman, Amanda, and nurse Doris.
- Quintus Artorius Amemptus, buried at Rome, with a monument from his wife, Artoria Veneria.
- Quintus Artorius Antiochus, named in an inscription from Rome.
- Quintus Artorius Antiochus Priscus
- Artoria Aphrodisia, buried at Tarentum in Calabria.
- Gaius Artorius Atimetus, buried at Rome, with a monument from his wife, Artoria Felicula.
- Artoria L. f. Atticilla, daughter of Lucius Artorius Atticus and Villia Faustina, buried at Rome, aged seven years, four months, and twenty-seven days.
- Lucius Artorius Atticus, husband of Villia Faustina, and father of Artoria Atticilla, for whom he dedicated a monument at Rome.
- Marcus Artorius M. l. Auctus, a freedman buried at Rome.
- Artoria Auxesis, the wife of Marcus Minatius Gallus, one of the municipal duumvirs at Visentium in Etruria.
- Artoria Basilia, buried at Rome, together with her husband, Quintus Artorius Pamphilus.
- Artorius Capito, the father of Artoria Longina, Artorius Felix, and Artorius Capito, named in an inscription from Ostia.
- Artorius Capito, son of Artorius Capito, named in an inscription from Ostia.
- Gaius Artorius C. f. Celer, an Epicurean philosopher, buried at Sicca Veneria in Africa Proconsularis, aged thirty-two.
- Gaius Artorius Celer Munatianus brother of the Epicurean philosopher.
- Lucius Artorius L. l. Chrysanthus, a freedman named in an inscription from Canusium in Apulia.
- Gaius Artorius Cilo, named in an inscription from Puteoli in Campania.
- Artoria Corinthias, together with Lucius Tiburtius Tyrannus, dedicated a monument at Rome to their patron, Lucius Tiburtius Telesphorus, and freedman, Lucius Tiburtius Atticus.
- Quintus Artorius Crescens, buried at Rome, with a monument from his wife, Turuntia Sabina, dating to the second century.
- Publius Artorius Docilis, a standard-bearer in the fourteenth urban cohort, dedicated a monument at Rome to Publius Herennius Macedo, a soldier in the same cohort.
- Artoria Doris, dedicated a monument at Rome to her daughter, Ulpia Marcia, a slave of the imperial household, aged thirteen years, seven months, and twenty-one days.
- Artoria Doxa Euhodia, buried at Rome, aged about twenty-eight, with her son, Artorius Adiutor, and a monument from her husband, Gaius Artorius Secundus.
- Artoria Egloge, dedicated a monument at Rome to her son, Cydimus, aged two.
- Artorius Eunus, a freedman buried at Rome, with his wife, Artoria Eutychia.
- Artoria Euplia, the wife of Gaius Julius Sabinus, with whom she dedicated a monument at Ravenna for Marcus Helvius Maximus, a soldier in the praetorian guard.
- Artoria Eutychia, a freedwoman buried at Rome, with her husband, Artorius Eunus.
- Artoria Faustina, buried at Sigus in Numidia, aged seventy-five, with her husband, Marcus Sittius Honoratus, aged fifty-five.
- Sextus Artorius Faustus, named in an inscription from Rome.
- Artoria Felicula, dedicated a monument at Rome to her husband, Gaius Artorius Atimetus.
- Artoria S. f. Felicula, buried at Rome, together with Gnaeus Pompeius Antigonus.
- Artorius Felix, son of Artorius Capito, named in an inscription from Ostia.
- Artorius Felissimus, dedicated a monument at Narona to Aemilia Barbara, his wife of fifty-six years.
- Marcus Artorius Festus Concessianus, buried at Hippo Diarrhytus in Africa Proconsularis, aged seventy-five.
- Artoria Firma, a freedwoman named in an inscription from Aquileia in Venetia and Histria.
- Lucius Artorius C. f. Florentinus, buried at Lalla Dahlia in Africa Proconsularis, aged sixty-five.
- Decimus Artorius S. f. Fructus, a goldsmith buried at Rome, aged twenty-seven.
- Marcus Artorius M. l. Hilarus, a freedman named in an inscription from Grumentum.
- Marcus Artorius Honoratus, buried at Aquae Flavianae in Numidia, aged eighty.
- Gnaeus Artorius Hyginus, buried at Thacia in Africa Proconsularis, aged fifty-one.
- Quintus Artorius Itamus, buried at Rome, aged fifteen, with a monument from his sister, Laelia Stilbe.
- Artoria Januaria, buried at Auzia in Mauretania Caesariensis, aged eighty.
- Gaius Artorius Julius Augendus, one of the quaestors in charge of the aerarium. (Note: Memoriae formula is attested from the second century onwards.)
- Lucius Artorius L. l. Licinus, a freedman named in an inscription from Caesena.
- Artoria Longina, daughter of Artorius Capito, named in an inscription from Ostia.
- Gaius Artorius Maximus, a soldier in the fourth legion, dedicated a monument at Nazareth in Syria Palaestina to Gaius Julius Quartus, another soldier in the same legion, aged thirty, having served ten years.
- Marcus Artorius Melanthus, buried at Rome, with a monument dedicated by Hilara.
- Titus Artorius Modestus, buried at Narbo in Gallia Narbonensis.
- Artoria Namses, buried at the present site of Sers, formerly in Africa Proconsularis.
- Lucius Artorius L. l. Nicephor, a freedman buried at Herdonia in Apulia.
- Gaius Artorius Orta[...], son of Valeria Tertia, named in an inscription from Narbo.
- Quintus Artorius Q. l. Pamphilus, a freedman buried at Rome with his wife, Artoria Basilia.
- Publius Artorius Pastor, a native of Alexandria, was a soldier buried at Blera in Etruria, aged thirty-two, having served twelve years, with a monument dedicated by Aponius Maximus.
- Quintus Artorius Phoebus, named in an inscription from Rome.
- Artorius Primitivus, husband of Valentia Flora, with whom he dedicated a monument at Rome to their son, aged twenty-two years, two months, and nineteen days.
- Artoria L. f. Prisca, buried at Biglia in Venetia and Histria, together with her mother, Minucia Maxima, grandfather, Manius Minucius, and Lucius Livius.
- Marcus Artorius M. f. Priscillus Vicasius Sabidianus, a military tribune with the seventh legion.
- Lucius Artorius Priscus, the husband of Minucia Maxima, and father of Artoria Prisca.
- Artoria C. f. Procula, buried at Narbo with her husband, Titus Pompeius Venustus, and children, Titus Pompeius Proculus, and Pompeia Venusta.
- Artoria Riparia, buried at Cirta in Numidia, aged one hundred.
- Marcus Artorius Rufus, a suboptio serving in an unidentified unit, mentioned in an inscription found at the church of San Lorenzo in Cesarea, in Ravenna.
- Marcus Artorius M. l. Scindalamus, a freedman named in an inscription from Grumentum.
- Artoria Sex. f. Sex. n. Secunda, daughter of Sextus Artorius and Praeconia Posilla, built a family sepulchre at Ameria for her parents, and her brothers, Sextus and Lucius.
- Artoria Secundina, the wife of Gellius Felix, and mother of Lucius Gellius Artorius, buried at Salona, aged eight years and nine months.
- Artoria Secundina, (Note: This inscription is suspiciously similar to that of the other Artoria Secundina, suggesting that one of them is from a cenotaph, or has been moved, and that one of the readings is erroneous.) the wife of Decimus Sellius Felix, and mother of Lucius Sellius Artorius, buried at Laus Pompeia in Gallia Transpadana, aged eight years and nine months.
- Gaius Artorius Secundus, dedicated a monument at Rome to his wife, Artoria Doxa Euhodia, and son, Artorius Adiutor.
- Gaius Artorius Simplicianus, buried at Uchi Maius in Africa Proconsularis, aged twenty-one.
- Gaius Artorius Simplicius, buried at Uchi Maius, aged seventy.
- Lucius Artorius Solon, dedicated a monument at Rome to his wife, Sessia Fortunata, aged thirty-one years, seven months, and twenty-three days.
- Artoria Tertulla, the wife of Titus Fullonius Firmus, and mother of Titus Fullonius Justus, for whom she and her husband dedicated a monument at Ravenna.
- Gaius Artorius Tertullus, flamen at Thubursicum in Africa Proconsularis, where he dedicated monuments to his wife, Titania Primula, aged forty-three, and son, Gaius Artorius Tertullus, aged fourteen.
- Gaius Artorius C. f. Tertullus, buried at Thubursicum, aged fourteen.
- Lucius Artorius Tyranus, buried at Rome, aged forty-four years, ten months, and twenty-three days, with a monument from his wife, Fulvia Lacaena.
- Artoria Veneria, wife of Quintus Artorius Amemptus, for whom she dedicated a monument at Rome.
- Quintus Artorius Q. f. Vettus, buried at Turgalium in Lusitania, aged five.
- Marcus Artorius Zethus, buried at Aquileia.
- Artoria Zoë, dedicated a monument at Rome to her son, Lupercianus, aged six years, fourteen days.

== See also ==
- List of Roman gentes

== Bibliography ==
- Quintus Claudius Quadrigarius, Annales, fragments collected by Hermann Peter, in Historicorum Romanorum Reliquiae (Fragments of Roman Historians), B.G. Teubner, Leipzig (1914).
- Titus Livius (Livy), History of Rome.
- Marcus Velleius Paterculus, Roman History.
- Publius Cornelius Tacitus, Annales.
- Sextus Pompeius Festus, Epitome de M. Verrio Flacco de Verborum Significatu (Epitome of Marcus Verrius Flaccus' On the Meaning of Words).
- Gaius Julius Phaedrus, Fabularum Aesopiarum (Aesop’s Fables).
- Marcus Fabius Quintilianus (Quintilian), Institutio Oratoria (Institutes of Oratory).
- Eusebius Sophronius Hieronymus (St. Jerome), In Chronicon Eusebii (The Chronicon of Eusebius).
- Caelius Aurelianus, Celerum Passionum, or De Morbis Acutis (translation of Soranus of Ephesus, On Acute Diseases).
- Archivio Storico Pugliese (Historical Archive of Apulia, abbreviated ASP) (1948–present).
- L'Année épigraphique, René Cagnat et alii (eds.), Presses Universitaires de France (1888–present).
- Inscriptiones Christianae Urbis Romanae Septimo Saeculo Antiquiores, Giovanni Battista de Rossi (ed.), Vatican Library, Rome (1857–1861, 1888).
- Corpus de Incripciones Latinas de Cáceres, Julio Esteban Ortega, (ed.), Universidad de Extremadura (2007–2013).
- Corpus Inscriptionum Latinarum (The Body of Latin Inscriptions, abbreviated CIL), Theodor Mommsen et alii (eds.), Berlin-Brandenburgische Akademie der Wissenschaften (1853–present).
- Corporis Inscriptionum Latinarum Supplementa Italica (Italian Supplement to the Corpus Inscriptionum Latinarum), Ettore Pais (ed.), Rome (1884).
- Bulletin Archéologique du Comité des Travaux Historiques et Scientifiques (Archaeological Bulletin of the Committee on Historic and Scientific Works, abbreviated BCTH), Imprimerie Nationale, Paris (1885–1973).
- Dictionary of Greek and Roman Biography and Mythology, William Smith, ed., Little, Brown and Company, Boston (1849).
- Inscriptiones Aquileiae, Giovanni Battista Brusin (ed.), Udine (1991–1993).
- Inscriptiones Daciae Romanae (Inscriptions from Roman Dacia, abbreviated IDR), Bucharest (1975–present).
- Inscriptions Latines de L'Algérie, Stéphane Gsell (ed.), Edouard Champion, Paris (1922–present).
- Notizie degli Scavi di Antichità (News of Excavations from Antiquity, abbreviated NSA), Accademia dei Lincei (1876–present).
- Scripta Judaïca Cracoviensia (abbreviated SJC), Jagiellonian University Press, Kraków (2002–present).
- Supplementum Epigraphicum Graecum (Supplement of Greek Epigraphy, abbreviated SEG) (1923–present).
- Anthony Birley, The Roman Government of Britain, Oxford (2005), p. 355
- Licia Vlad Borelli, Un Impegno per Pompei, Mailand (1983).
- Marcella Chelotti, Vincenza Morizio, and Marina Silvestrini, Le epigrafi romane di Canosa (The Roman Epigraphy of Canusium), vol. 1, Edipuglia srl (1990).
- Gustav Herbig, Tituli Faleriorum Veterum Linguis Falisca et Etrusca Conscripti, Barth (1910).
- Paolo Liverani and Giandomenico Spinola, Le Necropoli Vaticane. La Città dei Morta di Roma (The Vatican Necropolis: The City of the Dead of Rome), Mailand (2010).
- Xavier Loriot, "Un mythe historiographique: l'expédition d'Artorius Castus contre les Armoricains", Bulletin de la Société nationale des antiquaires de France (1997).
- Olli Salomies, Die römischen Vornamen: Studien zur römischen Namenbung, Societas Scientiarum Fennica, Helsinki (1987).
- Ciro Santoro, "Per la nuova iscrizione messapica di Oria", in La Zagaglia, A. VII, No. 27, pp. 271–293 (1965); "La Nuova Epigrafe Messapica", in Ricerche e Studi, vol. 12, pp. 45–60 (1979).
- Wilhelm Schulze, Zur Geschichte lateinischer Eigennamen (The History of Latin Proper Names), Weidmannsche Buchhandlung, Berlin (1904).
- R.S.O. Tomlin, Britannia Romana: Roman Inscriptions and Roman Britain, Oxbow (2018).
- Gustav Wilmanns, Inscriptiones Africae Latinae (Latin Inscriptions from Africa, abbreviated ILAfr), Georg Reimer, Berlin (1881).
