= Roman historiography =

Science of Roman historical writing

During the Second Punic War with Carthage, Rome's earliest known annalists Quintus Fabius Pictor and Lucius Cincius Alimentus recorded history in Greek, and relied on Greek historians such as Timaeus. Roman histories were not written in Classical Latin until the 2nd century BCE with the Origines by Cato the Elder. Contemporary Greek historians such as Polybius wrote about the rise of Rome during its conquest of Greece and ascension as the primary power of the Mediterranean in the 2nd century BCE. Moving away from the annalist tradition, Roman historians of the 1st century BCE such as Sallust, Livy, and even Julius Caesar wrote their works in a much fuller narrative form. While Caesar's De Bello Gallico focused specifically on his wars in Gaul, Roman works that served as a broad universal history often placed heavy emphasis on the origin myth of the founding of Rome as a starting point. These works formed the basis of the Roman historiographic models utilized by later Imperial authors of the Principate era, such as Tacitus and Suetonius.

== History ==
=== Foundation ===
The first non annalystic historian of Rome was in fact Greek, Polybius who wrote at the end of the second century BC who was prominent in the Achaean League. Upon being captured by the Romans and transported to Rome, Polybius took it upon himself in his Histories to record the history of Rome in order to explain Roman tradition to his fellow Greeks. He wanted to convince them to accept the domination of Rome as a universal truth.

Before the Second Punic War (218–201 BCE) Rome didn't have native historians, but the clash of civilisations it involved proved a potent stimulus to historiography, which was taken up by the two senators (and participants in the war), first by Quintus Fabius Pictor and later by Lucius Cincius Alimentus, as the first Roman historians they may be considered the "founders" of Roman historiography. Both authors—whose works have survived only in fragments—wrote in Greek, not Latin. One of the motives for this choice of language was a desire to win the support of the Greeks, among whom there were pro-Carthaginian authors. Additionally, Greek was seen as a sufficiently developed language for a topic as serious as history, while, according to some authors, Latin prose remained at a less developed stage.

Pictor's style of writing history defending the Roman state and its actions, and using propaganda heavily, eventually became a defining characteristic of Roman historiography, while he is also known for the establishment of the ab urbe condita tradition of historiography which is writing history "from the founding of the city". After Pictor wrote, many other authors followed his lead, inspired by the new literary form: Gaius Acilius, Aulus Postumius Albinus, and Cato the Elder. Cato the Elder was the first historian to write in Latin. His work, the Origines, was written to teach Romans what it means to be Roman. Like Pictor, Cato the Elder wrote ab urbe condita, and the early history is filled with legends illustrating Roman virtues. The Origines also spoke of how not only Rome, but the other Italian towns were venerable, and that the Romans were indeed superior to the Greeks.

The Romans enjoyed serious endeavors and so the writing of historiography became very popular for upper class citizens who wanted to spend their time on worthwhile, virtuous, "Roman" activities. As idleness was looked down upon by the Romans, writing history became an acceptable way to spend their otium or retirement.

Almost as soon as historiography started being used by the Romans, it split into two traditions: the annalistic tradition and the monographic tradition.

=== The annalistic tradition ===
The authors who used the Annalistic tradition wrote histories year-by-year, from the beginning, which was most frequently from the founding of the city, usually up until the time that they were living in, copying the style of the annales maximi were kept by the pontifex maximus until the time of the Gracchi.

Some annalistic authors:

- Gnaeus Gellius (c. 140 BC) wrote his history from Aeneas until 146 BC.
- Lucius Calpurnius Piso Frugi (c. 133 BC) wrote to demonstrate the reasons for the decline of Roman society. His history chronicled Rome from its foundation until 154 BC, which he regarded as the lowest point of Roman society. Cicero described Piso's work as "annals, very jejunely written".
- Publius Mucius Scaevola (c. 133 BC) wrote a history from the foundation of the city in 80 books.
- Sempronius Asellio (c. 100 BC) wrote a history from the Punic Wars until c. 100 BC, as a patriotic encouragement.
- Quintus Claudius Quadrigarius wrote mainly about warfare, mainly taking the patriotic line that all Roman wars are just, and that the Senate and all Roman dealings were honorable.

=== The monographic tradition ===
Monographs are more similar to present-day history books. They are usually on a single topic, but most importantly, they do not tell history from the beginning, and they are not even necessarily annalistic. An important sub category that emerged from the monographic tradition was the biography.

Some monographic authors:

- Gaius Gracchus wrote a biography of his brother, Tiberius Gracchus.
- Gaius Fannius also wrote a biography of Tiberius Gracchus, but showed him in a negative light.
- Lucius Coelius Antipater wrote a monograph on the Second Punic War, notable for its improved style and efforts at fact-checking.
- Sallust wrote two monographs: Bellum Catilinae (also known as De Catilinae Coniuratione), which is about the Catilinarian conspiracy from 66 to 63 BC, and the Bellum Jugurthinum, which is about the war with Jugurtha which took place from 111 to 105 BC.

=== Factionalized history ===
Often, especially in times of political unrest or social turmoil, historians re-wrote history to suit their particular views of the age. So, there were many different historians each rewriting history a little bit to bolster their case. Starting with the Gracchi brothers, This was especially evident in the 70s BC with the conflict between the populists led by Marius, and the senatorials led by Sulla. Several authors wrote histories during this time, each taking a side. Gaius Licinius Macer was anti-Sullan and wrote his history, based on Gnaeus Gellius in 16 books, from the founding of the city until the 3rd century BC, whereas Valerius Antias who was pro-Sulla, wrote a history in 75 books, from the founding of the city until 91 BC: both were used subsequently by Livy to create a more evenly balanced account.

During the long crisis that ended the Roman Republic, historians such as Sallust and Livy attributed the Republic’s collapse primarily to the elite's moral decay following Rome’s expansion. Cicero, influential on Roman historians despite never writing a history, emphasized the erosion of constitutional norms. The imperial period Greek historian Appian of Alexandria in his Roman History put less emphasis on moral or constitutional decline and instead traced the Republic’s instability to social and material pressures.

This habit of using the past to justify the positions in the present was reinforced by the greater preponderance of public men in writing Roman history.

Sallust a prominent ally of Julius Caesar during the crisis of the Roman Republic in his two surviving works focused on moral decline, with Bellum Catilinae using Catiline as a symbol of the corrupt Roman nobility and Bellum Jugurthinum using the Jugurthine War as a backdrop for his examination of the development of party struggles in Rome in the 1st century BC having a number of character studies such as Marius. Sallust he is largely responsible for our current image of Rome in the late republic, and our understanding of the moral and ethical realities of Rome in the 1st century BC would be much weaker if Sallust's works did not survive.

Dio Cassius was a distinguished Greek senator. After establishing his political career, Dio Cassius began to write various literary works. His most famous and recognized work is called the Roman History, which consists of 80 books. This work is dominated by the change from a Roman republic to a monarchy of emperors, which Dio Cassius believed was the only way Rome could have a stable government. Today, the only surviving portion of the Roman History is the part from 69 BC to 46 AD.

Julius Caesar’s histories illustrate how history was used for political self-justification in the late Republic. In the Commentarii de Bello Gallico, to defend his conduct against Optimate opponents, Caesar presents the Gallic Wars as defensive with the narrative selectively emphasizes his leadership and moral legitimacy, shaping reader sympathy through detail and diction. Written in the form of commentarii rather than traditional historiography, the work exemplifies how accounts of contemporary events could be rhetorically shaped to serve factional and personal ends. A similar strategy is evident in the Commentarii de Bello Civili, where Caesar presents his conduct during the civil war as a defense of his lawful authority and Roman liberty, despite the greater difficulty of justifying conflict against fellow Romans. Other accounts of Caesar’s wars survive in the same commentarii style, including De Bello Alexandrino, De Bello Africo and De Bello Hispaniensi which are generally regarded as continuations composed by contemporaries or near-contemporaries rather than by Caesar himself.

=== Augustinian historians ===
- Diodorus Siculus was a Greek historian of the 1st century BC. His main body of work was the Bibliotheca, which consisted of forty books and was intended to be a universal history from mythological times to the 1st century BC. He employed a very simple and straightforward style of writing, and relied heavily on written accounts for his information, most of which are now lost. Often criticized for a lack of originality and deemed a "scissors and paste" historian, Diodorus endeavored to present a comprehensive human history in a convenient and readable form.
- Dionysius of Halicarnassus (fl. c. 8 BC.) was a Greek historian and critic living in Rome. His major work was Roman Antiquities, a history of Rome from its mythical beginnings until the first Punic war, consisting of 20 books. Generally he is considered to be a less reliable source than most of the other historians, but he does fill in the gaps in Livy's accounts. Other works include: On Imitation, On Dinarchus, On Thucidides, and On the Arrangement of Words. His framework of Rome being strong because of its constitution influenced later writers such as Cicero.

=== Early Imperial historiography ===
==== Livy ====
Titus Livius, commonly known as Livy, was a Roman historian, best known for his work entitled Ab Urbe Condita, which is a history of Rome "from the founding of the city". He was born in Patavium, which is modern day Padua, in 59 BC and he died there in 17 AD. His contemporary Pollio disparaged him for his "patavinitas", referring to his use of local and coarse words. Little is known about his life, but based on an epitaph found in Padua, he had a wife and two sons. We also know that he was on good terms with Augustus and he also encouraged Claudius to write history.

Ab Urbe Condita covered Roman history from its founding, commonly accepted as 753 BC, to 9 BC. It consisted of 142 books, though only books 1–10 and 21–45 survive in whole, although summaries of the other books and a few other fragments exist. The books were referred to as "decades" because Livy organized his material into groups of ten books. The decades were further split in pentads:

- Books 1–5 cover from the founding to 390 BC.
- Books 6–10 cover 390–293 BC.
- Though we do not have books 11–20, evidence suggests that books 11–15 discussed Pyrrhus and books 16–20 dealt with the First Punic War.
- Books 21–30 cover the Second Punic War:
  - 21–25 deal with Hannibal.
  - 26–30 deal with Scipio Africanus.
- The wars against Philip V in Greece are discussed in books 31–35.
- The wars against Antiochus III in the east in books 36–40.
- The Third Macedonian War is dealt with in books 40–45.
- Books 45–121 are missing.
- Books 121–142 deal with the events from 42 through 9 BC.

The purpose of writing Ab Urbe Condita was twofold. The first was to memorialize history and the second was to challenge his generation to rise to that same level. He was preoccupied with morality, using history as a moral essay. He connects a nation's success with its high level of morality, and conversely a nation's failure with its moral decline. Livy believed that there had been a moral decline in Rome, and he lacked the confidence that Augustus could reverse it. Though he shared Augustus' ideals, he was not a "spokesman for the regime". He believed that Augustus was necessary, but only as a short term measure.

According to Quintillian, Livy wrote lactea ubertas, or "with milky richness". He used language to embellish his material, including the use of both poetical and archaic words. He included many anachronisms in his work, such as tribunes having power that they did not have until much later. Livy also used rhetorical elaborations, such as attributing speeches to characters whose speeches could not possibly be known. Though he was not thought of as a first-rate research historian, being overly dependent on his sources, his work was so extensive that other histories were abandoned for Livy. It is unfortunate that these other histories were abandoned, especially since much of Livy's work is now gone, leaving holes in our knowledge of Roman history.

==== Tacitus ====
Tacitus was born c. 56 AD in, most likely, either Cisalpine or Narbonese Gaul. Upon arriving in Rome, which would have happened by 75, he quickly began to lay down the tracks for his political career. By 88, he was made praetor under Domitian, and he was also a member of the quindecimviri sacris faciundis. From 89 to 93, Tacitus was away from Rome with his newly married wife, the daughter of the general Agricola. 97 saw Tacitus being named the consul suffectus under Nerva. It is likely that Tacitus held a proconsulship in Asia. His death is datable to c. 118.

There is much scholarly debate concerning the order of publication of Tacitus' works; traditional dates are given here.

- 98 – Agricola (De vita Iulii Agricolae). This was a laudation of the author's father-in-law, the aforementioned general Cn. Iulius Agricola. More than a biography, however, can be garnered from the Agricola: Tacitus includes sharp words and poignant phrases aimed at the emperor Domitian.
- 98 – Germania (De origine et situ Germanorum). "belongs to a literary genre, describing the country, peoples and customs of a race" (Cooley 2007).
- c. 101/102– Dialogus (Dialogus de oratoribus). This is a commentary on the state of oratory as Tacitus sees it.
- c. 109 – Histories. This work spanned the end of the reign of Nero to the death of Domitian. Unfortunately, the only extant books of this 12–14 volume work are 1–4 and a quarter of book 5.
- Unknown – Annales (Ab excessu divi Augusti). This is Tacitus' largest and final work. Some scholars also regard this as his most impressive work. The date of publication and whether it was completed at all are unknown. The Annales covered the reigns of Tiberius, Caligula, Claudius, and Nero. Like the Histories, parts of the Annales are lost: most of book 5, books 7–10, part of book 11, and everything after the middle of 16. Tacitus' familiar invective is also present in this work.

Tacitus' style is very much like that of Sallust. Short, sharp phrases cut right to the point, and Tacitus makes no bones about conveying his point. His claim that he writes history "sine ira et studio" ("without anger and partiality") (Annales I.1) is not exactly true. Many of his passages ooze with hatred towards the emperors. Despite this seemingly obvious partisan style of writing, much of what is said can go under the radar, which is as Tacitus wanted things to be. His skill as an orator, which was praised by his good friend Pliny, no doubt contributes to his supreme mastery of the Latin language. Not one to mince words, Tacitus does not waste time with a history of Rome ab urbe condita. Rather, he gives a brief synopsis of the key points before he begins a lengthier summary of the reign of Augustus. From there, he launches into his scathing account of history from where Livy would have left off.

==== Suetonius ====
Gaius Suetonius Tranquillus (Suetonius) is most famous for his biographies of the Julio-Claudian and Flavian emperors and other notable historical figures. He was born around 69 to an equestrian family. Living during the times of the Emperor Trajan and having a connection to Pliny the Younger, Suetonius was able to begin a rise in rank in the imperial administration. In c. 102, he was appointed to a military tribune position in Britain, which he did not actually accept. He was, though, among the staff for Pliny's command in Bithynia. During the late period of Trajan's rule and under Hadrian, he held various positions, until he was discharged. He had a close proximity to the government as well as access to the imperial archives, which can be seen in his historical biographies.

Suetonius wrote a large number of biographies on important literary figures of the past (De Viris Illustribus). Included in the collection were notable poets, grammarians, orators, historians, and philosophers. This collection, like his other works, was not organized chronologically. Not all of it has survived to the present day, but there are a number of references in other sources to attribute fragments to this collection.

His most famous work, though, is the De Vita Caesarum. This collection of twelve biographies tells the lives of the Julio-Claudian and Flavian Emperors, spanning from Julius Caesar to Domitian. Other than an introductory genealogy and a short summary of the subject's youth and death, the biographies do not follow a chronological pattern. Rather than chronicling events as they happened in time, Suetonius presents them thematically. This style allowed him to compare the achievements and downfalls of each emperor using various examples of imperial responsibilities, such as building projects and public entertainment. However, it makes dating aspects of each emperor's life and the events of the early Roman Empire difficult. It also completely removes the ability to extrapolate a causal sequence from the works. Suetonius's purpose was not a historical recount of events, though, but rather an evaluation of the emperors themselves.

Suetonius's style is simple; he often quotes directly from sources that were used, and artistic organization and language does not seem to exist, though subtler skills have been detected by some. He addresses points directly, without flowery or misleading language, and quotes from his sources often. However, he is often criticized that he was more interested in the interesting stories about the emperors and not about the actual occurrences of their reigns. The style, with which he writes, primarily stems from his overarching purpose, to catalogue the lives of his subjects. He was not writing an annalistic history, nor was he even trying to create a narrative. His goal was the evaluation of the emperors, portraying the events and actions of the person while they were in office. He focuses on the fulfillment of duties, criticizing those that did not live up to expectations, and praising bad emperors for times when they did fulfill their duties.

There are a variety of other lost or incomplete works by Suetonius, many of which describe areas of culture and society, like the Roman Year or the names of seas. However, what we know about these is only through references outside the works themselves.

==== Other Early Imperial historians ====
- Pliny the Elder, uncle of Pliny the Younger, wrote in the 1st century AD. He was an officer in the Roman military who died in the eruption of Mount Vesuvius in 79 AD. His known works include Naturalis Historia, which is a collection of books on natural history, Bella Germanica, a 21 book history of the German wars which occurred during his lifetime, and a 31 book history of Julio-Claudian Rome.
- Titus Flavius Josephus (born 39 AD) was a Jewish historian and apologist. His works include The Jewish War (75 to 79), Antiquities of the Jews (93), The Life of Flavius Josephus (95) and Against Apion (Publication date unknown). He was influenced by Thucydides and Polybius and was endorsed by the Emperor Titus. Though many critics thought that he was a traitor to his people, his writings show that he was a zealous defender of the Jewish faith and culture. He is notable for being the primary source on the Second Temple Period, the First Jewish-Roman War and for mentioning Jesus of Nazareth, James the Just and many other New Testament figures.
- Velleius Paterculus was a Roman historian who lived from around 19 BC to after 30 AD. He wrote Historiae Romanae, which is a summary of Roman history from the founding of the city to 30 AD. Though almost all of his work is now missing, it is still a valuable source on the reigns of Augustus and Tiberius. He "represents the adulatory type of history condemned by Tacitus, who ignores Velleius, as do all ancient authorities".

=== Late Antiquity ===
In Late Antiquity, a great quantity of breviaria, or short historical works, were produced such as Aurelius Victor, Eutropius, Festus and the Epitome de Caesaribus. These concise histories may have drawn on a common source, the so-called Enmannsche Kaisergeschichte (Enmann's History of the Emperors, named after the German scholar Alexander Enmann, who first theorized its existence), which is now lost.

The Historia Augusta is a collection of imperial biographies covering the period from 117 to 284. Although it claims multiple authorship (including Aelius Spartianus, Julius Capitolinus, Vulcacius Gallicanus, Aelius Lampridius, Trebellius Pollio, and Flavius Vopiscus Syracusanus), modern scholarship generally considers it the work of a single anonymous author. Much of its material has been shown to be unreliable, and the work is commonly regarded as a mixture of fact and fiction.

Ammianus Marcellinus composed a history in thirty-one books, sometimes translated as The Roman History or The Roman Empire, covering the period from the reign of Nerva to the Battle of Adrianople. Although the first thirteen books are lost, the surviving portion incorporates the author’s own experiences in military service and is noted for its vivid descriptions of geography, events, and historical actors. There is ongoing scholarly debate as to whether Ammianus intended his work as a continuation of Tacitus.

Zosimus was a pagan historian writing around 500 AD, whose six-book history of Rome extended to the year 410. While generally regarded as inferior in literary and analytical quality to Ammianus, Zosimus is nevertheless an important source for events following 378.

Other Late Antiquity Historians include Orosius, Sulpicius Severus, Priscus and Olympiodorus of Thebes.

=== Overview ===
The historiography we most readily identify with the Romans, coming from sources such as Caesar, Sallust, Livy, Tacitus, and other minor authors, owes much to its early roots and Greek predecessors. However, contrary to the Greek form, the Roman form included various attitudes and concerns that were considered strictly Roman. As the recording of Roman history began to evolve and take shape, many characteristics came to define what we know today as Roman historiography, most notably the strong defense of and allegiance to the Roman state and its wide variety of moral ideals, the factional nature of some histories, the splitting of historiography into two distinct categories, the Annals and the Monograph, and the rewriting of history to suit the author's needs.

== Characteristics ==
Annals are a year-by-year arrangement of historical writing. In Roman historiography, annals generally begin at the founding of Rome. Proper annals include whatever events were of importance for each year, as well as other information such as the names of that year's consuls, which was the basis by which Romans generally identified years. The annals seem originally to have been used by the priesthood to keep track of omens and portents.

The Annales Maximi were a running set of annals kept by the Pontifex Maximus. The Annales Maximi contained such information as names of the magistrates of each year, public events, and omens such as eclipses and monstrous births. The Annales Maximi covers the period from the early Roman Republic to around the time of the Gracchi, though the authenticity of much of the material (as eventually published) cannot be guaranteed. A monograph is a comprehensive work on a single subject. The monograph could be written about a single event, a technique, rhetoric, or one of any number of other subjects. For example, Pliny the Elder once published a monograph on the use of the throwing-spear by cavalry. Monographs were among the most common historical works found in Roman writings.

Ab urbe condita, literally "From the founding of the city", describes the Roman tradition of beginning histories at the founding of the city of Rome. In Livy's Ab Urbe Condita, much time is spent on the early history of Rome, and on the founding of the city itself. In Sallust's histories, the founding and early history of Rome is almost reduced to a single sentence. Thus, the ab urbe condita form is extremely variable while continuing to mould Roman histories.

"Senatorial History" describes history written by or with information from a Roman Senator. Senatorial histories are generally particularly informative due to their "insider's" perspective. A general pattern of Senatorial histories is that they seem to invariably contain a reason that the author is writing histories instead of remaining involved in politics. Sullan annalists politicized their past. They were partisans of the Sullan faction who carried on the Marius and Sulla conflict through their histories, often rewriting them to fit their own agenda. Some Sullan annalists may have been sources for Livy. Valerius Antias (fl. 80-60 BC) was a Sullan annalist but he was not viewed as a credible historian. He seems to have been trying to counter the Marian historian, C. Licinius Macer, whose veracity is also questionable. Antias' history, written in seventy-six books, is melodramatic and often filled with exaggerations and lies: Livy wrote of "Valerius, who is guilty of gross exaggerations of numbers of all kinds". In his history, anyone named Cornelius is considered a hero and anyone named Claudius is an enemy, and the opposition to the populares never went by a consistent name but were instead called "boni", "optime" or "optimates", implying that they were the good guys.

Roman historiography is also very well known for subversive writing styles. The information in the ancient Roman histories is often communicated by suggestion, innuendo, implication and insinuation because their attitudes would not always be well received, as with Tacitus’ attitude to Tiberius. Tacitus was critical of the emperors and believed that they were one of the reasons for the decline of Rome, and even wrote disparagingly of Augustus the most revered of the emperors.

In Roman historiography commentarii is simply a raw account of events often not intended for publication. It was not considered traditional "history" because it lacked the necessary speeches and literary flourishes. Commentarii was usually turned into "history" later on. Many think Caesar's account of the Gallic Wars, Commentarii Rerum Gestarum (Commentaries on Things Done), was called commentarii for propagandistic purposes. They believe that it is actually "history" since it is so well written, pro-Roman and fits the traditional patterns of historiography.

Ancient Roman historians did not write for the sake of writing, they wrote in an effort to convince their audiences. Propaganda is ever present and is the function of Roman historiography. Ancient Roman historians traditionally had personal and political baggage and were not disinterested observers. Their accounts were written with the specific moral and political agendas. For example, Q. Fabius Pictor started the tradition of historiography that was concerned with both morality and history and affirmed the prestige of Roman state and its people.

Ancient Roman historians, starting with Polybius, wrote pragmatic histories in order to benefit future statesmen. The philosophy of pragmatic history treats historical happenings with special reference to causes, conditions and results. In Roman Historiography the facts and an impression of what the facts mean are presented. Interpretation is always a part of historiography; Romans never made any pretense about it. Conflict between the facts and the interpretation of those facts indicate a good historian.

== See also ==
- Ancient history
- Ancient literature
- Hellenic historiography
- Historiography of Romanisation

== Sources ==
- Brunt, Peter Astbury (1988). The fall of the Roman Republic and related essays. Oxford: Clarendon Press. ISBN 0-19-814849-6. OCLC 16466585.
- Cooley, Alison E. Introduction. The Annals of Imperial Rome. By Tacitus. Trans. Alfred John Church and William Jackson Brodribb. New York: Barnes & Noble, 2007.
- Ewan, Colin. Caesar: De Bello Gallico 1. London: Bristol Classical Press, 2002.
- Gould, H.E. and Whiteley, J.L. Livy: Book 1. 9th ed. London: Bristol Classical Press, 2001.
- Hadas-Lebel, Mireille. Translated by Richard Miller. Flavius, Josephus: Eyewitness to Rome's First Century Conquest of Judea. New York: Macmillan Publishing Company, 1993.
- Hornblower, Simon; Spawforth, Antony, eds. (1999). The Oxford Classical Dictionary (3rd ed.). Oxford: Oxford University Press. ISBN 9780198661726.
  - Pelling, Christopher (1999). "Historiography, Roman". The Oxford Classical Dictionary (3rd ed.). Oxford: Oxford University Press. pp. 716–717. ISBN 9780198661726.
  - Cornell, Tim J. (1999). "Annales Maximi". The Oxford Classical Dictionary (3rd ed.). Oxford: Oxford University Press. p. 98. ISBN 9780198661726.
- Lintott, Andrew (1994). "The Crisis of the Republic: Sources and Source-Problems". In Crook, J. A.; Lintott, Andrew; Rawson, Elizabeth (eds.). The Cambridge Ancient History, Volume IX: The Last Age of the Roman Republic, 146–43 BC. Cambridge: Cambridge University Press. pp. 1–15. doi:10.1017/CHOL9781139054379.002.
- Lendering, Jona (2003). "Appian". Livius.org. Livius.org.
- McGushin, Patrick. Sallust: Bellum Catilinae. 3rd ed. London: Bristol Classical Press, 1995.
- Miller, N.P. Tacitus: Annals 1. London: Bristol Classical Press, 1992.
- Polybius. The Histories I. Trans. W. R. Paton. Cambridge, Massachusetts: Harvard University Press, 1967.
- Straumann, Benjamin (2016). Crisis and Constitutionalism: Roman Political Thought from the Late Republic to the Age of Augustus. Cambridge University Press. ISBN 9781107082496.
- Walbank, F. W. Polybius. Berkeley: University of California Press, 1972.
- Williams, Guy (2015). "The Historiography of the Late Roman Republic". Saber and Scroll: 57–67.
