= Marcus Artorius Asclepiades =

Ancient Roman physician who saved Augustus's life

Marcus Artorius Asclepiades was physician of ancient Rome of the Artoria gens who was one of the followers of Asclepiades of Bithynia, and afterwards became the physician of the Roman emperor Augustus. The historian Plutarch describes Artorius and Augustus as having been friends (philoi). He was said in some sources to have had several other very notable patients such as Mark Antony, Marcus Licinius Crassus, and Cicero.

Artorius attended Augustus -- then simply known as Octavian -- in the latter's campaign against Marcus Junius Brutus and Gaius Cassius Longinus in 42 BCE. Several ancient writers tell an anecdote of Artorius saving Octavian's life during it, including Augustus himself, in his memoirs.

The story is that at the Battle of Philippi, while Octavian was stricken with sickness in his tent, Artorius was said to have had a dream of the goddess Athena, who commanded him to get Octavian, despite his sickness, to the front lines with his men (or, alternatively, simply to flee to a nearby marsh). Octavian followed this advice, saving his life, as shortly thereafter the forces of Brutus and Cassius broke through to the camp and ransacked Octavian's tent, expecting to find him there.

We next hear of Artorius eleven years later, having drowned in a shipwreck in the aftermath of the Battle of Actium, in 31 BCE.

We otherwise know little about his life. Historically he was said to have come from Smyrna, but the inscription on which this assertion was based is believed by modern scholars to have been fake.

The 2nd-century theologian and philosopher Clement of Alexandria quotes a work by a person of the same name, On Great Excellence (περὶ Μακροξιοτίας), which may or may not be the same person.
