= Gellia gens =

Ancient Roman family

The gens Gellia was a plebeian family at ancient Rome, where they settled after the Second Punic War (Note: Gelius, found on some coins, appears to be an extremely rare variant.) or earlier. The first of the Gellii to obtain the consulship was Lucius Gellius Poplicola, in 72 BC, but the most famous member of this gens is probably the grammarian Aulus Gellius, who flourished during the second century AD.

== Origin ==
The Gellii were of Samnite origin, and the first of this name mentioned in history was the general Statius Gellius, who was captured together with his army in 305 BC, during the Second Samnite War. Another general, Gellius Egnatius, fought against Rome during the Third Samnite War. The family does not appear to have settled at Rome before the end of the Second Punic War, but probably arrived soon afterward. The earliest Gellius mentioned at Rome is Gnaeus Gellius, the accuser of Lucius Turius, who was defended by Cato the Censor.

== Branches and cognomina ==
During the Republic, the only cognomina used by the Gellii were Canus and Poplicola or Publicola. The former surname means "white" or "light grey", most likely referring to someone with very light hair, or hair that had become preternaturally white; it belongs to a large class of cognomina derived from the physical characteristics of an individual.

Poplicola means "one who courts the people," and is most famous as the surname of Publius Valerius Publicola, one of the first consuls in 509 BC, and his descendants, although the surname occasionally appears in other gentes. This surname may have entered the Gellia gens because Lucius Gellius Poplicola, the consul of 72 BC, was descended from the Valerii, or because he married into the Valerii, or perhaps adopted his son, the consul of 36 BC, from the Valeria gens.

== Members ==
This list includes abbreviated praenomina. For an explanation of this practice, see filiation.

- Statius Gellius, a Samnite general during the Third Samnite War. He was defeated and captured by the consuls, along with his entire army, in 305 BC.
- Gellius Egnatius, (Note: It is not entirely clear if Gellius is his nomen or his praenomen, since both Gellius and Egnatius were the names of Samnite gentes.) a Samnite general during the Third Samnite War. He forged alliances with the Etruscans, Gauls, and Umbrians, but was finally defeated and slain at the Battle of Sentinum in 295 BC.
- Gnaeus Gellius, who accused Lucius Turius, who was defended by Cato the Elder. He was probably the father of the historian Gnaeus Gellius, with whom he is frequently confused.
- Gnaeus Gellius Cn. f., a historian who flourished during the second century BC. He seems to have paid careful attention to chronology and to the legends associated with the founding of Rome, although his history continued down to at least 145 BC. He was triumvir monetalis in 138.
- Quintus Gellius Canus, a friend of Titus Pomponius Atticus, initially proscribed by the triumvirs, but removed from the list by Marcus Antonius, who was a friend of Atticus.
- (Gellia) Cana, probably the daughter of Quintus Gellius Canus, was mentioned by Cicero as a potential wife for his nephew, the younger Quintus Tullius Cicero.
- Publicius Gellius, a jurist, and one of the followers of Servius Sulpicius Rufus. His full name and relationship, if any, to the Gellii, is uncertain.
- Aulus Gellius, a celebrated grammarian, who would have flourished during the reigns of Hadrian, Antoninus Pius, and Marcus Aurelius. He is best remembered for his Noctes Atticae, or "Attic Nights", a rambling collection of topics, anecdotes, and quotations from other ancient authors that interested him.
- Gellius Fuscus, the author of a Life of Tetricus Junior, quoted by Trebellius Pollio.

=== Gellii Poplicolae ===
- Lucius Gellius L. f. L. n., (Note: The unreliable Chronograph of 354 gives him the surname Poplicola, but this must be a confusion with the consul of 36 BC, who was probably his adoptive son.) consul in 72 BC, during the war against Spartacus. He must have reached a great age, as he was the contubernalis of the consul Gaius Papirius Carbo in 120 BC, and was still living in 55 BC, when Cicero speaks of him as his friend.
- Gellius L. f. L. n., brother of the consul Lucius, was a stepson of Lucius Marcius Philippus, consul in 91 BC. He spent his life in dissipation, and was an intimate of Clodius.
- Lucius Gellius, was a man of dubious reputation, having been accused of committing incest with his stepmother.
- Lucius Gellius L. f. L. n. Poplicola, consul in 36 BC, (Note: In an earlier reading of fragmentary consular fasti, Gellius and his colleague, Marcus Cocceius Nerva, were assigned to the beginning of AD 40, succeeded by Celer and Quinctilianus, now known to have been suffecti in AD 38, rather than 40.) was probably the natural son of a Valerius Messalla. After the death of Caesar, Gellius took the side of the republicans, but joined conspiracies against both Brutus and Cassius. Twice pardoned, he then switched sides and supported the triumvirs. He probably died in the Battle of Actium.
- Gellius Poplicola, quaestor under the proconsul Gaius Junius Silanus in Asia, was later among Silanus' accusers, leading to his banishment in AD 22.

== See also ==
- List of Roman gentes

== Bibliography ==
- Titus Livius (Livy), History of Rome.
- Marcus Tullius Cicero, Epistulae ad Atticum (Letters to Atticus).
- Cornelius Nepos, The Life of Atticus.
- Publius Cornelius Tacitus, Annales.
- Aulus Gellius, Noctes Atticae (Attic Nights).
- Aelius Lampridius, Aelius Spartianus, Flavius Vopiscus, Julius Capitolinus, Trebellius Pollio, and Vulcatius Gallicanus, Historia Augusta (Augustan History).
- Dictionary of Greek and Roman Biography and Mythology, William Smith, ed., Little, Brown and Company, Boston (1849).
- George Davis Chase, "The Origin of Roman Praenomina", in Harvard Studies in Classical Philology, vol. VIII, pp. 103–184 (1897).
- Michael Crawford, Roman Republican Coinage, Cambridge University Press (1974, 2001).
- Ernst Badian, "The Clever and the Wise: Two Roman Cognomina in Context", Bulletin of the Institute of Classical Studies, vol. 35, supp. 51, pp. 6–12 (1988).
- John C. Traupman, The New College Latin & English Dictionary, Bantam Books, New York (1995).
