= Statius Gellius =

Late 4th century Samnite general

Statius Gellius (fl. 305 BC) was a Samnite general who fought against the Romans, in the Second Samnite War. He was defeated and taken prisoner in 305 BC, at the Battle of Bovianum.

== See also ==
- Gellia gens
- Gellius Egnatius
- Aulus Gellius
