= Quintus Claudius Quadrigarius =

1st century BC Roman historian and writer

Quintus Claudius Quadrigarius was a Roman historian. Little is known of his life, but he probably lived in the 1st century BCE.

== Work ==
Quadrigarius's annals spanned at least 23 books. They began with the conquest of Rome by the Gauls (c. 390 BCE), reached Cannae by Book 5, and ended with the age of Sulla, c. 84 or 82 BCE.

The surviving fragments of his work were collected by Hermann Peter. The largest fragment is preserved in Aulus Gellius, and concerns a single combat between T. Manlius Torquatus and a Gaul.

== Legacy ==
Quadrigarius's work was considered very important, especially for the contemporary history he narrates. From its sixth book onward, Livy's History of Rome used Quadrigarius and Valerius Antias as major sources, (if not uncritically), and it seems Livy especially drew on Quadrigarius for trophies placed in the Capitoline temple and lost before Livy's time in the fire of 83 BCE. He is cited by Aulus Gellius, and he was probably the "Clodius" mentioned in Plutarch's Life of Numa.

The judgment of his prose has varied. Some considered that it was his lively style which ensured his survival in various extracts; but more perhaps would agree with Fronto that his language was pure and colloquial (“puri ac prope cotidiani sermonis”), and that it benefited from its straightforwardness, and absence of archaisms.

== See also ==
- Lucius Coelius Antipater
