= L'Annalistique romaine =

1996–2004 series by Martine Chassignet

L'Annalistique romaine is a three-volume collection of scholarly editions of fragmentary Roman historical texts edited by Martine Chassignet, a professor of history and specialist in historiography at Nancy 2 University. Begun in 1996, the series was completed in 2004. Chassignet also provides a French translation of the works; her work supplants what was until then the standard edition, the Historicorum Romanorum reliquiae by Hermann Peter, published between 1870 and 1914. Chassignet, whose 1986 edition of Cato the Elder's Origines was praised by critics, acknowledged Peter's as the model for her edition, which for the most part has the same selection of authors and texts.

In the middle of the twentieth century there were repeated calls (including by Felix Jacoby, editor of a similar collection of Greek fragments, Fragmente der griechischen Historiker) for an updated, revised edition of the fragments. Chassignet's edition is praised for its judicious and conservative commentary and its standard of scholarship. At the same time, one reviewer remarked that the "historiographical edifice" of Peter's edition is retained in Chassignet's edition, and that the practice of regarding problems of authorship as necessary and soluble should be recast into "a more permissive approach, which allows readers to make sense for themselves of the possibilities for diverse readings of these mutilated ghosts." Other editors besides Chassignet have taken up the project of publishing the important fragments of Roman literary tradition, including E. Courtney (Fragmentary Latin Poets) and Henrica Malcovati (Oratorum Romanorum Fragmenta); a multi-volume edition of such texts, The Fragmentary Roman Historians, edited by a team of British scholars under the direction of Tim Cornell from the University of Manchester was announced as in press in 2011 with Oxford UP.

== Contents ==
1. Les annales des Pontifes et l'annalistique ancienne
2. L'annalistique moyenne
3. L'annalistique recente. L'autobiographie politique
