= Cyril Robinson (cricketer) =

South African cricketer and clergyman

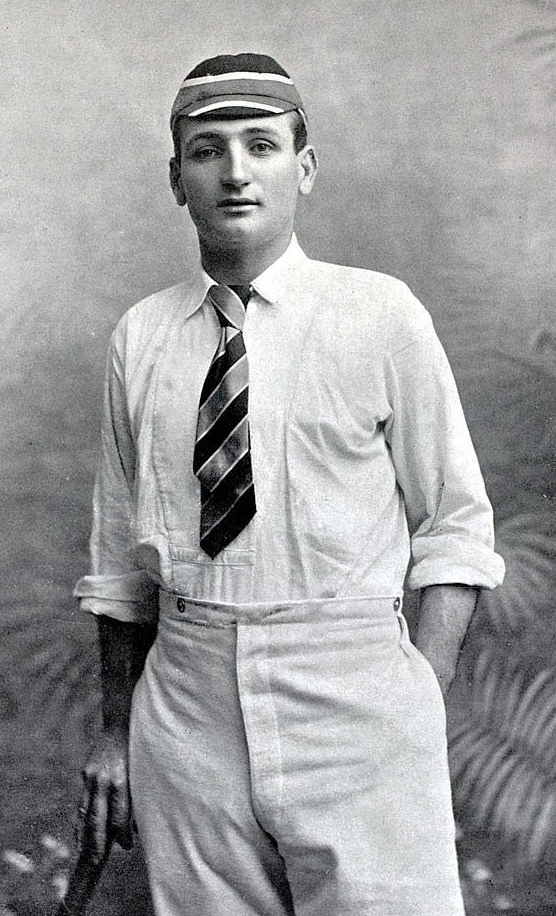

Personal information
- Full name: Cyril Deason Robinson
- Born: 18 July 1873; Durban, Natal Province, South Africa
- Died: 25 August 1948 (aged 75); Botha's Hill, Natal Province, South Africa
- Batting: Right-handed
- Bowling: Wicket-keeper

Domestic team information
- Years: Team
- 1905/06–1910/11: Natal
- 1895–1907: Buckinghamshire
- 1895–1896: Cambridge University

Career statistics
Competition	First-class
Matches	30
Runs scored	542
Batting average	12.60
100s/50s	–/–
Top score	41
Balls bowled	–
Wickets	–
Bowling average	–
5 wickets in innings	–
10 wickets in match	–
Best bowling	–
Catches/stumpings	36/19
- Source: Cricinfo, 11 May 2011

Cyril Deason Robinson (18 July 1873 – 25 August 1948) was a South African and English cricketer and clergyman.

== Biography ==
Robinson was born in Durban, Natal Province, the son of Frederic Sidney Robinson, the Archdeacon of Durban. He was educated at Hilton College in Natal and St John's College, Cambridge.

Robinson was a right-handed batsman who fielded as a wicket-keeper. He made his first-class debut for Cambridge University against CI Thornton's XI in 1901. He played 8 further first-class matches for the university, the last coming against Nottinghamshire in 1896. In between the end of the 1895 season and the start of the 1896 season, Robinson toured the United States with F Mitchell's XI, making 3 first-class appearances: one against a University of Pennsylvania Past and Present team and two against the Gentlemen of Philadelphia. In the same season that he made his debut for Cambridge University, he also made his debut for Buckinghamshire against Oxfordshire. Robinson played 2 further Minor counties matches for Buckinghamshire in 1895 and 1896, before playing 2 further fixtures in 1907.

Robinson later appeared in first-class cricket for his native Natal in 1906 against the Marylebone Cricket Club. He played first-class cricket for Natal from 1906 to 1911, making his final first-class appearance against Transvaal. He also played first-class cricket for the South Africans in their tour of the British Isles in 1907, although he played in some tour matches, he didn't feature in any Test matches. He also played once for the Rest of South Africa. In total, Robinson appeared in 30 first-class matches, scoring 542 runs at a batting average of 12.60, with a highest score of 41. Behind the stumps he took 36 catches and made 19 stumpings.

Robinson was ordained an Anglican priest in England in 1898. He served as a curate in Walworth before returning to South Africa, where he served as a curate in Durban from 1899 to 1904. He was in charge of the Native Mission in Ladysmith for most of the period from 1904 to 1924, and was also the principal of St Chad's College in Modderspruit from 1913 to 1924. He was Superintendent of Native Missions in Pietermaritzburg from 1924 to 1946, and canon of St Saviour's Cathedral, Pietermaritzburg, from 1926 to 1946.

He married Agnes Hallowes in 1905. He died in Botha's Hill, Natal, on 25 August 1948. His brother Leo and his cousins Lewis and Patrick Addison also played first-class cricket, as did his nephew Victor Robinson.
