= Bellum Catilinae =

Literary work by Sallust

War of Catiline
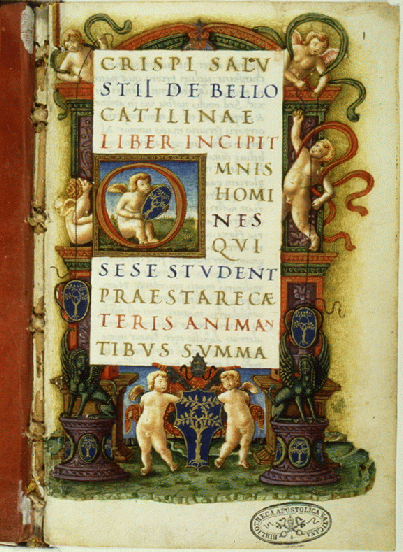
- Illuminated incipit page of a manuscript copy of De bello Catilinae made by Bartolomeo San Vito for Bernardo Bembo in 1471–84, now kept in the Vatican Library
- Author: Sallust
- Original title: Bellum Catilinae
- Language: Latin
- Publication date: c. 43–40 BC

Bellum Catilinae (War of Catiline), also called De coniuratione Catilinae (Conspiracy of Catiline), is the first history published by the Roman historian Sallust. The second historical monograph in Latin literature, it chronicles the attempted overthrow of the government by the aristocrat Catiline in 63 BC in what has been usually called the Catilinarian conspiracy.

The narrative of the monograph was seized upon as illustrating the moral and social decadence of the ruling Roman classes, particularly the Roman Senate. Sallust continually critiques Roman corruption throughout his narration.

== Summary ==
The history begins with a brief preface on the nature of man, history, and a brief autobiography of Sallust himself. Afterwards, Sallust launches into a character description of Catiline, who is portrayed as at once heroic and immoral, and then a description of Catiline's intention to gain kingship at any cost. However, Sallust tells his readership that Catiline's political ambitions were thwarted several times in his youth, and perhaps alludes to the First Catilinarian conspiracy, and he finally resorts to rebellion, during which attempts to recruit a number of bankrupt nobles and politically dissatisfied plebeians. The Senate eventually discovers the conspiracy, and attempts to put it down militarily. In the one and only battle of the rebellion, Catiline is killed by the Roman army, bringing the rebellion to an end.

Sallust uses the figure of Catiline as a symbol of the corrupt Roman nobility, though he also presents a wider picture of the Roman political scene beyond Catiline himself.

== Publication ==
Bellum Catilinae was probably written during the last half of the 1st century BC. After writing it, Sallust went on to author Bellum Jugurthinum, a historical account of the Jugurthine War.

== Legacy ==
G. W. S. Barrow has shown that one passage in the Declaration of Arbroath was carefully written using different parts of Bellum Catilinae as the direct source:

...for, as long as but a hundred of us remain alive, never will we on any conditions be brought under English rule. It is in truth not for glory, nor riches, nor honours that we are fighting, but for freedom – for that alone, which no honest man gives up but with life itself.

== Translations ==
The following are some translations of Bellum Catilinae, sorted reverse chronologically.

- Sallust (2022). How to Stop a Conspiracy: An Ancient Guide to Saving a Republic. Ancient Wisdom for Modern Readers. Translated by Osgood, Josiah. New Jersey: Princeton University Press. ISBN 978-0-691-21236-4.
- Sallust (2013). Ramsey, John T. (ed.). The War with Catiline. The War with Jugurtha. Loeb Classical Library 116. Translated by Rolfe, J. C. Cambridge: Harvard University Press. ISBN 978-0-6749-9684-7. Update to Rolfe's earlier Loeb; major changes made to Latin text and translations.
- Sallust (2010). Catiline's conspiracy, the Jugurthine War, Histories. Translated by Batstone, William Wendell. Oxford University Press. ISBN 978-0-19-161252-7. OCLC 759007075.
- Sallust (2008). Catiline's War, The Jurgurthine War, Histories. Translated by Woodman, A. J. Penguin Classics. ISBN 978-0-1404-4948-8.
- Sallust (1931) [1921]. "The War with Catiline". The War with Catiline. The War with Jugurtha. Loeb Classical Library 116. Translated by Rolfe, J. C. Cambridge: Harvard University Press. ISBN 0-6749-9128-1 – via LacusCurtius.
- Sallust (1881). "Conspiracy of Catiline". Sallust, Florus, Velleius Paterculus: literally translated with copious notes and general index. Harper's Classical Library. Translated by Watson, John Selby. New York: Harper & Brothers – via Perseus.
