= Bellum Jugurthinum =

Literary work by Sallust

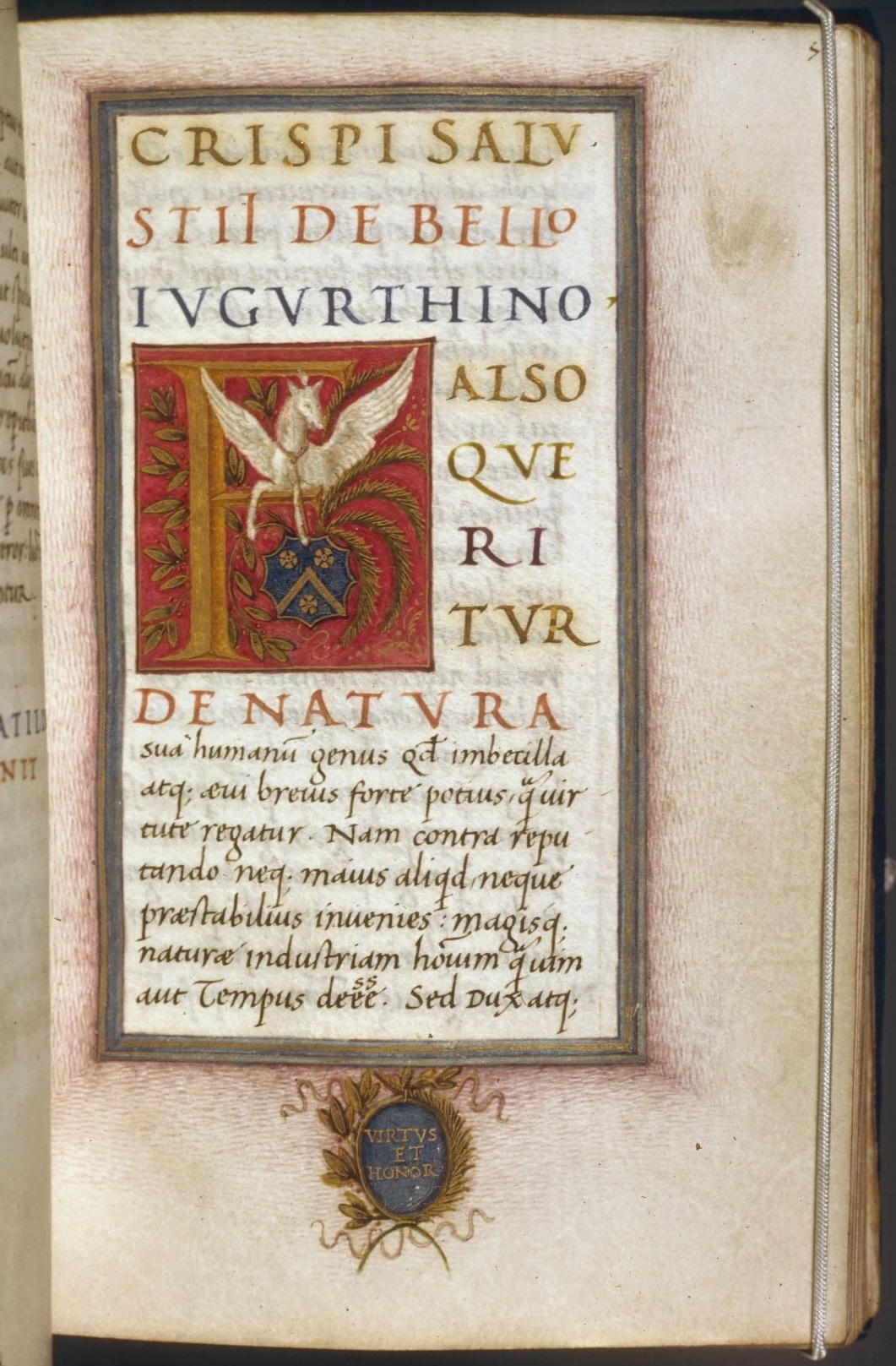
- Manuscript of De Bello Iugurthino, c. 1490
- Author: Sallust
- Language: Latin
- Genre: Essay, historical monograph
- Publication date: c. 40 BCE

The Bellum Jugurthinum, also known as De Bello Iugurthino, is a historical monograph by the Roman historian Sallust, published around 41 BCE. It is considered the most comprehensive historical source on the events of the Jugurthine War between the Roman Republic and Numidia, led by King Jugurtha. Similar to the earlier Bellum Catilinae, the Bellum Jugurthinum criticizes corruption in ancient Rome, describing how Jugurtha was able to repeatedly bribe Roman officials during the war and arguing that this was indicative of a broader moral decline in the late Roman Republic.

== Background and structure ==
=== Title and narrative ===
The Bellum Jugurthinum was written and published c. 40 BCE (Note: Sallust certainly began writing after 44 BC, the year of Caesar's death, at a time when the first tensions between Octavian and Antony were also emerging. In 33 BC, two years after the historian’s death, these tensions would result in a civil war that would engage ethnic forces and impressive ideological currents. (Gaius Sallustius Crispus, Lidia Storoni Mazzolani (ed.). The Conspiracy of Catiline. Biblioteca Universale Rizzoli (BUR), Milan 1997, p. 212, ISBN 978-88-17-12072-2).) and was passed down by direct tradition through medieval codices. (Note: The manuscripts of the two Sallustian monographs are divided into integri and mutili. The mutili are characterized by the presence of a long gap in the final part of the Bellum Jugurthinum, from 103, 2 (quinque delegit) to 112, 3 (ratam), later filled by a reviser who had at his disposal a manuscript of the class of the integri; both derive, nevertheless, from a common archetype. Discrepancies are due in most cases to insertions of lessons and corrections from different sources: numerous are the glosses added to the original text. Notable among the mutili are Codex Parisinus 16024 and its descendants (Bibliothèque nationale de France, 9th century) and the 11th-century Basileensis. The integri are greater in number but are also more recent; among them are the Leidensis, Vossianus Latinus, Lipsiensis, Monacensis (11th century), and Palatinus (13th century). The most important printed edition is the Editio princeps published in Venice in 1470; among modern editions the one by A. W. Ahlberg, Gothenburg, 1911-15 and by A. Ernout, Paris 1946.)

It is more varied in structure and content than Sallust’s earlier work, De Catilinae Coniuratione. While the latter focuses on a brief conspiracy lasting approximately a year and a half (63–62 BCE) with events concentrated in Rome and Etruria, the Bellum Jugurthinum regards events both in Rome and North Africa, covering a conflict lasting seven years (111–105 BCE). The work includes Roman figures such as Scipio, Metellus, Scaurus, Bestia, Marius, and Sulla, and Numidian leaders like Micipsa, Adherbal, Jugurtha, and Bocchus. The history contains narrative elements, including the moral complexities of the central figures and their changing motivations throughout the course of the conflict.

Although extended to 114 chapters, Bellum Jugurthinum uses the same narrative techniques as Bellum Catilinae, following conventions of Hellenistic historical writing. Following the preface, Sallust presents a character portrait of the protagonist and outlines historical antecedents ("archaeology") that connect the narrative to Rome’s broader past. The main events are then recounted, punctuated by digressions and inserted speeches that provide reflective pauses and serve as vehicles for speeches and historical commentary.

Structure of the Bellum Jugurthinum
Chapter(s)	Contents	Topics covered
1–4	Preface	Incipit: the body, the soul, the virtus.
5	Introduction	Rationale for the choice of topic.
6–16	Background of the story	Events between 120 and 117 BCE and portrait of the protagonist.
17–19	1st excursus	Geographical and historical description of Numidia.
20–40	Beginning of the war	Events between 116 and 110 BCE.
41–42	2nd excursus	Age of the Gracchi.
43–77	Unfolding of the war	Events between 109 and 108 BCE.
78–79	3rd excursus	Further geographical discussion.
80–114	Conclusion of the war	Events between 107 and 104 BCE.

=== Historical background ===
Historical background

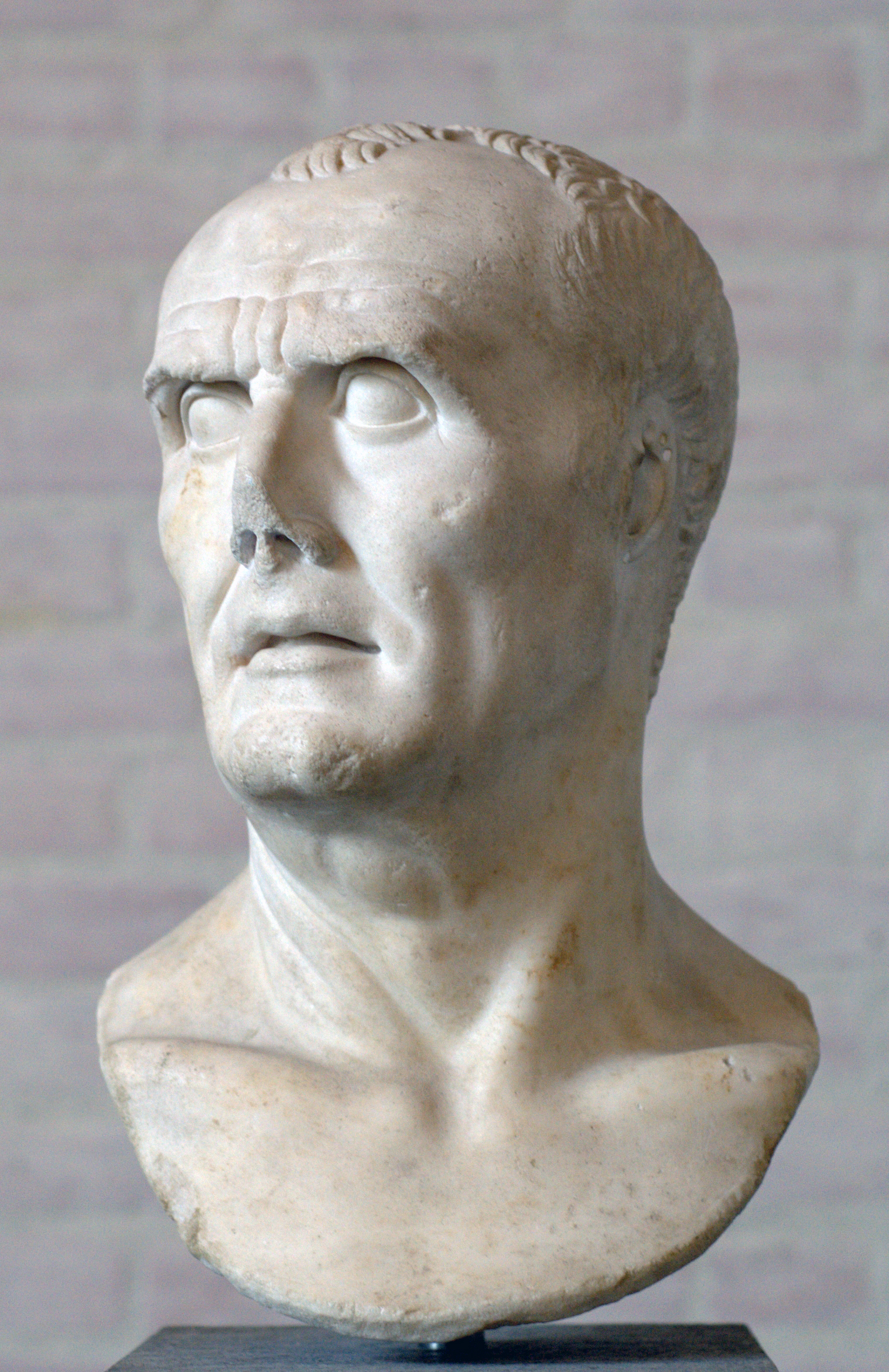

In 146 BC, Rome became the "ruler" of the Mediterranean and most of the territories bordering it. Publius Cornelius Scipio Aemilianus carried out the siege of Carthage and defeated Rome's rival Carthage, while to the east the armies of Rome destroyed the city of Corinth and sanctioned Roman dominance over Greece and the Balkan Peninsula. For Rome, a new historical phase was opening, which—through a century of crisis—would lead to the fall of the Republic and the birth of the Empire. At the political level, there was to be pacification in Hispania, where the Celtiberians and Lusitanians had long been in revolt. On the social level, however, a major crisis was sweeping the Italic economy: local crafts were being supplanted by products from the East, and small landowners, who formed the recruiting base for the armies, had found their fields destroyed after years of neglect. Only the exploitation of the provinces guaranteed the subsistence of the state while ensuring significant opportunities for enrichment for the equestrian class (equites). In this context the policy of Tiberius and Gaius Gracchus took shape: opposed to them and to the factio of the populares was that of the optimates, eager to maintain their privileges by becoming increasingly disinterested in the real conditions of the res publica.

The subject of Sallust’s second monograph is the protracted war fought by Rome in North Africa between 111 and 105 BCE against Jugurtha, king of Numidia. The conflict, which concluded with a Roman victory, took place approximately seventy years before the work’s publication. Unlike other military campaigns driven by the greed (avaritia) of the nobilitas, (Note: On the contrary, the protraction of the war, like the crisis situation of the state as it unfolded in the first century BCE, would both have been caused by greed on the part of the senatorial class.) Sallust presents this war as one in which the Roman Senate had little direct interest. The Senate favored a policy of non-intervention in Africa, (Note: The alliance with Numidia became, in fact, the real key to Rome's African policy: the presence of a friendly king allowed Rome to avoid direct military intervention, but, at the same time, also to contain any new Carthaginian expansionism.) seeing limited strategic or economic gain, and was concerned about leaving the northern frontier exposed—a vulnerability that would soon be exploited by the Cimbri and Teutons during their incursion into Italy, ultimately repelled by Gaius Marius. (Note: After repeatedly defeating Roman consular armies, the Cimbri and Teutons decided to invade Italy in 102 BC. The consul Gaius Marius was sent to counter them, defeating the Teutons at Aquae Sextiae, and the following year routing the numerically superior forces of the Cimbri at the Campi Raudii, near Vercelli.)

The groups most invested in the African campaign were the equites (knights), who supported expanding Rome’s commercial influence in the Mediterranean Basin. Among them were wealthy mercatores (merchants) from Italy, including the negotiators killed by Jugurtha in 112 BCE, who derived significant income from provincial trade and stood to benefit from strengthened Roman control in Africa. Additionally, segments of the Roman and Italic plebs viewed the conflict as an opportunity to gain land, recalling the precedent set by Gaius Gracchus a decade earlier with the establishment of the first overseas Roman colony on the site of Carthage, known as Colonia Junonia. (Note: The territories of the colonies were inhabited by Roman citizens, often members of the city plebs, or by soldiers on leave.)

== Summary ==
=== Chapters 1–4 (prelude) ===
Falso queritur de natura sua genus humanum, quod imbecilla atque aevi brevis forte potius quam virtute regatur. Nam contra reputando neque maius aliud neque praestabilius invenias magisque naturae industriam hominum quam vim aut tempus deesse. Sed dux atque imperator vitae mortalium animus est. Qui ubi ad gloriam virtutis via grassatur, abunde pollens potensque et clarus est neque fortuna eget, quippe quae probitatem, industriam aliasque artis bonas neque dare neque eripere cuiquam potest.
Mankind wrongly complains that its nature, weak and short-lived, is governed by chance rather than virtue. In fact, upon closer inspection, it will be found on the contrary that there is nothing greater and nobler, and that human nature lacks the will to act more than strength or time. But it is the spirit that guides and dominates men's lives. When it tends to glory through the path of virtue, it possesses vigor, strength and fame in abundance and has no need of fortune, for it cannot infuse honesty, tenacity and other moral qualities in anyone, nor wrest them from those who possess them.

— Sallust, Bellum Jugurthinum, 1, 1–3

The Bellum Jugurthinum opens with a proem that previews Sallust's ideas regarding human nature: the human being consists of body and soul, but only the solid possession of its virtue is to make a guarantee of eternal glory.

The prelude takes on particular relevance in the context of the crisis of the rēs pūblica, when it has a precise attachment to virtus which seems to be the only path capable of restoring peace and stability.

"Verum ex iis magistratus et imperia, postremo omnis cura rerum publicarum minime mihi hac tempestate cupienda videntur, quoniam neque virtuti honor datur neque illi, quibus per fraudem iis fuit uti, tuti aut eo magis honesti sunt."
"Among these, however, magistratures and military commands, in short, any public office, do not seem at all desirable in this period, because honor is not given on merit, and even those who have obtained it through intrigue are not more secure or honored for it."

— Sallust, Bellum Jugurthinum, 3, 1

Sallust openly criticizes the Roman political system, claiming it allows the undeserving to attain power. (Note: Exemplary is the case of Marcus Porcius Cato Uticensis, who, on the other hand, although deserving election to the consulship, could never obtain it, despite being even then a symbol of total morality and honesty (De Catilinae coniuratione, 54): the political system thus rejects those who fully exercise virtus.) He further defends the importance of the role of the historian against charges of it being considered a leisurely activity (otium), which he also does in De coniuratione Catilinae. (Note: The praise of historiographic activity constitutes a real topos in historical proems: Polybius (1:1-2) argues that historians have always used praise, saying that the teaching of history is the best education and exercise for political activities.)

=== Chapters 5–16 ===
"Bellum scripturus sum, quod populus Romanus (Note: The opening sentence of the fifth chapter is a hexameter: according to E. Skard (Ennius und Sallustius: eine sprachliche Untersuchung, Oslo, 1933, p. 63), this would be a quotation from Book VI of the Annales of Quintus Ennius. Although the use of verse in prose writing was considered a thing to be avoided, the use of hexameters (reminiscent of epic poetry) in the incipits of works on historical subjects was nevertheless widespread.) cum Iugurtha rege Numidarum gessit, primum quia magnum et atrox variaque victoria fuit, dein quia tunc primum superbiae nobilitatis obviam itum est."
"I am going to recount the war that the Roman people fought with Jugurtha, king of the Numids, first because it was long, bitter and with ups and downs, then because for the first time the arrogance of the nobles was countered. (Note: After the political failures of Tiberius and Gaius Gracchus, the senatorial nobilitas had held power uninterruptedly until the period of the Jugurthine War and the rise of Gaius Marius.")

— Sallust, Bellum Jugurthinum, 5, 1

After introducing the factual historical narrative, Sallust recounts the history of the kingdom of Numidia so that the whole of the events may be clearer. During the Second Punic War, the Numidian king Masinissa helped Publius Cornelius Scipio against the Carthaginian Hannibal. After the Battle of Zama and subsequent treaties, Rome decided to reward him by granting him sovereignty over many of the lands wrested from the Carthaginians, thus creating a strong, friendly relationship with Numidia. Upon Masinissa's death, his three sons, Gulussa, Mastanabal and Micipsa, inherited the kingdom, but Micipsa became the sole ruler of Numidia due to the untimely deaths of his brothers. In turn, Micipsa left the kingdom to his sons, Adherbal and Hiempsal, and his nephew Jugurtha, son of Mastanabal and a concubine.

The narrative then shifts to the character of Jugurtha, of whom Sallust provides a psychological description, and then to that of Micipsa; the latter, old and now close to death, is led as much to exalt Jugurtha as to suspect his good faith. For this reason, in 133 BCE, he sends him to Publius Cornelius Scipio Aemilianus, engaged in the siege of Numantia, in the hope that the young man will die in the war. Jugurtha, however, survives and distinguishes himself for his bravery, so much so that he wins numerous personal praises. (Note: Scipio, in a letter to Micipsa, comments as follows: In the war of Numantia your Jugurtha showed truly extraordinary valor, and I am sure you will be pleased by this. He is dear to me because of his merits: I shall do all I can to ensure that he is also beloved by the Roman senate and people. I congratulate you on our friendship. You have a man worthy of you and your ancestor Masinissa. — Sallust, Bellum Jugurthinum, 9, 2) A few years later (Note: In fact fifteen years elapse between the return of Jugurtha from Numantia and the death of Micipsa, but Sallust does not seem to be interested in the accuracy of the historical record.) Micipsa, on his deathbed, summons his sons along with Jugurtha and designates all three as his heirs, advising them to rule in harmony.

The three heirs immediately disregarded the recommendations they had received and divided the state treasury and areas of influence among themselves. In particular, sharp disagreements arose between Jugurtha and Hiempsal. The latter, of a very prideful nature, attempted to put his cousin in the background. However, Jugurtha, in response, had him killed.

The repercussions of killing Hiempsal were very serious for Jugurtha. Most of the terrified Numids rallied around Adherbal, who was forced to send ambassadors to Rome and clashed with Jugurtha in the field. From the battle, Adherbal is defeated, and he is forced to flee to Rome, where he hopes to receive the support of the senate. Meanwhile, Jugurtha also sends gold and silver to Rome to make gifts of it to the senators and thus draw them to his side. After arriving in Rome, Adherbal is able to deliver a long speech in the Senate. To sensitize the audience, he tries to leverage the relationship of friendship and fides that binds Rome to the Numidian dynasty, (Note: In fact, the appellation of amicus, which had been granted to Masinissa, was not a hereditary title, and was to be considered, indeed, linked to the person receiving it (G. M. Paul, A Historical Commentary on Sallust's Bellum Iugurthinum, Liverpool 1985, p. 56). The Senate however, with a view to a policy of non-intervention in Africa, benefited greatly from friendship with Numidia.) emphasizes the villainy of Jugurtha's actions, and portrays himself as unhappy and hapless. (Note: Thus referring to a literary topos originated in Euripides' Medea (vv. 502 ff.).) (Note: In Adherbal's oration, Sallust emphasizes those fundamental characteristics that the nobilitas, due to its own greed, lost, causing the relentless crisis of the republic.) The senators, bribed by the sums of money they received from Jugurtha's ambassadors, decide to favor the usurper. The Senate sends a token commission to Numidia, headed by Lucius Opimius, which assigns the area bordering the Roman province of Africa to Adherbal and the more fertile area bordering Mauretania to Jugurtha. (Note: Sallust insinuates that the allocation of the most fertile and richest area of Numidia to Jugurtha was the result of the corruption of Lucius Opimius; more likely, the senators wanted to secure the presence of the more loyal and less powerful Adherbal on the border with the province of Africa.)

=== Chapters 17–19 ===
"Res postulare videtur Africae situm paucis exponere et eas gentis, quibuscum nobis bellum aut amicitia fuit, attingere."
"The topic seems to require a brief description of Africa's position and a few words about those peoples with whom we have had relations of war or peace."

— Sallust, Bellum Jugurthinum, 17, 1

Sallust interrupts the narrative to include in the work a brief ethnographic digression on northern Africa, which he considers a continent separate from Europe and Asia. (Note: Africa was generally little known: indeed, even Sallust states that he did not want to talk about those peoples living in regions with a torrid climate, and consequently little known. There coexisted, then, numerous theses about the geographical nature of Africa itself: Herodotus (Histories, 2, 16, 1; 4, 42, 1) and Timaeus (in Polybius, 12, 15, 7) considered it a continent in its own right. In contrast, according to Varro (De lingua latina libri XXV, 5, 5, 31), Horace (Carmina, 3, 27, 75) and Pliny the Elder (Naturalis Historia, 3, 5), only Europe and Asia existed. Finally, Lucan (Pharsalia, 9, 411-413) placed it in Europe, Silius Italicus (1, 195) in Asia.) After briefly mentioning the characteristics of the territory and the men who inhabit it, he begins the actual history of humans in Africa, relying on the information handed down from the Libri Punici of Hiempsal. (Note: Sallust may have read the Libri Punici during his stay in Africa or, more likely, found them as a reference for African ethnography in some other work. It is unclear whether the books were written by Hiempsal (Punic was the learned language used in Numidia) or whether, more simply, they belonged to him. According to some, in fact, it would be a Greek work on the African peoples that Sallust, to lend greater authority to the narrative, describes as a local work. (R. Oniga, Sallust and Ethnography, Pisa 1995 pp. 51 ff.)) He then narrates the history of the nomadic and primitive tribes of the Libyans and the Gaetuli, the first inhabitants of Africa, later supplanted by the Medes, Persians and Armenians. The digression continues with a brief mention of the Phoenician breakthrough and Carthaginian rule and closes with a description of the situation at the time of the events narrated: the Romans have control over the Carthaginian cities, Jugurtha over most of the Numids and Gaetuli, and Bocchus I, father-in-law of Jugurtha himself, over the Mauri.

=== Chapters 20–40 ===
"Postquam diviso regno legati Africa decessere et Iugurtha contra timorem animi praemia sceleris adeptum sese videt, certum esse ratus, quod ex amicis apud Numantiam acceperat, omnia Romae venalia esse, simul et illorum pollicitationibus accensus, quos paulo ante muneribus expleuerat, in regnum Adherbalis animum intendit."
"When the delegates left Africa after the reign’s partition, seeing himself awarded for his crime despite all fears, Jugurtha had the certainty that in Rome everything was for sale, as he had heard from his friends in Numantia, and inflamed at the same time by the promises of those whom he had showered with gifts shortly before he turned his sights to Adherbal's kingdom."

— Sallust, Bellum Jugurthinum, 20, 1

Encouraged by Rome's favorable intervention, Jugurtha, in 113 BCE, resumed hostilities against Adherbal, who was determined to seize his kingdom to unify Numidia. The armies of the two clashed near Cirta, (Note: The geographical indication is approximate: Sallust speaks of a place not far from the sea (21, 2), while Cirta is about 70 km from the coast.) and victory again came to the forces of Jugurtha. Adherbal was forced to retreat within the walls of Cirta, where the Italian negotiatores (Note: These were merchants, financiers, landowners and shipowners. Sallust emphasizes the role they played in the story.) organized resistance to the siege. Having learned of the battle, the Roman Senate sent ambassadors to Numidia, but Jugurtha, appealing to the jus gentium, succeeded in thwarting their presence and prevented them from speaking to Adherbal. He then devoted himself to the careful organization of the siege, making use of all his strategic gifts. Adherbal, meanwhile, sent a request for help to the senate, which sent a new diplomatic mission to Numidia, led by Marcus Aemilius Scaurus. (Note: Scaurus was princeps senatus, and enjoyed, therefore, very great authority.) The elderly senator attempted to force Jugurtha to cease hostilities, but the Numidian refused to obey. Adherbal, then, urged on by the negotiatores themselves, decided to surrender the city provided he and all other inhabitants had their lives saved. Jugurtha accepted the offer, (Note: Diodorus Siculus (Bibliotheca historica, 34-35, 31) states that the city surrendered to Jugurtha out of hunger, and does not mention the role that the Italics played in convincing Adherbal to surrender.) but, upon seizing Cirta, he tortured and killed Adherbal, (Note: In the above passage, Diodorus Siculus relates that Adherbal came out of Cirta carrying an olive branch in his hand as a sign of peace. On reaching Jugurtha, he asked to have his life saved, but his cousin had his throat slit instantly.) and massacred all the adult citizens within the city.

=== Chapters 41–114 ===
Sallust describes the conditions of North Africa after the fall of Carthage and its senate. Sallust says that the Carthaginian Senate and people

== Characters ==
=== The Numidians ===
==== Adherbal ====
Adherbal was the eldest of Micipsa's sons and therefore is Hiempsal's brother and cousin of Jugurtha. After Hiempsal's death, Adherbal was left alone to counter Jugurtha's expansionist aims. He is repeatedly defeated in the field by his cousin Jugurtha, without displaying any particular tactical skills. Similarly, Sallust gives credit for the resistance of Cirta to the Italians, downplaying Adherbal's role there as well. He thus may appear naive and inexperienced when compared to his rival Jugurtha, who already had experience. Adherbal's address to the Roman Senate tries to receive Rome's help by appealing to some of the ideals – primarily that of fides (Note: At the political level, it was about the relationship of loyalty that was supposed to bind Rome and its allies.) and the mos maiorum. Sallust states that his words go unheeded precisely because of the corruption and greed of the nobilitas and the moral crisis of Rome. Similarly, Adherbal also points out how Jugurtha's acts constituted an offence against the Roman maiestas. (Note: Rome, as a superior power, could consider itself the real possessor of the kingdom of Numidia: any attack on it, therefore, had to be considered an attack on Rome and its majesty.) The senate nevertheless refused to intervene on his behalf, bribed by Jugurtha's gifts. Rather than being prone to plots and intrigue, Sallust portrays Adherbal to be a ruler dedicated to a policy of peaceful coexistence, which cannot subsist in the face of Jugurtha's duplicity and the corruption of the senate. (Note: Adherbal proves naively confident until the moment of his death, when Jugurtha has him killed after promising to let him live.)

==== Jugurtha ====
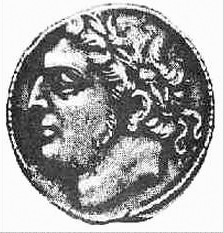
A coin depicting Jugurtha, the king of Numidia.

"Qui ubi primum adolevit, pollens viribus, decora facie, sed multo maxime ingenio validus, non se luxu neque inertiae corrumpendum dedit, sed, uti mos gentis illius est, equitare, iaculari; cursu cum aequalibus certare et, cum omnis gloria anteiret, omnibus tamen carus esse; ad hoc pleraque tempora in venando agere, leonem atque alias feras primus aut in primis ferire: plurimum facere, [et] minimum ipse de se loqui."
"When he became a teenager, strong and handsome in appearance, but above all of lively intelligence, he did not allow himself to be corrupted by luxury and idleness, but, according to the custom of his people, he rode, threw the javelin, and competed with his peers in running; and, while surpassing everyone in glory, he was nevertheless cherished by them all; moreover, he spent most of his time in hunting, was always the first or among the first to strike the lion and other beasts; (Note: Lion hunting constituted a kind of initiation rite for the young man of royal rank. (G. Cipriani, Giugurta e la caccia al leone. Una questione di etichetta, "Invigilata Lucernis" 10, 1988, pp. 75-90)) he was extremely active, and spoke very little about himself."

— Sallust, Bellum Jugurthinum, 6, 1

===== Differences between Catiline and Jugurtha and the causes of the corruption of the Roman nobility =====
The character of Catiline can be seen as a monstrum, since he assimilates in himself several characteristics, even completely opposite to each other, which make him enigmatic, similar to the Numidian Jugurtha. But while the character of Catiline in the course of the De coniuratione Catilinae all in all does not undergo substantial changes in his psychic character, and in fact he is born as a character with a corrupt and evil disposition and remains so until the end, the character of Jugurtha undergoes remarkable changes in character; in fact, he is born as a young boy, heir to the Numidian throne, with a wholesome soul and full of good principles, but in the course of the Bellum Jugurthinum he changes radically, "polluted" by the negative influence of the then deeply corrupt Roman nobilitas, which led his character to become pravus. Both characters are the fruit of the wickedness of the senatorial class, from which they came (Catiline) or were strongly conditioned (Jugurtha); this "internal rot" from a social and moral point of view has its roots in 146 BCE, the year of the destruction, by the Roman armies, of Carthage. In fact, the defeat of the Punic city put an end to the so-called metus hostilis (fear of the enemy), that is, the fear that the Romans had for the Carthaginian enemies and which drove them to remain united and smoothed out internal disputes; having lacked this powerful "glue," the feelings of ambitio and avaritia of the senatorial oligarchy were exacerbated and, above all, the hostilities present between the various factiones, resulting in the bloody civil wars of the first century BCE. Indeed, there is a shift from struggles between hostes (foreign enemies, barbarians) to struggles between adversarii (political rivals, factional strife), which unleashed unprecedented waves of internal violence and decreed the inevitable end of the whole set of institutions that constituted the Roman res publica.

==== Hiempsal ====
Hiempsal is the youngest of the sons of Micipsa, brother of Adherbal and cousin of Jugurtha. His role in the Bellum Jugurthinum is entirely secondary, although it is his behavior that provides the occasional cause for the beginning of hostilities between Jugurtha and Adherbal. For he, particularly prideful by nature, despises Jugurtha because he is the son of a concubine and tries in every way to humiliate him, even siding with the abolition of the measures taken by Micipsa after his nephew's association with the throne. He thus demonstrates that he lacks the political intelligence, in contrast to his father. He performs rash acts without foreseeing the consequences. Jugurtha, in fact, moved by wrath and fear, decides to have him killed and sends some of his men to the dwelling where he is: Hiempsal, attempting to defend himself, dies by cowardly taking refuge in the hut of a slave girl, and his head is brought to Jugurtha.

==== Micipsa ====
Micipsa is the eldest son of the Numidian king Masinissa, and he rises to power along with his brothers, Gulussa and Mastanabal, upon his father's death in 148 BCE. After the untimely death of his brothers, he finds himself reigning alone and provides valuable aid to the Romans during the Third Punic War. He has two sons, Adherbal and Hiempsal I, and is the uncle of Jugurtha. In his role as a "politician," he is naturally an example of the continuous mutability that characterizes many characters in the work.

In the Bellum Jugurthinum he appears already late in life, busy thinking about who is best suited to succeed him in the role of ruler. He rejoices in the prestige of Jugurtha, confident that the latter may be suitable to lead Numidia and bring it great glory, but he soon realizes that his nephew would be in a condition of clear superiority to his sons because of his age and popularity. He then finds himself frightened by the nature of Jugurtha, greedy and prone to satisfy his own desires. (Note: Sallust's omniscience, in this case, can be likened to that – to quote Todorov – of one who "sees through the walls of houses in the same way he reads in his hero's mind." It is not known how he does it, but he is able to get at the innermost intentions, the most secret projects, the most unexpected reactions of the characters. (G. Cipriani, Sallustio e l'immaginario. Per una biografia eroica di Giugurta, Bari 1988, p. 17)) The king of Numidia then demonstrates, in his attempt to eliminate his nephew, that he is a wise politician and as careful as ever about the consequences that his acts may have: he therefore avoids having him assassinated or having him fall victim to some intrigue. He prefers to tempt fate and send him to war with Numantia. His plan having failed, Micipsa finds himself forced to accept the now inevitable rise of his nephew, who becomes heir along with Adherbal and Hiempsal. (Note: Again, Sallust shows little concern for the accuracy of the historical fact: Micipsa's adoption of Jugurtha and his subsequent appointment as heir to the throne along with his cousins does not occur upon Jugurtha's own return from Numantia, but between 121 and 118 BCE.) Even at this juncture, he shows great political intelligence in being able to adapt to the different situations in which he finds himself, always avoiding creating situations of open conflict.

On his deathbed, he summons his sons and grandson to his side and, pretending to rejoice in the successes of Jugurtha, instructs his successors on how they should behave in leading the kingdom. He invites them to concord and mutual cooperation, giving them this advice:

"Non exercitus neque thesauri praesidia regni sunt, verum amici, quos neque armis cogere neque auro parare queas: officio et fide pariuntur. Quis autem amicior quam frater fratri? Aut quem alienum fidum invenies, si tuis hostis fueris? Equidem ego vobis regnum trado firmum, si boni eritis, sin mali, imbecillum. Nam concordia paruae res crescunt, discordia maximae dilabuntur."
"Neither army nor treasures are the defense of the kingdom, but friends, whom you cannot force with weapons nor buy with gold: they are won with respect and loyalty." (Note: According to Xenophon in the Cyropaedia (8, 7, 13), Cyrus, before dying, said: The preservation of a kingdom does not depend on this golden scepter: trusted friends are the most authentic scepter.) Who can ever be more friendly than a brother with his brother? Or what stranger will you find trustworthy, if you will be an enemy to your own? I give you a strong kingdom, if you will be righteous, a weak one, if you will be wicked. For in concord small states prosper, and in discord even the mightiest collapse. (Note: Seneca, in Letters to Lucilius (94, 46) states that Marcus Agrippa [...] owed much of his success to the following maxim: "Small states grow with concord; but even the largest ones go down with discord.")

— Sallust, Bellum Jugurthinum, 10, 4-6

Shortly thereafter, Jugurtha passed away, receiving all the funeral honors of a king.

== Analysis ==
=== Reliability and historicity of the work ===
Absent from the Bellum Jugurthinum are the elements of ethnographic description that are often associated with historiographical works. The geographical and historical digression of chapters 17-19 are viewed by some to be overly approximate, especially for a historian who held the position of governor of the province of Africa for many years: indeed, Sallust states that he draws on written sources rather than personal observation, and this makes his description come across as inaccurate. Similarly, the portrayal of Jugurtha also appears rather stereotyped and not the result of careful observation of the habits of the local people; some traits of youthful behavior and education are those typical of barbarians, and Sallust seems to draw on the Greek historiographical tradition, in particular Xenophon's Cyropaedia. The description, therefore, is in the overall reticent, vague and nebulous.

At the historical level, Sallust shows little attention to the exact order of the events narrated. Inaccuracies regarding chronological details are frequent, and equally frequent is the use of ellipses and expressions that fill long narrative spaces otherwise devoid of action.

== See also ==
- Numantia

== Bibliography ==
Texts

- Sallustio Crispo, Gaio; N. Flocchini; G. Ottaviani (1993). Antologia dalle opere. Torino, Italy: Paravia.
- Sallustio Crispo, Gaio; L. Canali (a cura di) (1994). La guerra giugurtina. Testo originale a fronte. Milano, Italy: Garzanti Libri.
- Gaio Sallustio Crispo; P. Frassinetti; L. Di Salvo (a cura di) (2002). Opere. Torino, Italy: UTET.
- Crispo, Gaio Sallustio; A. Crugnola (a cura di). Antologia sallustiana. Principato.

Critics

- L. Olivieri Sangiacomo (1954). Sallustio. Firenze: Le Monnier.
- Buechner, K. (1960). Sallust. Heidelberg, Germany: Carl Winter, Universitätsverlag.
- Syme, R. (1968). Sallustio. Paideia.
- Scanlon, T. F. (1980). The influence of Thucydides on Sallust. Heidelberg, Germany.
- Mevoli, D. (1994). La vocazione di Sallustio. Congedo.
- Crispo, Gaio Sallustio; Livio, Tito; Coco, L. (2003). L'uomo e la natura. Loffredo.

Other books

- Camera, Augusto; Renato Fabietti (1969). Elementi di storia antica, vol II – ROMA. Bologna, Italy: Zanichelli.
- Perelli, Luciano (1973). Antologia della letteratura latina. Torino, Italy: Paravia.
- Paletti, Lao (1974). Corso di lingua latina. I. Fonetica, Morfologia, Sintassi. Torino, Italy: Paravia.
- Luca Serianni; Alfredo Castelvecchi (1989). Grammatica italiana. Italiano comune e lingua letteraria. Torino, Italy: UTET libreria, Linguistica.
- Castiglioni, Luigi; Scevola Mariotti (con la collaborazione di Arturo Brambilla e Gaspare Campagna) (1990). IL – Vocabolario della lingua latina. Torino, Italy: Loescher.
- Griffa, Lodovico (1990). Latino – Teoria. Firenze, Italy: La Nuova Italia.
- Traina, Alfonso; Giorgio Bernardi Perini (1995). Propedeutica al latino universitario. Bologna, Italy: PATRON editore.
- Conte, Gian Biagio (2001). Letteratura latina. Firenze, Italy: Le Monnier.
- Campanini; Carboni (2003). NOMEN – Il nuovissimo Campanini Carboni. Latino Italiano – Italiano Latino. Torino, Italy: Paravia.
