= Origo gentis Romanae =

Literary work

Start of the Origo in the Brussels manuscript

The Origo gentis Romanae ("origin of the Roman people") is a short historiographic literary compilation. It narrates the origins of the Roman people, beginning with Saturn and concluding with Romulus. The work was earlier associated with Aurelius Victor, but it is no longer believed to be by his hand.

There are two manuscript copies of the Origo: MS 9755–63 in the Royal Library of Belgium in Brussels and MS Canon. Class. Lat. 131 in the Bodleian Library in Oxford. Both date to the fifteenth century.

== Bibliography ==
- Momigliano, Arnaldo (1958). "Some Observations on the 'Origo Gentis Romanae'". The Journal of Roman Studies. 48 (1): 56–73. doi:10.2307/298214.
- Smith, Christopher J. (2005). "The Origo Gentis Romanae: Facts and Fictions". Bulletin of the Institute of Classical Studies. 48: 97–136. JSTOR 43646722.
- Van Hoof, Lieve; Van Nuffelen, Peter (2020). The Fragmentary Latin Histories of Late Antiquity (AD 300–620): Edition, Translation and Commentary. Cambridge University Press.
