= Christopher Smith (classicist) =

British historian of ancient Rome (born 1965)

Christopher John Smith, FRSE, FSA, FRHistS (born 1965 at Aylesbury, Buckinghamshire), is a British academic and classicist specialising in early Ancient Rome.

Professor of Ancient History at the University of St Andrews, and formerly Director of the British School at Rome, Smith was appointed on 1 September 2020 as Executive Chair of the Arts and Humanities Research Council.

== Early life and education ==
Born in 1965 at Aylesbury, Buckinghamshire, Smith attended Aylesbury Grammar School before going up to Keble College, Oxford, to read Literae Humaniores, graduating as Bachelor of Arts in 1988. He then pursued further studies, taking a DPhil from Oxford in 1992.

== Academic career ==
After joining the University of St Andrews in 1992 as a Lecturer in Ancient History, Smith was appointed to a professorial chair in 2002.

Elected FSA (Scot), he served as Proctor & Provost of St Leonard's College at St Andrews, before becoming President of the Unione Internazionale degli Istituti di Archeologia Storia e Storia dell'Arte in Rome from 2012 to 2017.

In 2017 Smith was awarded a three-year Leverhulme Trust Major Research Grant to study Rome's early kings, and is a foreign member to the Istituto Nazionale di Studi Etruschi ed Italici in Florence.

His research explores constitutionalism and state formation with particular emphasis on the development of Rome as a political and social community and how this was represented in ancient historical writing and subsequent political thought.

== Selected publications and awards ==
Among Smith's publications are:

- Early Rome and Latium: Economy and Society c. 1000 to 500 BC Oxford : Clarendon Press; New York : Oxford University Press, 1996. ISBN 978-0-19-815031-2.
- The Roman Clan: The Gens from Ancient Ideology to Modern Anthropology.Cambridge; New York : Cambridge University Press, 2006. ISBN 978-0-521-85692-8.
- Christopher John Smith; Anton Powell; Tim Cornell, eds. The lost memoirs of Augustus and the development of Roman autobiography. Swansea [Wales]: Classical Press of Wales; Oakville, CT: Distributor in the United States of America, David Brown Book Co., 2009. ISBN 978-1-905125-25-8.
- CJ Smith, RJ Covino (eds). Praise and Blame in Roman Republican Oratory. Swansea : Classical Press of Wales; Oakville, CT : Distributor in the United States of America, David Brown Book Co., 2011. ISBN 978-1-905125-46-3.
- Peter Derow; Christopher John Smith; Liv Mariah Yarrow, eds. Imperialism, Cultural Politics, and Polybius. Oxford; New York : Oxford University Press, 2012. ISBN 978-0-19-960075-5.

=== Fellowships ===
- FSA
- FRHistS
- FSA (Scot)
- FRSE
- Awarded Premio Cultori di Roma 2017 by the Istituto Nazionale di Studi Romani.
