= Cyril E. Robinson =

British writer and teacher (1884–1981)

Cyril Edward Robinson (1884–1981) was an English historian, writer and teacher at Winchester College in Hampshire. He is the author of a number of works on ancient Greece and Rome.

== Life ==
Robinson was born in Bury St. Edmunds, UK, in 1884. The son of a clergyman, he excelled in his studies at both Marlborough college and Magdalen college, Oxford, earning distinctions at both. In 1909 he became a teacher at Winchester College, Hampshire, UK, where he remained until his retirement in 1945.

== Works ==
- Cyril Edward Robinson (1917), The Days of Alkibiades, E. Arnold.
- Cyril E. Robinson (1929), A History of Greece, Methuen.
- Cyril E. Robinson (1930), England, a History of British Progress from the Early Ages to the Present Day, Thomas Y. Crowell.
- Cyril Edward Robinson, P.G.Hunter (1938), Roma, Cambridge University Press.
- Robinson, CE (1940), Latinum: A Reader for the First Stage of Latin , Cambridge University Press.
- Cyril E. Robinson (1941), A History of Rome from 753 B.C. to A.D. 410, Methuen.
- C.E.Robinson (1946), Zito Hellas: A Popular History of Ancient Greece, Chapman & Hall.
- Cyril E. Robinson (1948), Hellas: A Short History of Ancient Greece, Pantheon Books.
- Cyril E. Robinson (1952), A History of the Roman republic, Methuen.
- Cyril E. Robinson (1965), History of Rome, Thomas Y Crowell.
- Cyril E. Robinson (1978), Everyday Life in Ancient Greece, Praeger.
- C.E. (Cyril Edward) Robinson (2012), A History of England, Early and Middle Ages to 1485, HardPress Publishing.
