= Historicorum Romanorum reliquiae =

Collection of scholarly editions of fragmentary Roman historical texts

The Historicorum Romanorum reliquiae is the "monumental" two-volume collection of scholarly editions of fragmentary Roman historical texts edited by Hermann Peter and published between 1870 and 1914. Peter published the Latin editions of these texts, without translation and with introductions in Latin; for the greatest part of the twentieth century, this was the standard edition of such texts. Peter considers the reign of Constantine the Great as marking the end of Roman historiography (with the exception of a sixth-century excerpt preserved in Jordanes); history after, he said, "went over to the Christians and the Greeks".

The first volume appeared in Leipzig in 1870, with a second edition (revised by Peter himself) appearing in Leipzig in 1914 (and reprinted Stuttgart, 1967); the second volume appeared in Leipzig in 1906. In 1993, a reprinted edition with additional bibliography appeared. In the middle of the twentieth century there were repeated calls (including by Felix Jacoby, editor of a similar collection of Greek fragments, Fragmente der griechischen Historiker) for an updated, revised edition of the fragments, aided by a sea change in the field of historiography and a critique of Peter's outdated perspective. The collection was supplanted by Martine Chassignet's L'Annalistique romaine, the third and final volume of which was published in 2004. Other editors who have taken up the project of publishing the important fragments of Roman literary tradition include Courtney (Fragmentary Latin Poets) and Malcovati (Oratorum Romanorum Fragmenta).

Hermann Peter was also an editor of the Augustan History and an editor of and expert on the Origo gentis romanae. His monograph on Roman epistle writing, Der Brief in der römischen Litteratur (Leipzig, 1901), is considered a classic in the field.
