= Origines =

History book written by Cato the Censor

Origines ([ɔˈriːɡɪneːs], "Origins") is the title of a lost work on Roman and Italian history by Cato the Elder, composed in the early-2nd century BC.

== Contents ==
According to Cato's biographer Cornelius Nepos, the Origins consisted of seven books. Book I was the history of the founding and kings of Rome. Books II and III covered the origins of major Italian cities and gave the work its title. The last four books dealt with the Roman Republic, its wars, and its growing power, focused on the period between the onset of the First Punic War up to 149 BC.

When Cato wrote, there had been four major works devoted to Roman history: Naevius and Ennius had written in Latin verse and Fabius Pictor and Alimentus had written in Greek prose. The two poetic works closely tied the history of Rome to its gods. The two prose works apparently hewed closely to the annals of the pontifex maximus. Feeling no need to follow precedent, Roman or otherwise, Cato declared:

I do not care to copy out what is on the High Priest's tablet: how many times grain became dear, how many times the sun or moon were obscured or eclipsed.

In his books on the Italian cities, Cato apparently treated each individually and drew upon their own local traditions.

The latter books include at least two of Cato's political orations verbatim, something thought to have been unique in ancient historiography. The first was his oration to the Roman Senate against declaring war on Rhodes in 167 BC. The other was his oration to the Senate supporting legislation to establish a special court of inquiry regarding Sulpicius Galba's treatment of the Lusitani. Although he avoided mentioning military commanders by name, the work's surviving fragments suggest that he also focused a great deal of attention on his own campaigns as a general.

== History ==
The Origins is a lost work, with no complete text surviving to the modern day. Its fragments in other works have been collected and translated.

== Influence ==
Ancient authors considered the Origins to have influenced the style of Sallust. Quintilian cites an anonymous epigram that calls him the "great thief of the words of old Cato". Festus felt that the last four books on Rome's rising power "outweighed the rest", but later Roman historians largely disregarded the Origins because it eschewed consular dating and highlighted his own political career so heavily. Though Livy pointedly remarked that Cato was "not the man to minimize his own achievements", his near contemporary Dionysius of Halicarnassus cites Cato's first three books in his history, calling Cato among the "most learned of the Roman historians".

In the present day, the Origins is considered to be the beginning of proper historiography in Latin and considered to have been an important work in the development of Latin literature.
