= Legibus =

Legibus, dative and ablative plural for Latin lex (law), may refer to:

Literature

- De Legibus a dialogue written by Marcus Tullius Cicero
- De Legibus et Consuetudinibus Angliae, work by Henry de Bracton
- De legibus naturae, work by Richard Cumberland (philosopher)
- Tractatus of Glanvill (Tractatus de legibus et consuetudinibus regni Angliae)

Laws

- Decemviri (also Decemviri Legibus Scribundis Consulari Imperio)

Phrases

- Legibus solutus (sometimes princeps legibus solutus est); see above the law (disambiguation)

== See also ==
- Lex (disambiguation)
- Leges (disambiguation)
