= Leges =

Leges (plural of Latin lex: law) may refer to:

== Literature ==
- Laws (dialogue) Plato's last and longest dialogue

== Ancient Roman law ==
- Leges regiae, early Roman laws introduced by the Kings of Rome
- Lex Julia (Leges Juliae), ancient Roman laws, introduced by any member of the Julian family
- Leges Clodiae, series of laws passed by the Plebeian Council of the Roman Republic
- Leges provinciae, 146 BC laws concerning the regulation and administration of Roman provinces
- Lex Antonia (Leges Antoniae), law established in ancient Rome in 44 BC
- Lex Licinia Sextia (Leges Liciniae Sextiae), Roman law which restored the consulship in 367 BCE

== Laws in other governments ==
- Leges Henrici Primi, legal treatise, written circa 1115, on legal customs of medieval England
- Leges palatinae, laws governing the functioning of the royal court of the Kingdom of Majorca
- Leges Edwardi Confessoris, early twelfth-century English collection of 39 laws
- Leges Genuciae, laws proposed in 342 BCE by plebeian consul Lucius Genucius
- Leges barbarorum; see Early Germanic law
- Sacrae Disciplinae Leges, 1983 apostolic constitution by Pope John Paul II
- Leges inter Brettos et Scottos, legal codification under David I of Scotland
- Welsh law (Leges Walliae)
- Edictum Rothari (Leges Langobardorum) 643 CE compilation of Lombard law

== Phrases ==
- Inter arma enim silent leges ("In times of war, the law falls silent"), phrase attributed to Cicero
- Inter Arma Enim Silent Leges (Star Trek: Deep Space Nine), an episode of the series
- Leges sine Moribus vanae, motto of University of Pennsylvania

== Other uses ==
- Leges (diocese), a Roman Catholic titular bishopric in modern Algeria; see Numidia#Episcopal sees

== See also ==
- Lex (disambiguation)
- Legibus (disambiguation)
