= Sicilia (Roman province) =

Roman province

Sicilia Σικελία
- Province of the Roman Empire
- 241 BC–468 AD
- The province of Sicilia within the Roman Empire, c. 125 AD
- Capital: Syracusae
- Historical era: Antiquity
  - Established after the end of First Punic War: 241 BC
  - Vandal conquest: 468 AD
Preceded by	Succeeded by
Ancient Carthage; Kingdom of Syracuse	Theme of Sicily
- Today part of: Italy; Malta

Sicilia (/sɪˈsɪliə/; Classical Latin: [sɪˈkɪ.li.a]; Ancient Greek: Σικελία, romanized: Sikelía) was the first province acquired by the Roman Republic, encompassing the island of Sicily. The western part of the island was brought under Roman control in 241 BC at the conclusion of the First Punic War with Carthage. A praetor was regularly assigned to the island from c. 227 BC. The Kingdom of Syracuse under Hieron II remained an independent ally of Rome until its defeat in 212 BC during the Second Punic War. Thereafter the province included the whole of the island of Sicily, the island of Malta, and the smaller island groups (the Egadi islands, the Lipari islands, Ustica, and Pantelleria).

During the Roman Republic, the island was the main source of grain for the city of Rome. Extraction was heavy, provoking armed uprisings known as the First and Second Servile Wars in the second century BC. In the first century, the Roman governor, Verres, was famously prosecuted for his corruption by Cicero. In the civil wars which brought the Roman Republic to an end, Sicily was controlled by Sextus Pompey in opposition to the Second Triumvirate. When the island finally came under the control of Augustus in 36 BC, it was substantially reorganised, with large Roman colonies being established in several major cities.

For most of the Imperial period, the province was a peaceful, agrarian territory. As a result, it is rarely mentioned in literary sources, but archaeology and epigraphy reveals several thriving cities, such as Lilybaeum and Panormus in the west, and Syracuse and Catania in the east. These communities were organised in a similar way to other cities of the Roman Empire and were largely self-governing. Greek and Latin were the main languages of the island but Punic, Hebrew and probably other languages were also spoken. There were several Jewish communities on the island and from around AD 200 there is also evidence of substantial Christian communities.

The province briefly fell under the control of the Vandal kingdom of North Africa in 468 shortly before the fall of the Western Roman Empire, but was soon returned to the Kingdom of Italy and returned to Roman control under the eastern emperor at Constantinople to which it would remain until the 9th century.

== History ==
=== First Punic War ===
Sicily during the first Punic War between Rome and Carthage (264–241 BC)

Agathocles, tyrant of Syracuse from 317 and King of Sicily from 307 or 304 BC, died in 289 BC. A group of his Campanian mercenaries, called the Mamertines, were offered compensation in exchange for leaving the city. They took control of Messina, killing and exiling the men, and holding the women in bondage.

In response to this, the Syracusan general Hiero, who had reorganised the mercenaries and was able to bring banditry under control in 269 BC, began advancing on Messina. The Carthaginians, always eager to prevent the excessive empowerment of a single force and to keep Sicily divided, offered aid to the Mamertines. Hiero had to return to Syracuse, where he assumed the title of king. Shortly thereafter, the Mamertines decided to expel the Carthaginian garrison and seek aid from the Romans instead.

At Rome, there was a debate on the appropriateness of helping the Mamertines. Previously, Rome had intervened against Campanian mercenaries who had followed the Mamertines' example and taken control of Rhegium (modern Reggio Calabria). Moreover, it seemed clear that intervention in Sicily would lead to conflict with Carthage. According to the lost historian Philinus of Agrigentum, who was favourable to the Carthaginians, there was a treaty between Rome and Carthage which defined their respective spheres of influence and assigned Sicily to the Carthaginians. This "Philinus Treaty" is known to us from Polybius, who mentions it in order to deny its existence. Polybius also claims that the Romans were encouraged to intervene by economic motivations, on account of the wealth of Sicily in this period. The Senate gave the decision on whether or not to help the Mamertines to the popular assembly, which decided to send help. This was not a formal declaration of war against Carthage, but the intervention in Sicily sufficed as a casus belli and thus marked the beginning of the First Punic War (264–241 BC).

This was the first time that Roman forces had campaigned outside the Italian peninsula. Hiero, allied with Carthage against the Mamertines, had to face the legions of Valerius Messalla. The Romans quickly expelled the Syracusans and Carthaginains from Messina. In 263 BC, Hiero changed sides, making a peace treaty with the Romans in exchange for an indemnity of 100 talents, thus ensuring the maintenance of his power. He proved a loyal ally of the Romans until his death in 215 BC, providing aid, specially grain and siege weapons, to the Romans. This assistance was essential for the conquest of the Carthaginian base at Agrigentum in 262 BC. Hiero's loyalty is reflected in the peace treaty imposed on the Carthaginians at the end of the war, in which they were forbidden to attack Hiero or his allies. It seems, however, that pro-Roman sentiment was not universal at Syracuse and that there was a group opposed to Hiero which favoured the Carthaginians.

At the end of the First Punic War, Rome had conquered the majority of the island, except for Syracuse, which retained a broad autonomy (although required to accept Roman suzerainty in the region). In addition to Syracuse, the kingdom of Hiero was granted a number of centres in the eastern part of the island, such as Akrai, Leontini, Megara, Eloro, Netum and Tauromenium, and probably also Morgantina and Camarina.

In addition to the aforementioned Philinus, there were other accounts of the First Punic War written by authors opposed to Rome, such as Sosilus of Sparta. The work of Philinus was analysed and criticised by Polybius, while that of Sosilus was entirely rejected by him as the "vulgar gossip of a barber's shop." A pro-Roman account was written by the historian Fabius Pictor, which is criticised by Polybius as well. The resulting representation of the war in the ancient source material is very partial: the motivations of the Mamertines are left opaque and by the time of Polybius (about a hundred years after the war began) there were different opinions even at Rome. The ancient accounts' impression that a war between Carthage and Rome was inevitable also seems questionable. Even the traditional explanation that Carthage was threatening Rome at the Straits of Messina seems anachronistic according to Moses Finley, since Carthage had never shown any inclination to expand into Italy. Probably no one at Rome foresaw that intervention at Messina would lead to a conflict on such a scale. According to the account of Polybius, this changed only after the conquest of Agrigentum. Finley says "this argument appears too simple and schematic, but it is correct in the sense that only then did Rome take the essential decision of creating a fleet, without which there was no hope of fighting the Carthaginians on equal terms.". The reaction of the Carthaginians to Roman intervention, however, is easily explained: Sicily had always been fundamental for Carthaginian control of the seas.

In any case, the fact that the Romans ultimately conquered the island makes it difficult to produce a balance reconstruction of conditions on Sicily in this period. What is certain is that the First Punic War had a disastrous effect on the territory. Both Rome and Carthage carried out atrocities: 250,000 inhabitants of Agrigentum (Philinus' homeland) were sold as slaves in 262 BC and seven years later the Carthaginians demolished the walls of the same city and set it on fire. In 258 BC, the Roman conquest of Camarina saw the majority of the inhabitants sold into slavery and 27,000 inhabitant of Panormus suffered the same fate (although 14,000 were redeemed). In 250 BC, Selinus was razed to the ground by the Romans and it was not inhabited again until Late Antiquity. Lilybaeum resisted a Roman siege for ten years, until the conclusion of the war after the Battle of the Aegates.

=== The first Roman province ===
The Roman victory in the First Punic War placed the entire island of Sicily in Roman hands. Previous Roman conquests in Italy had resulted in direct annexation or asymmetric treaties with Rome as hegemonic power. These treaties guaranteed substantial internal autonomy to the socii: they were required to contribute troops when requested but not to pay any form of tribute. Probably because of the island's complex mixture of ethnicities and perhaps also in order to recoup the expenses sustained during the war through a system of fiscal control, which excluded the concession of broad autonomy, Sicily came to be defined by a different institutional system.

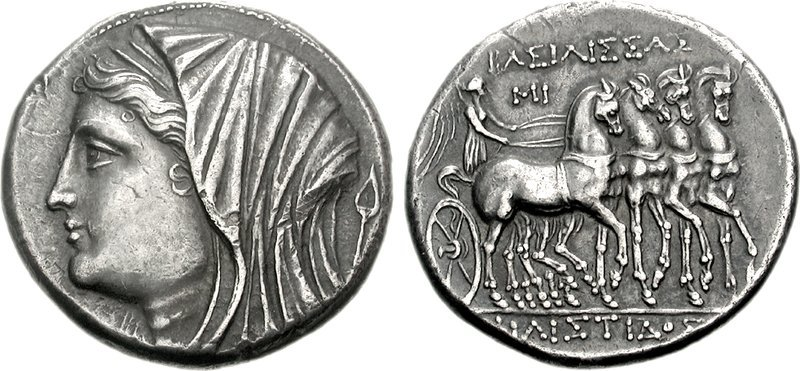
Philistis, wife of Hiero II, depicted on a tetradrachm minted between 218 and 214 BC

Eventually, the provincial structure would consist of a praetor, assisted in financial matters by two quaestores, one based at Lilybaeum and one based at Syracuse. But it is not clear how this system took form. It has been suggested that from 240 BC the government of western Sicily was entrusted to a quaestor sent annually to Lilybaeum. Scholars like Filippo Coarelli and Michael Crawford consider it possible that the government of Sicily was entrusted to a privatus cum imperio, that is an aristocrat with no official post and with a military command conferred on a personal basis, sent annually with administrative and judicial competence. Extraordinary governors of this kind were seen already during the First Punic War and occur again during the Second Punic War. Assuming that there was a quaestor at Lilybaeum, it is unclear whether this position was created immediately after the end of the war or sometime later, or if it was one of the quaestores which already existed, that is one of the quaestores classici (treasurers of the fleet), that had first been created in 267 BC, when the number of quaestores was increased from four to eight. Nor is it clear if there were two quaestores in the province from the beginning (one in Lilybaeum and one in Syracuse), since in all the provinces that were subsequently established, there was only one quaestor. According to Antonino Pinzone this difference is explained by the fact that Sicily "came under the control of Rome in two stages," so that "the position of the quaestor of Lilybaeum is to be considered a kind of fossil and his influence is to be imputed to the financial and military arrangements inherited from the quaestor (classicus?).".

Subsequently, in 227 BC, two new praetores were created (praetores provinciales): one, Gaius Flaminius, was sent to Sicily; the other, Marcus Valerius Laevinus, to the new province of Corsica and Sardinia. Originally, the term provincia indicated the jurisdiction of a magistrate (especially the possession of imperium); eventually it came to indicate the territory under their control. The change of 227 is reported by Gaius Julius Solinus:

The two islands under the control of Rome were made provinces in the same moment when in that year [227 BC] M. Valerius was assigned as praetor of Sardinia by lot and C. Flaminius of the other island.

— Collectanea rerum memorabilium, 5.1

It was in 227 BC that an annual grain tribute was imposed on the Sicilian communities by a lex frumentaria. This is best known for the province of Sicily from the 1st century BC context (as a result of Cicero's Verrines). At that time, the tribute consisted of a tenth of the harvest and it is possible that this system derived from the Syracusan kingdom (the lex Hieronica, derived in turn from the Ptolemaic grain tax). The tithe decuma was contracted out to the highest bidder (whoever promised to collect the largest amount of modii). These contractors were called decumani. It seems that this lex frumentaria had results which were "not excessively grievous for the cities to pay ... and the small Italians proprietors livin on the island. It developed in the context of Gaius Flaminius' focus on the development of small proprietors and of their class.".

=== Second Punic War ===
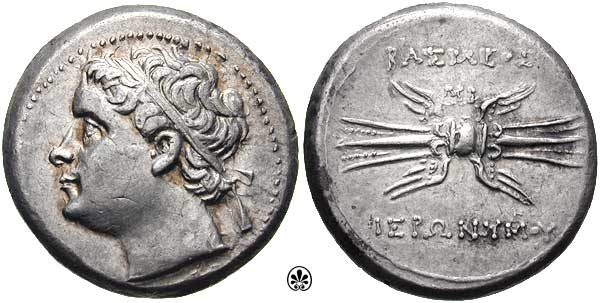
Hieronymus, King of Syracuse (215 BC), depicted on one of his coins.

The Second Punic War (218-201 BC) was initiated by Hannibal who was aware of the importance of the Italian socii to Rome and accordingly decided to attack the Romans on their own turf, passing through Gaul, over the Alps and into Italy. In a particularly difficult moment for Rome after the defeat at the Battle of Cannae (216 BC), Hiero II died (215 BC). His successor Hieronymus, his fifteen-year-old grandson, decided to switch to the Carthaginian side. This act arose from a period of intense conflict at Syracuse between the pro-Roman aristocratic faction and the pro-Carthaginian democratic faction. Hannibal himself had sent two brothers of Syracusan descent, Hippocrates and Epicydes, in order to rouse the people against the Romans.

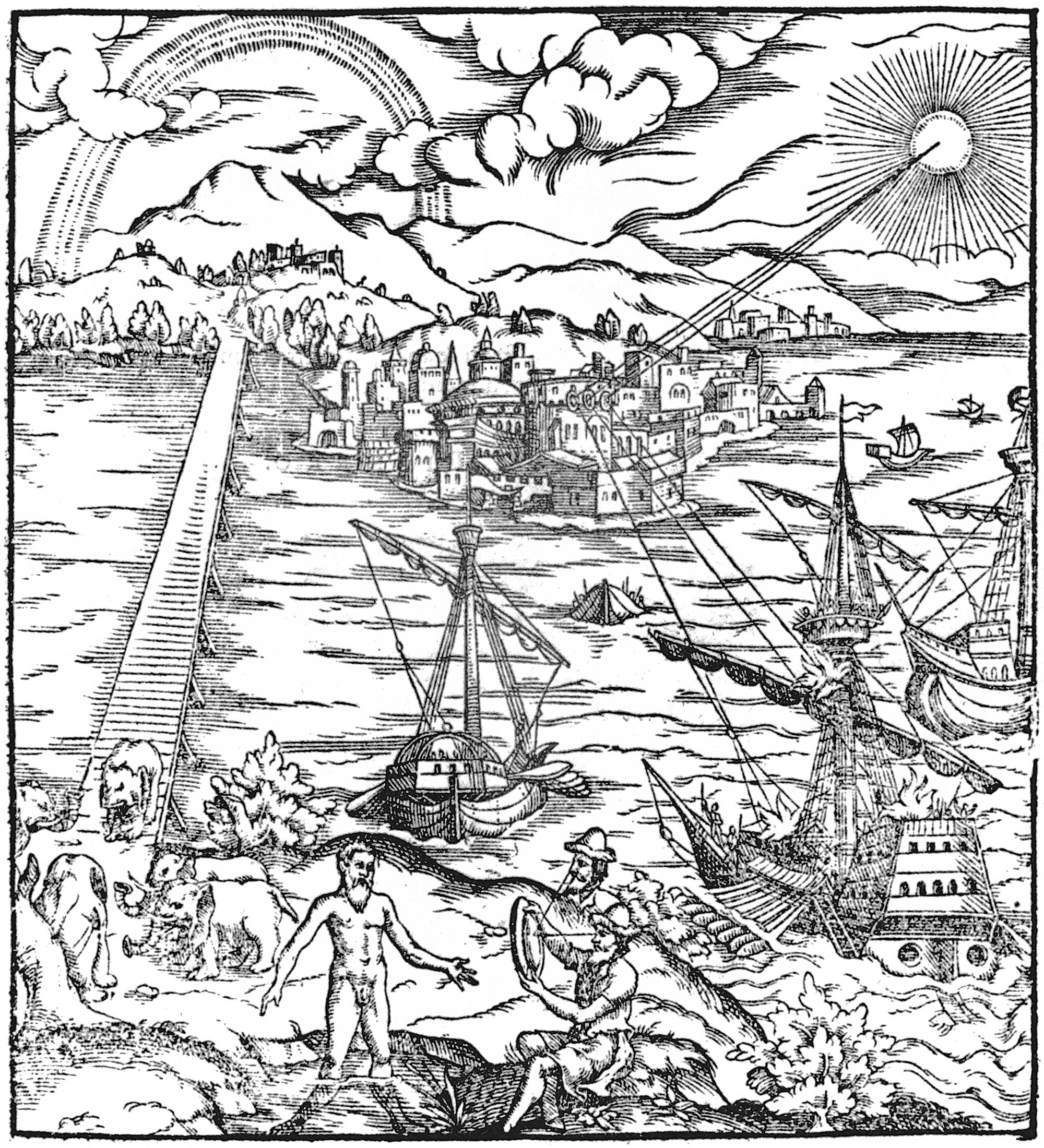
The burning glass allegedly used by Archimedes in the defense of Syracuse in 212 BC, depicted in the frontespiece of Opticae Thesaurus

The survivors from the Roman side of the Battle of Cannae were sent to Sicily and forbidden to leave until the end of hostilities. Hieronymus' decision to change sides caused Roman troops to be dispatched to the gates of Syracuse. The Carthaginians also sent troops to the island and contended with the Romans for control of the island. The conquest of Syracuse in 212 BC by the forces of Marcellus was a decisive moment for the war, which resulted either from the betrayal of the city by members of the Syracusan aristocracy, or by Moericus, a Spanish mercenary in the Carthaginian camp. The conquest of Syracuse was costly for the Romans on account of the topography of the city, the defensive machines built by Archimedes, and the extensive fortifications, especially the Euryalus fortress, originally built by the tyrant Dionysius I (404–367 BC) to protect the western end of Epipolae. The city was sacked and many inhabitants were killed, including Archimedes.

Marcellus then dispatched a lot of booty to Rome, including works taken from temples and public buildings (and was criticised for this by Polybius): according to Livy, it was the arrival of this booty that first gave rise to Roman enthusiasm for Greek art. The Romans considered it opportune to replace Marcellus, hated by the Syracusans, with Marcus Valerius Laevinus. Following these events, Syracuse was incorporated into the province of Sicily, becoming its capital and the seat of its governor.

The whole of Sicily was now in Roman hands, except for Agrigentum, which held out until 210 BC, when it was betrayed by Numidian mercenaries led by Mutines. In the summer, the time came to hold the comitia centuriata at Rome, in order to elect the consuls. The task of organising the elections was expected to fall to Marcellus as senior consul, but he sent a letter to the Senate when it recalled him, declaring that it would be harmful to the Republic to leave Hannibal to his own devices. When the Senate received this, there was debate as to whether it was better to recall the consul from campaign even though he was unwilling or to cancel the elections of consuls for 209 BC. In the end it was decided to recall Valerius Laevinus from Sicily, even though he was outside Italy. The senate ordered the Urban praetor, Lucius Manlius Acidinus to take a letter to Valerius, along with that sent to the Senate by Marcellus, and to explain to him why they had decided to recall him.

Valerius Laevinus set out from Rome with ten ships and arrived in Sicily safely, entrusted control of the province and command of the army to the praetor Lucius Cincius Alimentus, then sent the commander of the fleet, Marcus Valerius Messalla to Africa with part of the fleet to investigate the preparations of the Carthaginians and to raid their territory. When he returned to Rome, he informed the Senate that no Carthaginian forces remained on the island, that all the exiles had returned home and work had resumed in the fields. This was an exaggeration, insofar as Laevinius spent almost all of 209 BC trying to revive Sicilian agriculture. Not only was all independence of Sicily brought to an end, but the majority of the islands commercial activities were redirected toward Italy. However, in 210 BC, the Senate decided to restore autonomy to Syracuse, which retained a large hinterland.

=== Late Republic ===
Thereafter, Sicily became one of the most prosperous and peaceful Roman provinces, although it was disturbed by two serious rebellions. The first of these is known as the First Servile War (c.138–132 BC), was led by King Antiochus Eunus who established a capital at Enna and conquered Tauromenium as well. Eunus defeated the Roman army several times, but in 133 BC he was vanquished by Consul Publius Rupilius near Messina; the war ended with the capture of Tauromenium and Enna in 132 BC, and about 20,000 of the unfortunate slaves were crucified. The Second Servile War (104–101) was led by Athenion of Cilicia in the western part of the island and by Salvius Tryphon in the east. This war was terminated by Manius Aquillius.

==== Internal organisation ====
In the Roman Republican period Marcus Valerius Laevinus introduced the lex provinciae in 210 BC, the law regulating cities in provinces. The specific version of this law for Sicily, the Lex Rupilia, was completed after the First Servile War by the consul Publius Rupilius in 132 BC. All the Sicilian cities enjoyed a certain autonomy and issued small coins, and were divided into four legal and administrative classes, but none of them had the right of Roman citizenship:

1. foederatae civitates (allied communities)

This "first class" included Messina, Tauromenium and Notum that had remained loyal to Rome during the Punic wars of the 3rd century BC. They enjoyed greater freedom as a reward for their demonstrated friendship; their duties and rights as citizens were recognised and very rarely were they liable to pay the decuma (or tenth), or the tax on their harvest. They could also retain ownership of their lands, govern themselves and therefore were similar to the allied cities of the Italian peninsula.

2. civitates sine foedere immunes ac liberae (exempt and free communities without an alliance)

Halaesa Archonidea, Alicia, Centuripae, Segesta and Panormus were those in which Rome dictated their rights and duties. Although they were not allied, they were exempt from the payment of the decuma and could freely administer their internal affairs, without having to follow Roman law (ius romanus). They could elect their own magistrates, senate and, more significantly, they were free from the jurisdiction of provincial magistrates and their territory could not be legally administered by the praetor.

3. civitates decumanae (communities liable to the decuma tax)

Most of the Sicilian cities were civitates decumanae and did not enjoy the rights of the two previous classes as they had been conquered after offering resistance, having to pay Rome the decuma. This was regulated by the lex Hieronica, named for King Hiero II, which established the amount to be taxed on each crop of the territory.

4. civitates censoriae (communities subject to the censor)

Syracuse and Drepanum and at least four others had been conquered in war and thus they enjoyed neither rights nor privileges, although Syracuse became the capital of Sicily from 212 BC. Their land was taken by the Romans as an ager publicus, state land.

==== Sullan Period ====
At the end of Sulla's civil war, in 82 BC, the young general Pompey was sent to Sicily by the dictator, Sulla, to recover the island from the supporters of Marius and thereby secure the grain supply to Rome. Pompey crushed the opposition and, when the cities complained he responded with one of his most famous statements, reported by Plutarch as "why do you keep praising the laws before me when I am wearing a sword?" He expelled his enemies in Sicily, putting to death the consul Papirius Carbo.

The government of the island in this period was controlled by a praetor, who was assisted by two quaestores (who focussed on financial matters), one based at Syracuse and one at Lilybaeum. Some communities continued to possess a popular assembly, but there was an increasing concentration of power in the hands of local elites.

==== Praetorship of Gaius Verres ====
From 73 to 71 BC, the praetor of the province was Gaius Verres who was denounced by the Sicilians for extortion, theft, and robbery and was prosecuted in Rome by Cicero whose speeches against him, known as the Verrines, still survive. Since these speeches are the main evidence for Verres' actions, it is hard to get an objective idea of the impact of his activities on Sicily. Cicero emphasised Verres' very harsh implementation of the grain tax (for his personal profit rather than that of the Republic) and the theft of artworks, including sacred votive offerings. Verres had expected the power of his friends and the deft manipulation of legal procedure to ensure his acquittal, but after Cicero's blisteringly effective first speech, he fled into exile.

==== War on Pirates ====
In 70 BC, the praetor Caecilius Metellus fought successfully against the pirates which infested the seas around Sicily and Campania, who went on to plunder Gaeta and Ostia (69–68 BC) and captured the daughter of Marcus Antonius Orator at Misenum. In the course of the subsequent war against the pirates in 67 BC, the sea around Sicily was assigned to Plotius Varus. In 61 BC, Clodius was sent to the island as quaestor.

=== Sicilian Revolt ===
After Verres, Sicily recovered rapidly, although not reimbursed for the robberies of the former praetor. Nor did Caesar's Civil War (49–45 BC) interrupt business as usual. Caesar's opponents had grasped the strategic importance of the island of Sicily as a base for attacking North Africa or for defending against an attack from Africa. However, after Julius Caesar crossed the Rubicon and began the civil war he took control of the island; Asinius Pollio was sent as Caesar's emissary, to remove the governor of the island at the time, Cato. The Caesarians were therefore able to embark from Lilybaeum to attack the supporters of Pompey in North Africa.

The situation changed with the assassination of Caesar (44 BC). In 42 BC, Sextus Pompey, son of Pompey Magnus, was appointed commander of the Roman fleet gathered at Massalia by the Senate. He came into conflict with the Second Triumvirate, consisting of Octavian, Mark Antony, and Lepidus and was proscribed under the lex Pedia for collecting other proscribed individuals and slaves from Epirus and carrying out various acts of piracy. He therefore took control Mylae, Tyndaris and then Messana. After this, all of Sicily had to submit to him. First he killed the praetor, Aulus Pompeius Bithynicus and then he defeated Octavian's legatus, Quintus Salvidienus Rufus in a naval battle off Rhegium (40 BC). Sextus Pompey was able to prevent the supply of grain to Rome from Sicily. Initially, Octavian could do little about this, but then the people at Rome forced a compromise. Thus in 39 BC, Sextus Pompey and the Second Triumvirate signed the Pact of Misenum, which recognised Sextus Pompey's control of Sicily, Sardinia and Corsica and granted freedom to the slaves in his custody. In exchange, Sextus Pompey promised to end the blockade of Rome, resume the Sicilian grain supply to Rome and not to gather any more slaves. The agreement did not hold and triumvirs turned their attention on Sicily. The conflict involved perhaps 200,000 men and 1,000 warships and wrecked great devastation on Sicily. The territory of Tyndaris and Messina was the most damaged.

Octavian was defeated at sea in the Battle of Messina (37 BC) and again in August 36 BC. But Octavian's lieutenant, Agrippa, a commander of great talent was able to destroy Sextus' fleet a month later at the Battle of Naulochus in September 36 BC. Octavian imposed a heavy indemnity on Sicily of 1,600 talents and the cities that had resisted him were harshly punished. Thirty thousand slaves in Sextus Pompey's service were captured; the majority were returned to their masters, but about 6,000, who had no masters, were impaled.

After the Battle of Actium in 31 BC, Octavian had sole power over the Roman Republic. In 27 BC, the Senate formalised this situation and he assumed the title of Augustus.

=== Augustan reorganisation ===
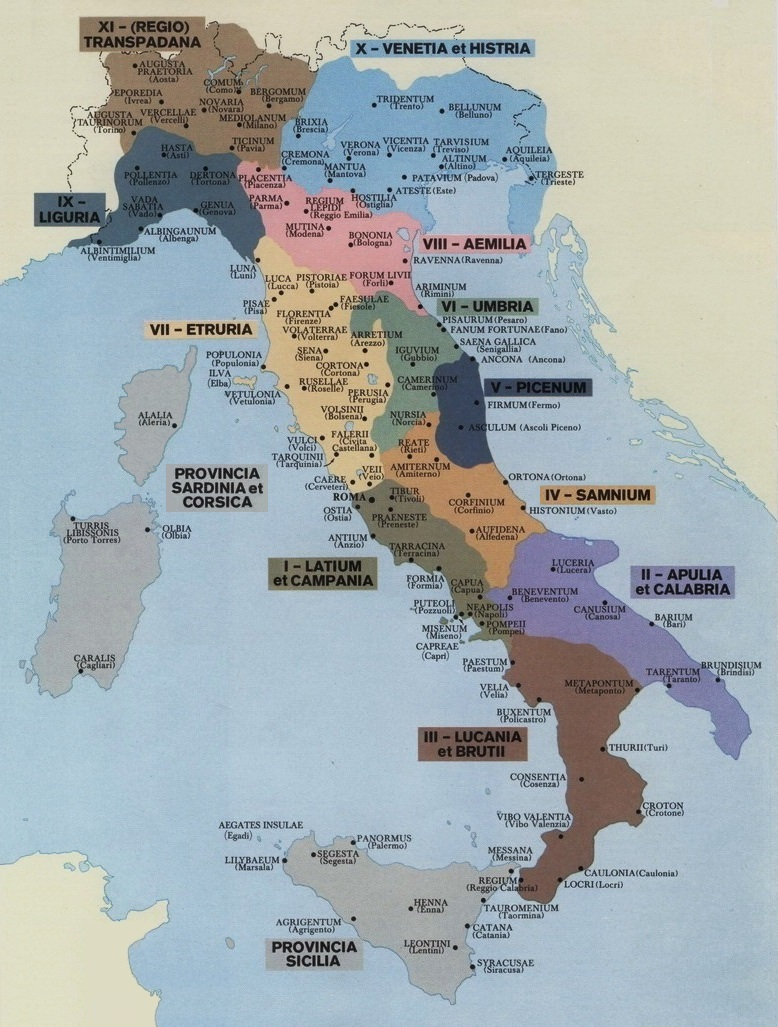
The regiones of Augustan Italy (around AD 7)

At the end of the conflict between the triumvirs and Sextus Pompey, Sicily was devastated: cities and countryside had been damaged by warfare and a lot of land remained uncultivated because the proprietors were dead or had fled, or their land had been confiscated by Octavian as punishment. A portion of Sicily remained imperial property, while large areas, probably in the Plain of Catania, were given to Agrippa. When he died, the majority of his property passed to Augustus and it is possible that other Sicilian land came into Augustus' possession in a similar way. Other farmland, especially on the eastern and northern coasts, was given to Italian veterans who had served in Augustus' legions.

Augustus carried out an administrative reorganisation of the empire as a whole and of the province of Sicily in particular. A number of coloniae were established by Augustus for his veterans on Sicily, but the exact chronology is unclear. We know for certain that the first measures were taken in 36 BC, when Tauromenium was made into a colonia. Subsequently, Augustus visited Sicily in 22 or 21 BC, the first stop on a journey through the empire, and other reforms were carried out. At the end of the process, six Sicilian cities had become coloniae: Syracuse, Tauromenium, Panormus, Catania, Tyndaris, and Thermae Himerenses. The influx of population represented by these foundations may have been intended to compensate for a demographic slump resulting from the war with Sextus Pompey, or from Augustus' excoriation of the island after his victory. It is not clear what happened to the existing Greek inhabitants of these cities as normally the citizens of coloniae had Roman citizenship and could therefore participate in the highest levels of the Roman state. It may be that these privileges were restricted to the aristocracy. In any case, the influx of Italian veterans played a decisive role in the diffusion of Latin language in Sicily.

Messina, Lipara, and perhaps Lilybaeum, Agregentum, and Halaesa were made into municipia, a status significantly lower than that of colonia. No veterans were settled in these settlements; they were simply compensated for their loyalty by Augustus.

Centuripa, Notum, and Segesta were converted into "Latin" cities, while the remaining cities retained their status as foreign communities under the control of Rome.

None of the privileges conceded to the various centres implied exemption from paying tribute to Rome. It is reasonable to presume that, like other coloniae outside Italy, the Sicilian coloniae paid tribute. The grain tithe was replaced by the stipendium, a property tax, and there may also have been a poll tax. It is possible that Augustus made this reform as a result of the new role played by Egypt as the source of the grain supply, although the produce of the Emperor's Sicilian farms continued to be sent to Rome.

=== Imperial province ===
In AD 68, there was disorder on the island, probably linked to the revolt of Lucius Clodius Macer in North Africa. Emperor Vespasian (69–79) settled veterans and freedmen at Panormos and Segesta.

During the first two centuries AD Sicily underwent economic depression and urban life declined, the countryside was deserted and the wealthy owners were not resident, as indicated by the lack of dwellings at various levels. In addition, the Roman government neglected the territory and it became a place of exile and refuge for slaves and brigands. According to the Historia Augusta (a notoriously unreliable fourth century text), there was a slave revolt in Sicily under the Emperor Gallienus (253–268).

The latifundia, or great private estates, specialising in agriculture destined for export (grain, olive oil, wine) played a large role in society and in the economy in the imperial period.

Rural Sicily entered a new period of prosperity at the beginning of the 4th century, with commercial settlements and farm villages that seem to reach the pinnacle of their expansion and activity. The reasons seem to be twofold: first of all, renewed commercial links with North Africa expanded for the supplies of grain to Italy, while the Egyptian production, which had so far satisfied the needs of Rome, was sent to the new capital of Constantinople in 330 AD; Sicily consequently assumed a central role in the new commercial routes between the two continents. Secondly, the most prosperous equestrian and senatorial ranks began to abandon urban life by retreating to their country estates, due to the growing tax burden and the expenses they were obliged to sustain the poor masses. Their lands were cultivated no longer by slaves, but by colonists. Considerable sums of money were spent to enlarge, embellish, and make their villas more comfortable.

Traces of renewed construction are found in Filosofiana, Sciacca, Punta Secca, Naxos and elsewhere. An obvious sign of transformation is the new title assigned to the governor of the island, from a corrector to consularis. In the 4th century therefore, Sicily was not merely the “granary of Rome”, but also became a favourite residence for families of the high Roman aristocracy, like the Symmachi, Nichomachi and the Caeionii, who brought with them the luxury and taste of the capital of the empire.

The most remarkable archaeological remains of this period are the Villa Romana del Casale. Others include the Villa Romana del Tellaro and Villa Romana di Patti.

==== Latifundia ====
The origin of the latifundia in Sicily, as elsewhere, was the ager publicus from the spoils of war, confiscated from conquered peoples from the early 2nd century BC. Latifundia could be used for livestock (sheep and cattle) or cultivation of olive oil, grain, and wine. They distressed Pliny the Elder (died AD 79) as he travelled, seeing only slaves working the land, not the sturdy Roman farmers who had been the backbone of the Republic's army. He argued that the latifundia had ruined Italy and would ruin the Roman provinces as well.

The latifundia quickly started economic consolidation as larger estates achieved greater economies of scale and senators did not pay land taxes. Owners re-invested their profits by purchasing smaller neighbouring farms, since smaller farms had a lower productivity and could not compete, in an ancient precursor of agribusiness. By the 2nd century AD, latifundia had displaced small farms as the agricultural foundation of the Roman Empire. This effect contributed to the destabilising of Roman society; as the small farms of the Roman peasantry were bought up by the wealthy and with their vast supply of slaves, the landless peasantry were forced into idleness, relying greatly on handouts.

=== Arrival of Christianity in Sicily ===
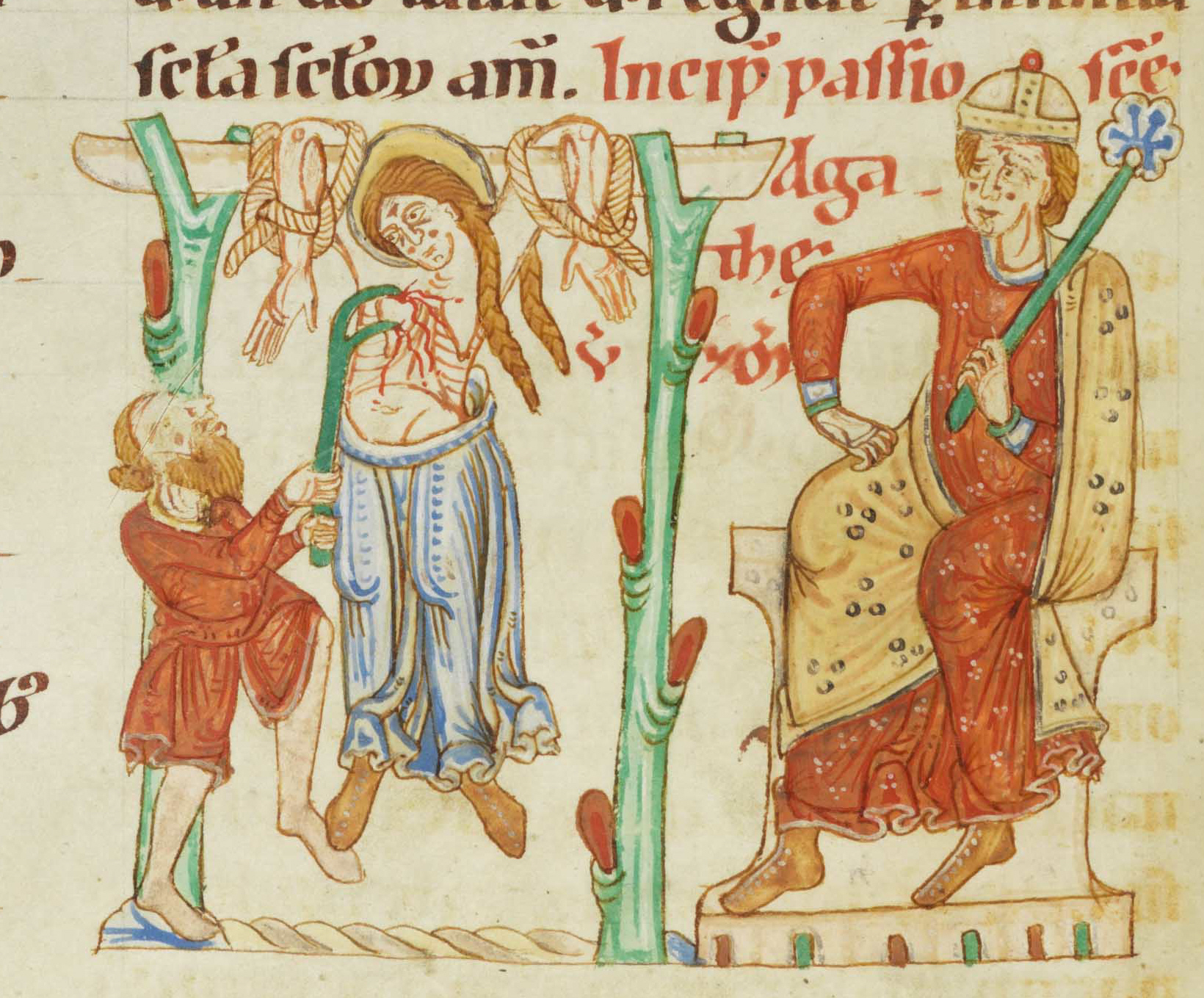
The martyrdom of Saint Agatha (Cod. Bodmer 127, fol. 39v, end of the 12th century)

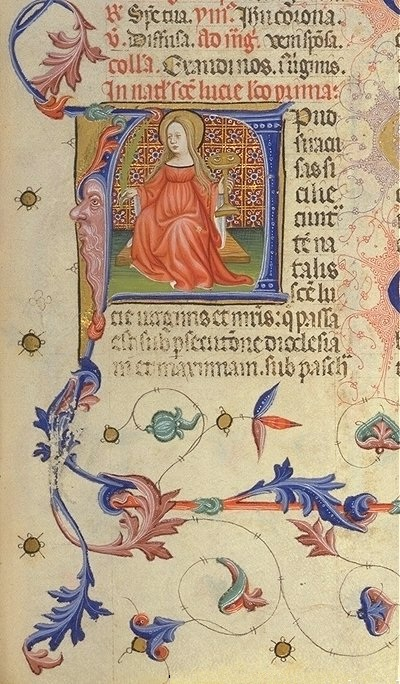
Saint Lucy depicted in the Breviarium of Martin of Aragon

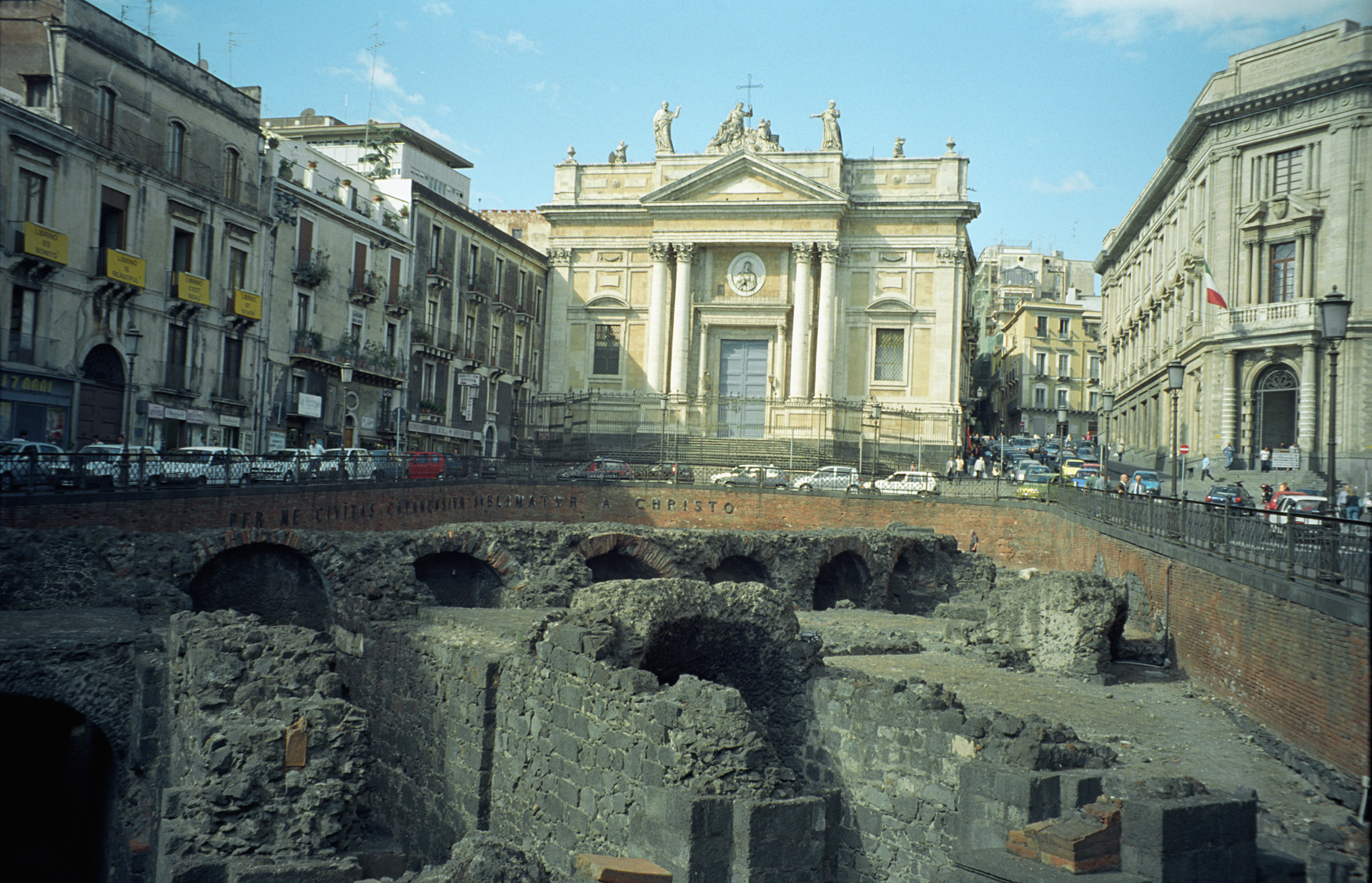
The Roman amphitheatre of Catania (c. 2nd century AD) and in the background the Church of San Biagio, built in the 18th century after the massive earthquake of 1693 on the location where tradition claims St Agatha was martyred in a furnace

The first reference to a Christian presence on the island appears in Acts (28.12–13): "We landed in Syracuse, where we remained for three days and then we travelled along the coast and arrived at Rhegion." In this way, Paul of Tarsus, on his voyage from the Levant to Rome, which is described at the end of Acts, travelled through Sicily. He stopped in Syracuse after having been shipwrecked and forced to disembark on Malta. From Malta, according to the account in Acts, Paul travelled to Syracuse, but it is not clear why he stopped there. It is clear that Syracuse was still used in this period as a stop on the way to Rome on commercial trade routes. Perhaps Paul was hosted by a Jewish community, such as existed in many ports of the Mediterranean – the Jewish community at Catania is well-attested epigraphically. After Paul, there are no sources before the 3rd century AD which expressly mention a Christian presence on the island.

There are various legends which link the arrival of Christianity in Sicily with Paul's brief sojourn on the island, while other traditions report that Paul met Christians who had already arrived before him and that this was the reason why he stopped on the island. But Acts doesn't mention any of this and these traditions may respond to the desire to make the arrival of Christianity in Sicily as early as possible (60 or even 40 AD), in order to reinforce the authority of the Sicilian church.

The first certain reference to a Sicilian church is found in an official letter (Epist. 30.5.2), sent from Rome to Cyprian, Bishop of Carthage. This document dates between 250 and 251 during the Decian persecution and discusses the lapsi – Christians who had performed acts of worship to pagan deities in the face of Roman persecutions. The letter mentions a similar letter sent to Sicily, which suggests that apostasy was considered a problem on the island as well and that the Christian presence on Sicily was already significant enough to have a hierarchical relationship with Rome. It is possible that this community developed at the end of the 2nd century AD or at the beginning of the 3rd century – the period in which the first archaeological evidence appears.

The Decian (AD 250) and Diocletianic Persecutions (304) are the setting for the stories of two important Sicilian martyrs, Saint Agatha and Saint Lucy. These saints are known only from hagiographies written about two hundred years after the events, which represent them as young and beautiful virgins, victims of two persecutors called Quintianus and Pascasius. It is likely that these sources respond to a desire to link the two most important cities of eastern Sicily: Catania, home of Saint Agatha, and Syracuse, home of Saint Lucy. Significantly, all the principal saints of the island are women – in addition to Agatha and Lucy, there are the Palermitan saints, Nympha (4th century martyr), Olivia (5th century martyr), and Christina (martyred in 304), who was introduced into the cult of Saint Rosalia by the Palermitans. Perhaps this emphasis on female figures in Sicilian Christianity reflects the emphasis on female deities in pre-Christian Sicilian religion (e.g. Venus of Eryx, Isis, Demeter and Kore).

Two important Christian inscriptions have been discovered from the period. One is the Epitaph of Julia Florentina, discovered at Catania in 1730 (in the necropolis on the site of the modern via Dottor Consoli) and now in the Louvre in Paris. It is a funerary inscription, dating to the end of the 3rd century AD at the earliest, which records in Latin the death of a child of little more than a year in age, buried next to the "Christian martyrs" (but it is not clear whether this refers to Agatha and Euplius). The inscription is the first direct evidence for Christianity on the island. The other inscription, also sepulchral, is the so-called Inscription of Euskia in Greek, which was discovered at the end of the 19th century in the Catacombs of San Giovanni in Syracuse and is now housed in the Museo archeologico regionale Paolo Orsi. The grave stele indicates a local cult of Lucy at the beginning of the 5th century. At the time of the inscription's creation, the cult of Agatha is already attested at Rome and Carthage.

With the end of the period of the persecutions, the church entered a phase of expansion, even as fierce debates arose within the church on doctrinal point, leading to the convocation of synods. Eusebius includes a letter of Constantine to Crestus, Bishop of Syracuse, in his Church History (10.5.21), which invites him to participate in the Council of Arles of AD 314. Cresto was assigned an important organisational role at Arles, which indicates the relevance of the Sicilian church at the time.

The beginning of monasticism in Sicily came in the 4th century. The hagiographic tradition reports that the ascetic Hilarion travelled from Egypt to Pachino and then spent three years in Sicily (perhaps near modern Ispica), where he sought a retreat in which to practice the life of an anchorite. He subsequently departed as a result of his growing fame in the region. More significant for Sicily was the arrival of cenobitic monasticism: there are many reports of different kinds of ascetics gathering together to share a religious life, especially under the Basilian rule (there were no monasteries in Sicily organised under the Benedictine rule until the Norman period). Some monks followed the Byzantine Rite, others the Latin rite. The growth of monasticism in Sicily was probably due to its insularity, as well as the fact that the region, excepting a few slave revolts, was one of the most peaceful in the west – at least until the Vandal conquest of 439, and then again until the 9th century Arab conquest.

=== The fall of the Western Empire and Sicily ===
The 5th century Migration Period was a period of serious crisis for the Roman Empire. The relative tranquility of Sicily in this period attracted many people. Just as in earlier periods, many senatorial families had been spurred to acquire vast estates of fertile land. High functionaries and religious officials (both Christian and pagan) travelled to Sicily to dedicate themselves to study, hunting and entertainment. Nicomachus Flavianus the Younger, praefectus urbi between 361 and 362, had an estate near Enna, where he produced a revised edition of the first ten books of Livy in 408. Others came as refugees, such as Melania the Younger, who fled Alaric's sack of Rome and took refuge at Messina with her husband and friends in 410. Alaric attempted to attack Sicily itself and got as far as Rhegium, but the Gothic fleet was destroyed in the Straits of Messina by a storm and Alaric therefore abandoned the plan.

Genseric, King of the Vandals, occupied the province of Africa in the 430s and began to raid the Sicilian coast in 437. Then, after seizing part of the Western Roman fleet berthed at Carthage after taking the city in October 439, the Vandals organised attacks throughout the Mediterranean, especially in Sicily and Sardinia (the main sources of grain for the western empire), Corsica, and the Balearic islands. In 441, since the western Roman fleet had proven incapable of defeating the Vandals, Theodosius II sent an expedition in 442 but it accomplished nothing and was recalled because of attacks by Persians and Huns along the northern and eastern borders. The Western Roman empire continued to defend Sicily, with the general Ricimer active there in 456 and then Marcellinus and his Dalmatian legions in 461. The Vandal presence in Sicily was limited to piratical raids, similar to those undertaken in southern Italy. A panegyric of 468 by Sidonius Apollinaris indicates that in this period, Sicily was still part of the Western Roman Empire. In 469 the island fell to the Vandal King Geiseric but was reunited with Italy in 476 under Odoacer with a toe-hold allowed the Vandals in the port of Lilybaeum. This was ceded to Theodoric the Great in 493.

== Language ==
In the Republican period, the main language was still Greek, since the Romans had no policy of enforcing their language on communities. Even in the period of Cicero, Greek was the main language used by the elite and almost all the Sicilians mentioned by Cicero in the Verrine Orations have Greek names. Cicero also refers to the Greek calendar (in use throughout Sicily in this period), Greek festivals, relations between the Sicilian cities and panhellenic sanctuaries like Delphi, Sicilian victors of the Olympic Games, and Greek civic architecture. Literature remained almost exclusively Greek, with authors like Diodorus Siculus and Caecilius of Calacte.

The non-Greek languages of Sicily (Sican, Sicel, Elymian, and Punic) probably continued to be spoken in the countryside and employed in traditional religious cults, but were absent from elite and written contexts. There is direct testimony only for Punic (a brief inscription of the 2nd or 1st century BC from Aegusa). Some Mamertines probably retained their Italic dialect.

At the beginning of the Imperial period, with the founding of six Roman coloniae for veterans at Syracuse, Tauromenium, Panormus, Catania, Tyndaris, and Thermae Himerenses, and the settlement of Italian veterans in large areas of agricultural land, particularly along the eastern and northern coasts of the island, Sicily received a large influx of Latin speakers for the first time and a Latin-Greek bilingualism developed which continued until the Byzantine period. Generally, in the Imperial period, Latin replaced Greek in an ever-increasing number of areas, while Greek was confined to lower registers, although it retained its historic prestige and was widely used by the population. Latin became firmly established as the elite language, with Calpurnius Siculus, Flavius Vopiscus, and Julius Firmicus Maternus producing literary works in Latin, although there are also examples of Sicilian authors who wrote in Greek during the Imperial period, such as Pantaenus, Aristocles of Messene, Probus of Lilybaeum, and Citharius. In this period the non-Greek languages must have definitively disappeared, although Punic may still have been spoken at the end of the Imperial period based on the testimony of Apuleius. Numerous Jewish and Samaritan communities are attested on the island in the Imperial period, although they usually appear in the record using Greek or Latin. From the 5th century the Greek language appears to have experienced a recovery that lasted into the period of Muslim domination.

== Major centres ==
=== Syracuse ===
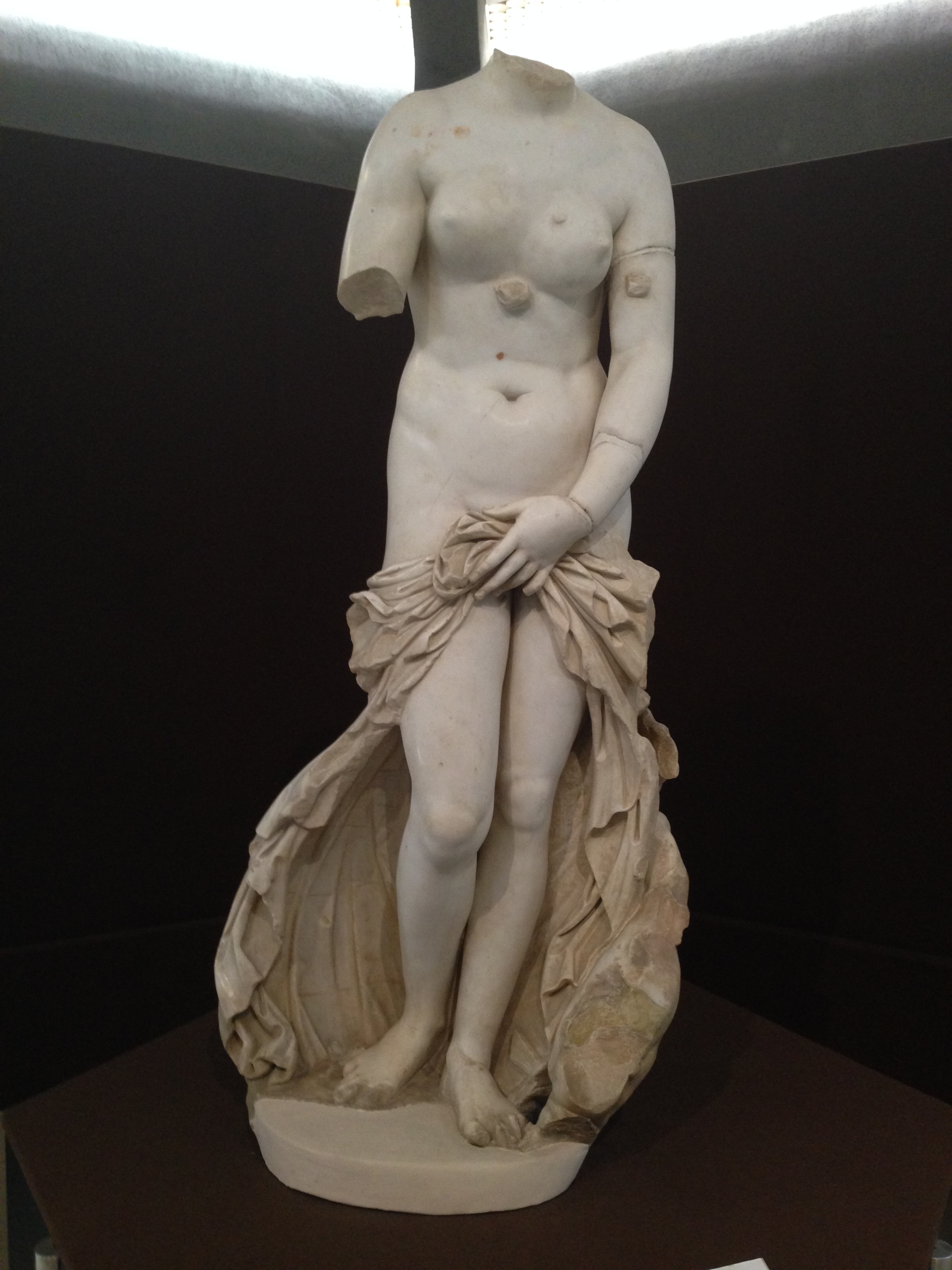
Landolina Venus, 2nd century Roman copy of Hellenistic original. Discovered 1804 in Syracuse. (Museo archeologico regionale Paolo Orsi)

Syracusae became the capital of the new Roman province after 212 BC. Despite the misgovernment and systematic despoliation of its artistic heritage by Gaius Verres, Syracuse remained the capital of the province and seat of its praetor. It continued to be a key port for commercial interaction between east and west. St Paul and Marcian of Syracuse (the first Bishop of Syracuse) spent time in the city proselytising. As a result of the Roman persecution of the Christians before the Edict of Constantine in AD 313, a deep network of catacombs were built under the city, second only to those of Rome. Successive attacks, starting with those of the Vandals in 440, impoverished the city until it was conquered by the Byzantine general Belisarius in 535. From 663 to 668, the city was the residence of Emperor Constans II and the metropolis of all churches in Sicily.

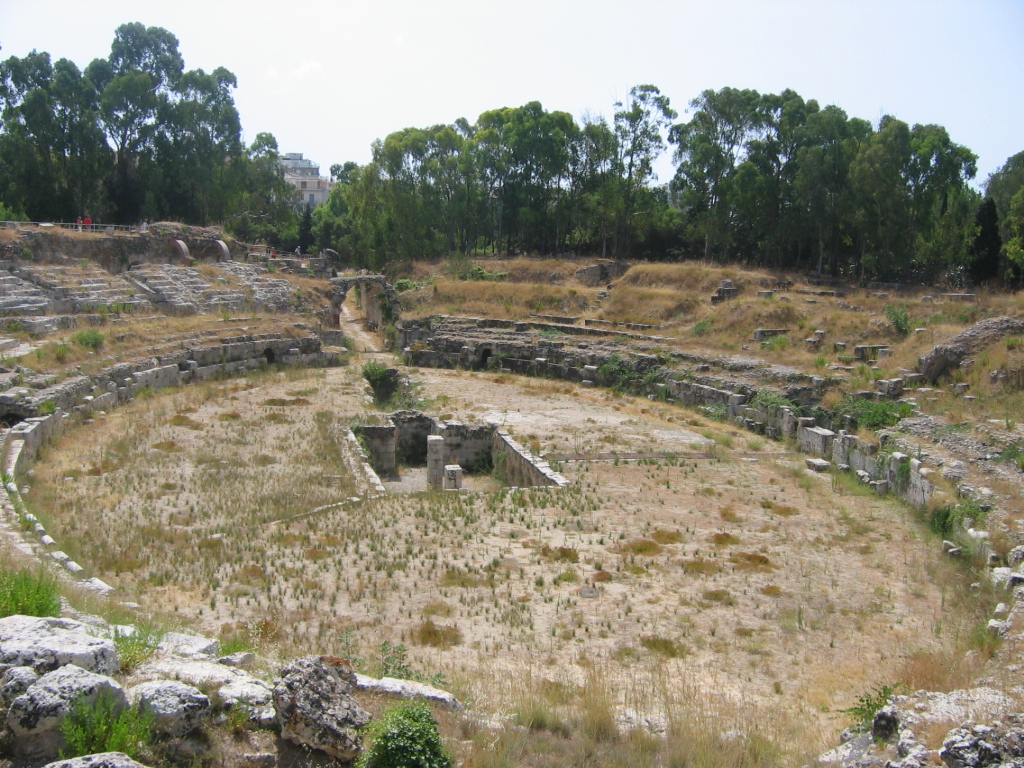
Roman amphitheatre of Syracuse

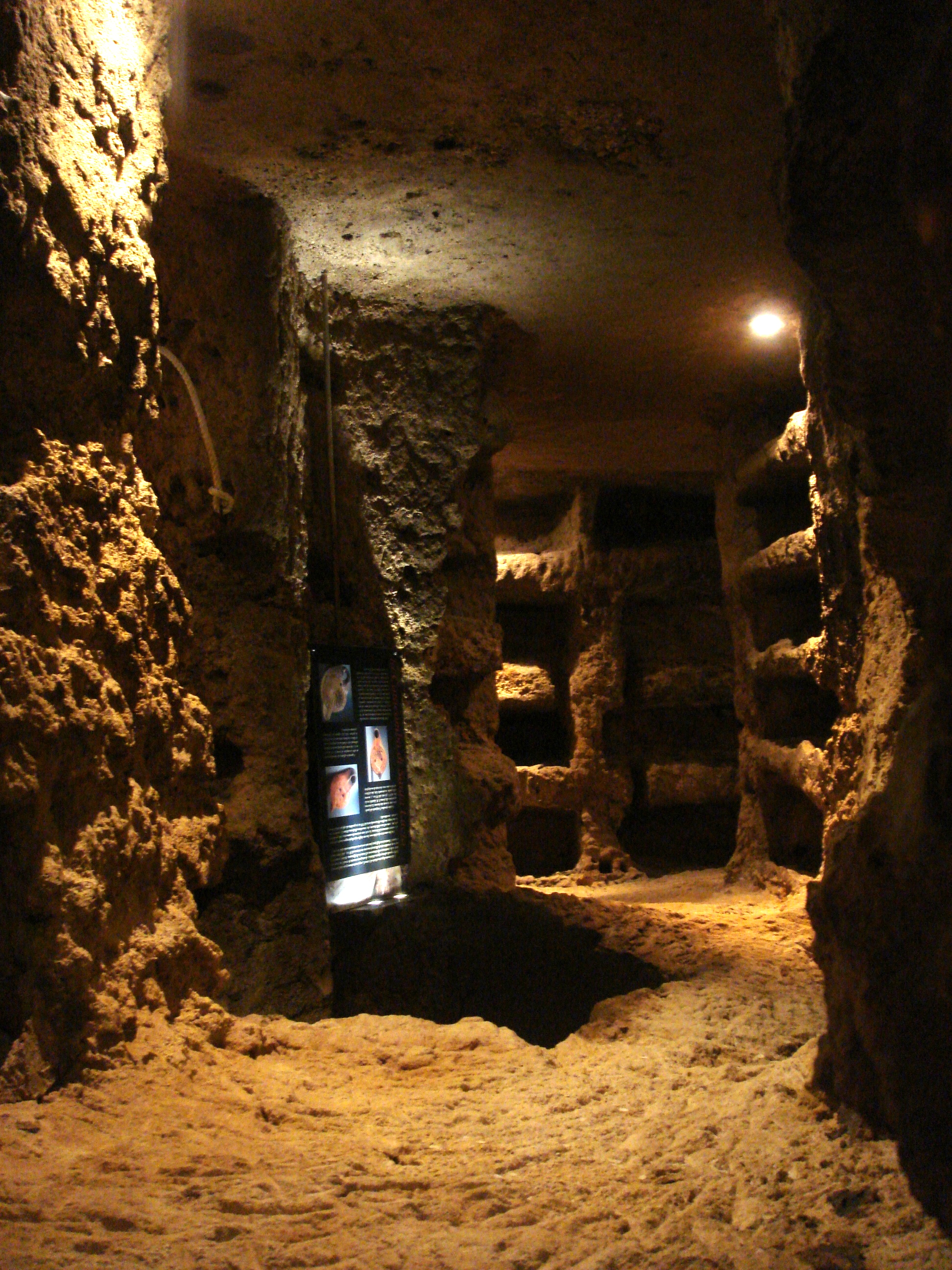
Catacombs of Syracuse

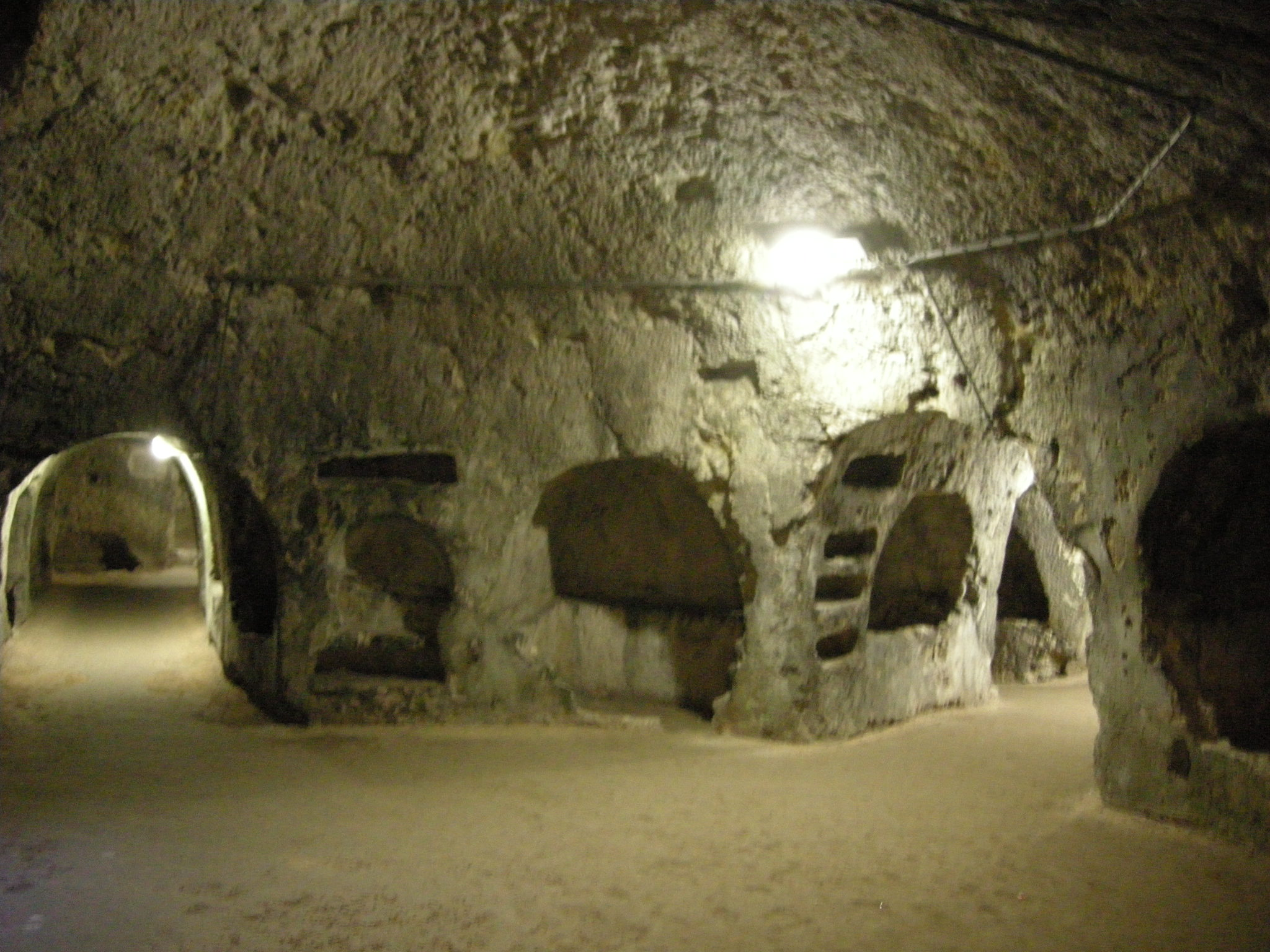
Catacombs of Syracuse

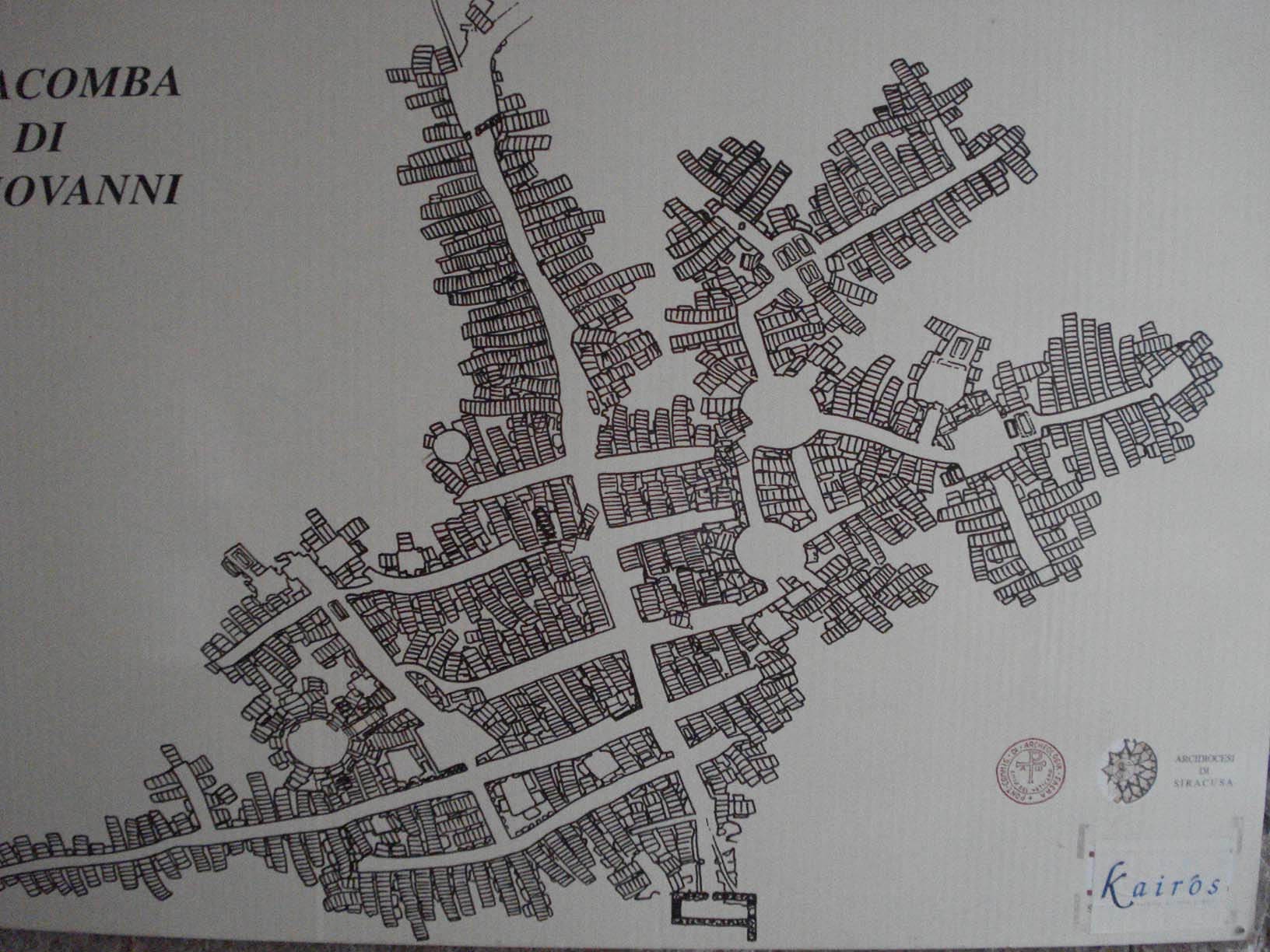
Map of the catacombs of Syracuse

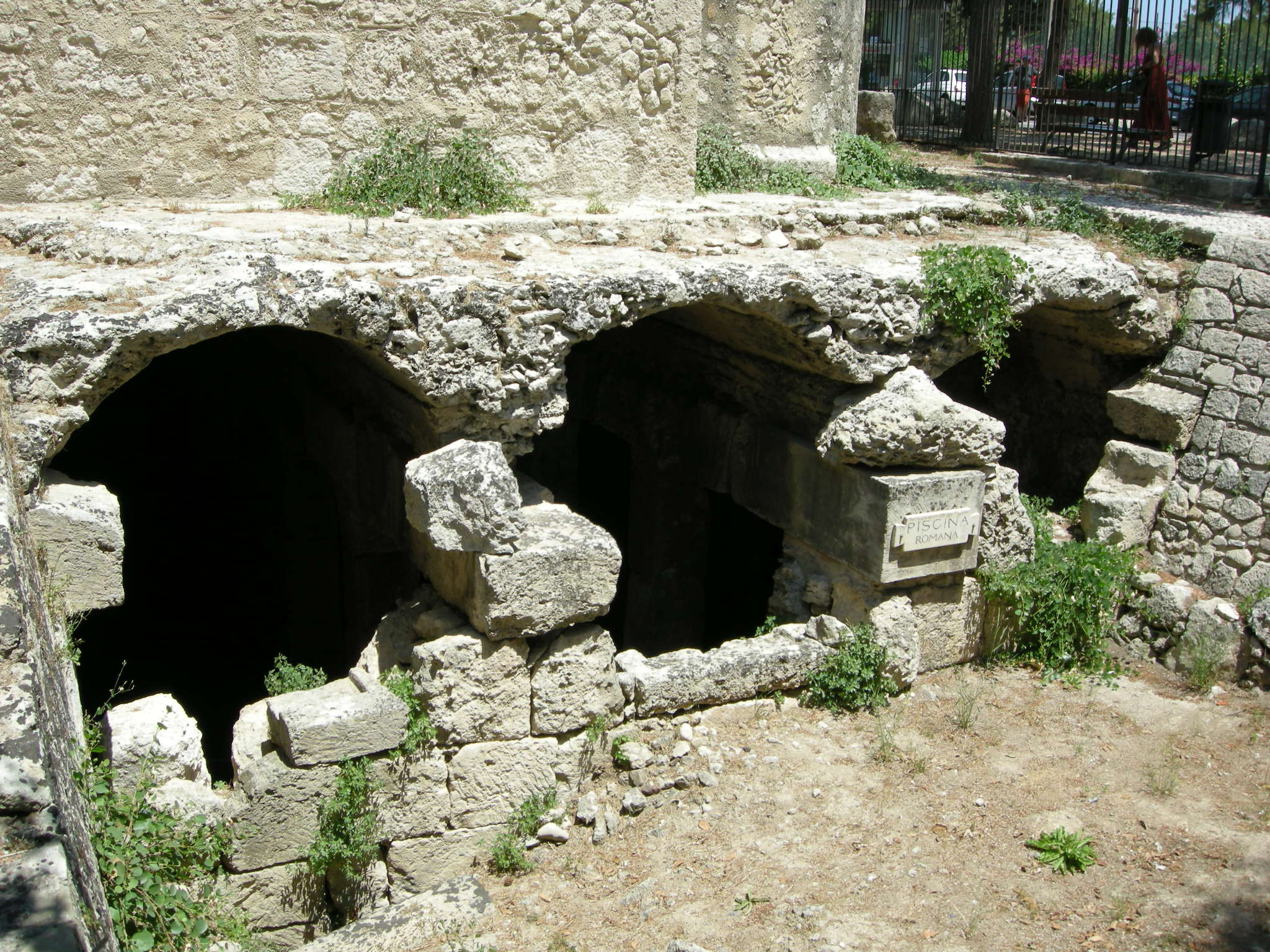
Roman baths

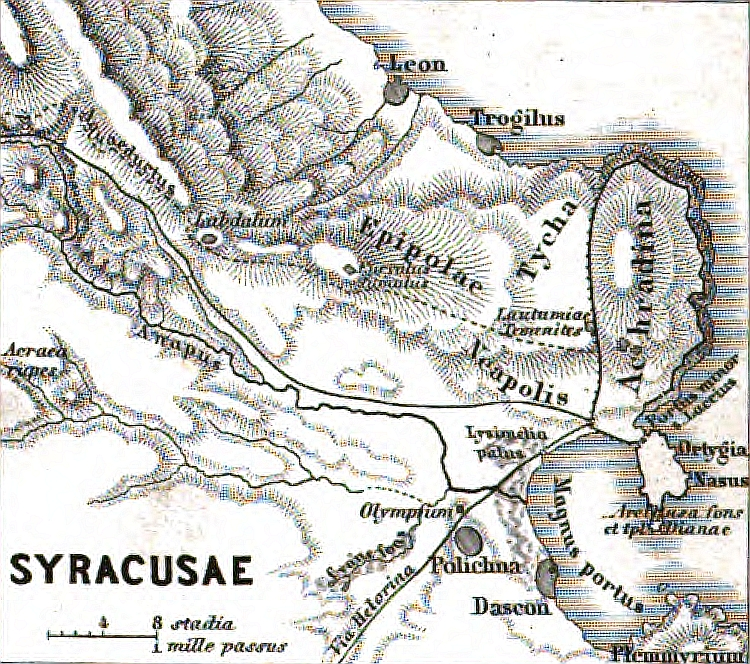
Map of ancient Syracuse

=== Catania ===
Catana or Catina (Catania) was conquered at the beginning of the First Punic War, in 263 BC, by the Consul Manius Valerius Maximus Corvinus Messalla. Part of the booty from the conquest was a sundial which was set up in the Comitium in Rome. Additionally the city was required to pay tribute to Rome (civitas decumana). The conqueror of Syracuse, Marcus Claudius Marcellus built a gymnasium in the city. Around 135 BC, in the course of the First Servile War, the city was conquered by the rebel slaves. Another revolt in the area, led by the gladiator Seleurus in 35 BC, was probably suppressed after the death of its leader. In 122 BC, following volcanic activity on Etna, there was heavy damage from the volcanic ash raining down on the roofs of the city which collapsed under the weight. The territory of Catina was further impacted by eruptions in 50, 44, 36 BC and finally by the disastrous lava flow of 32 BC, which ruined the countryside and the city of Aitna, as well as the disastrous war between Augustus and Sextus Pompey, but with the beginning of the Augustan period, a long and difficult socio-economic recovery began. At the end of the war, all Sicily is described as heavily damaged, impoverished, and depopulated in a wide range of areas. In book 6 of Strabo in particular there is reference to the deleterious state of Syracuse, Catania, and Centuripe. After the war against Sextus Pompey, Augustus established a colonia in Catania. Pliny the Elder lists the city, which the Romans called Catina among the cities which Augustus promoted to the rank of Colonia Romana in 21 BC, along with Syracuse and Thermae (Sciacca). Groups of veterans of the Roman army were settled in the cities which had received this new status. The new demographic situation certainly contributed to change the style of municipal life in favour of the new "Middle Class." Catania retained a notable importance and wealth in the course of the late Republic and the Empire: Cicero calls it the "richest" of the cities and it must have remained thus in the later Imperial period and Byzantine times, as the literary sources and numerous contemporary monuments suggest, which makes the city almost unique among those of Roman Sicily. In order to pay the stipendium, the large coastal cities like Catania, extended their control in the course of the High Empire, over a vast swath of the interior of the island which had become depopulated as a result of the large estates which dominated agriculture in the period. Christianity spread rapidly; among the martyrs during the persecutions of Decius and Diocletian, were Saint Agatha, patron saint of the city, and Euplius. The Diocese of Catania was established at the end of the 6th century.

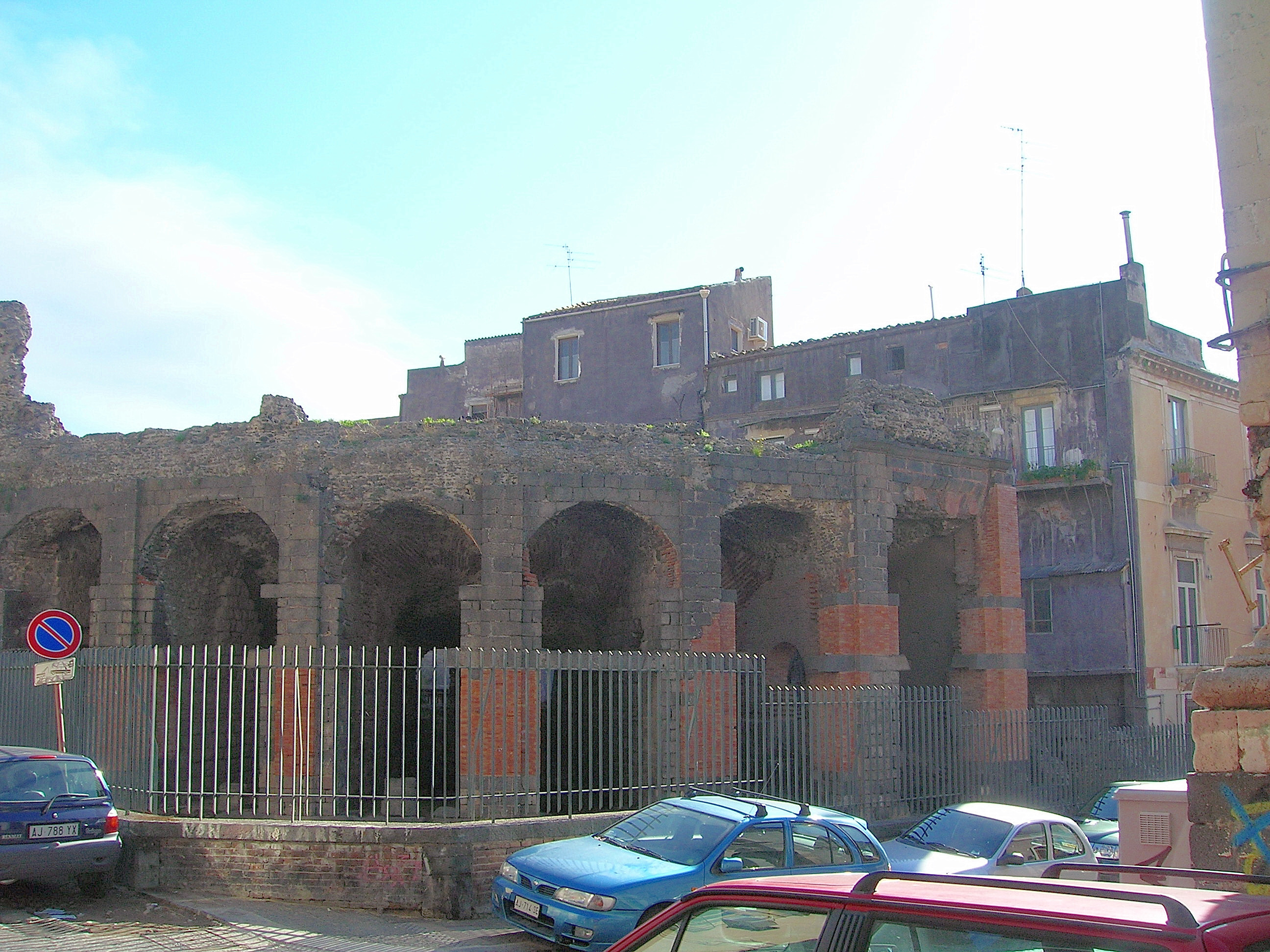
Roman Odeon

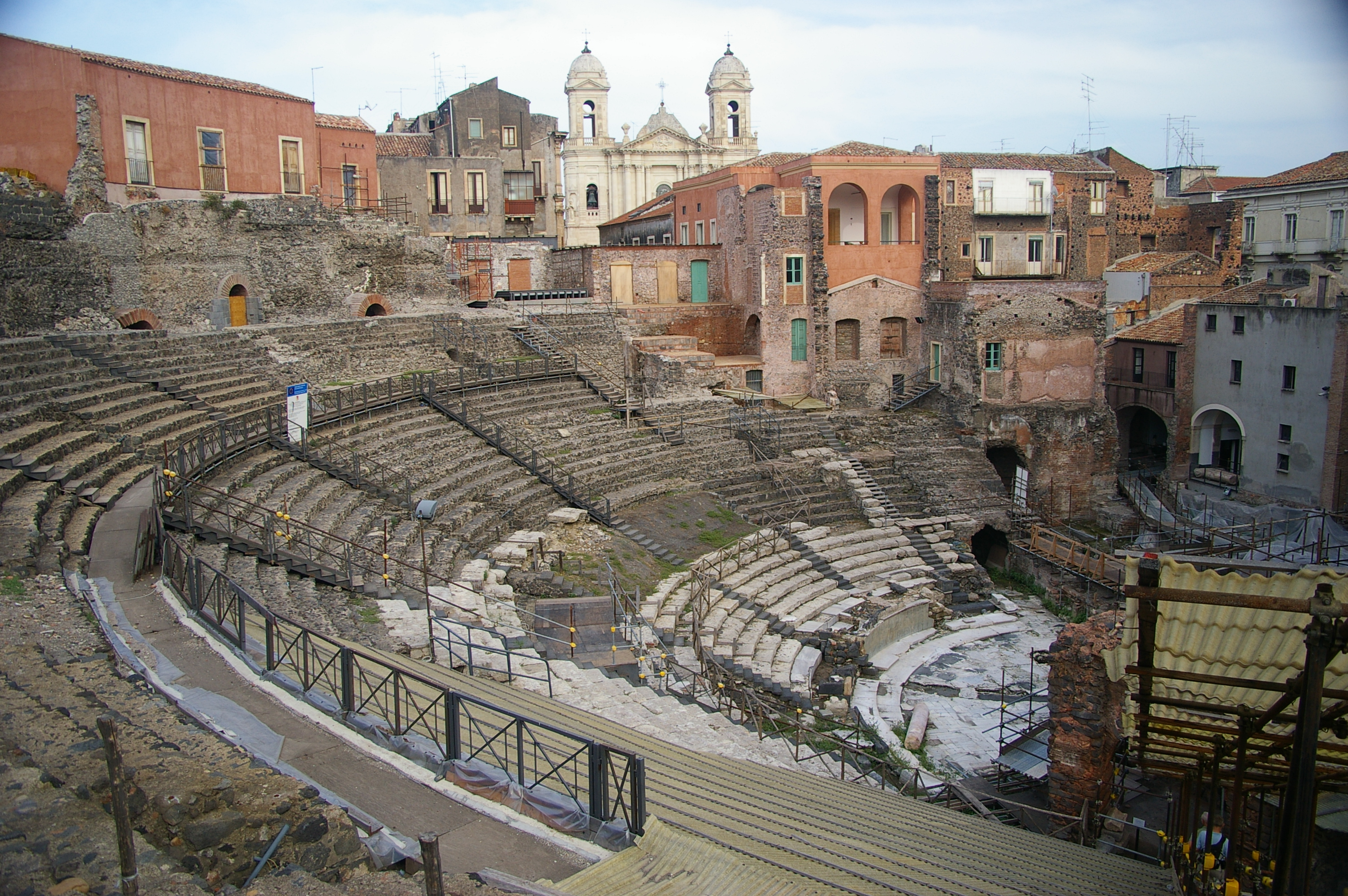
Roman Theatre

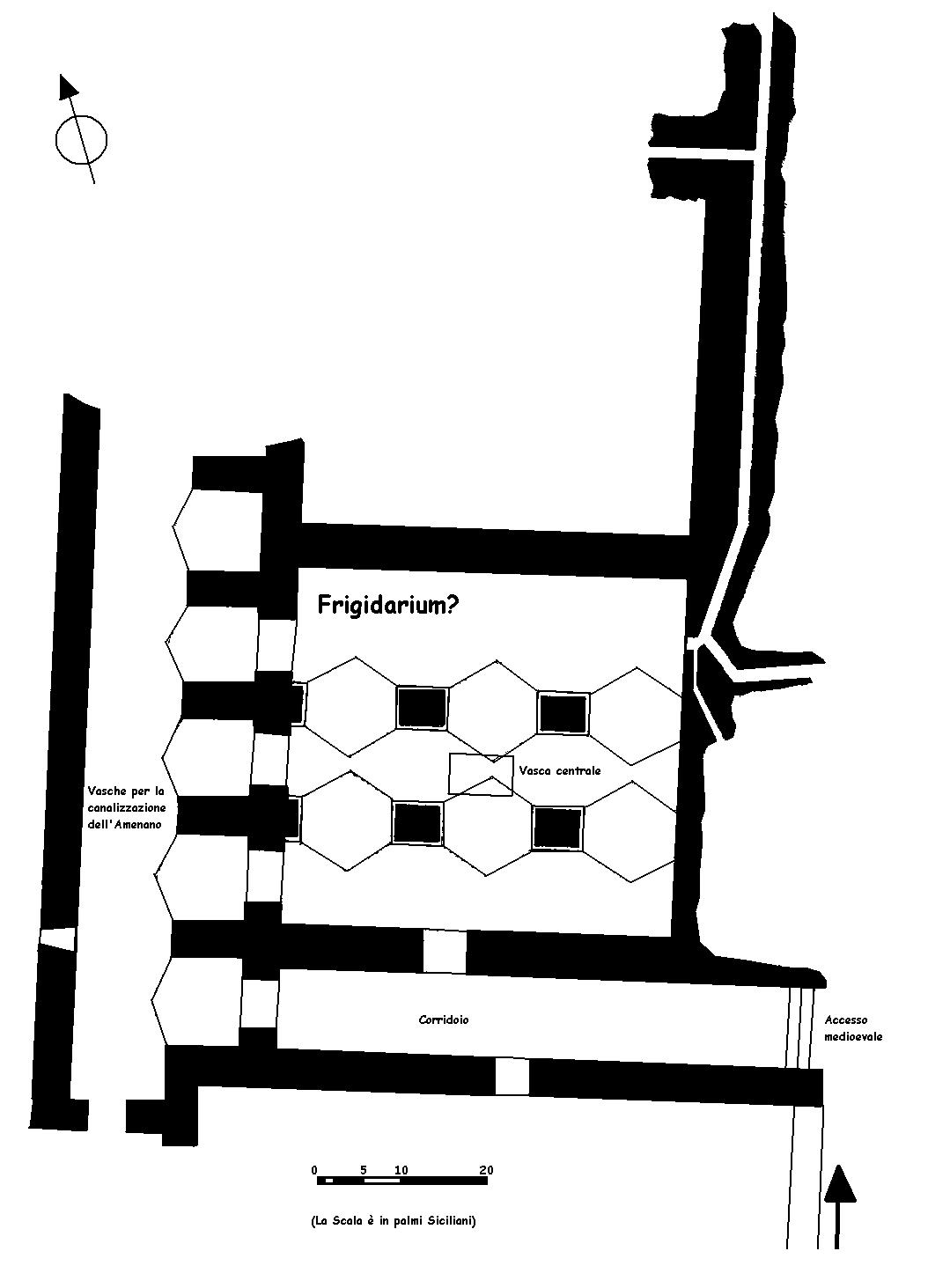
Plan of the Thermae Achillianae

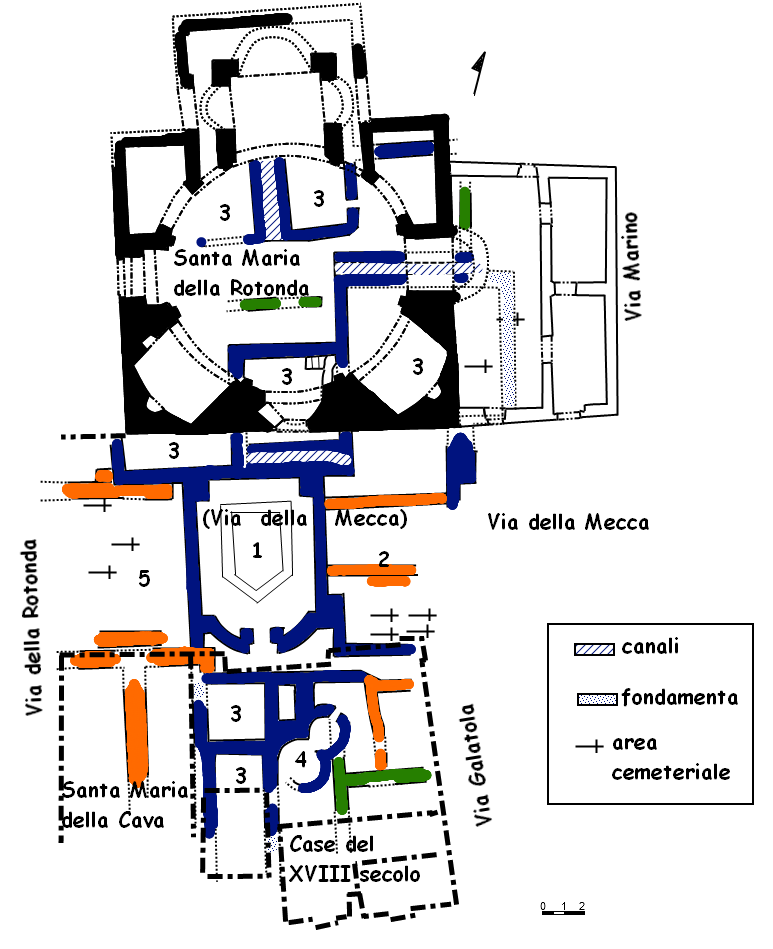
Plan of the Thermae of the Rotunda

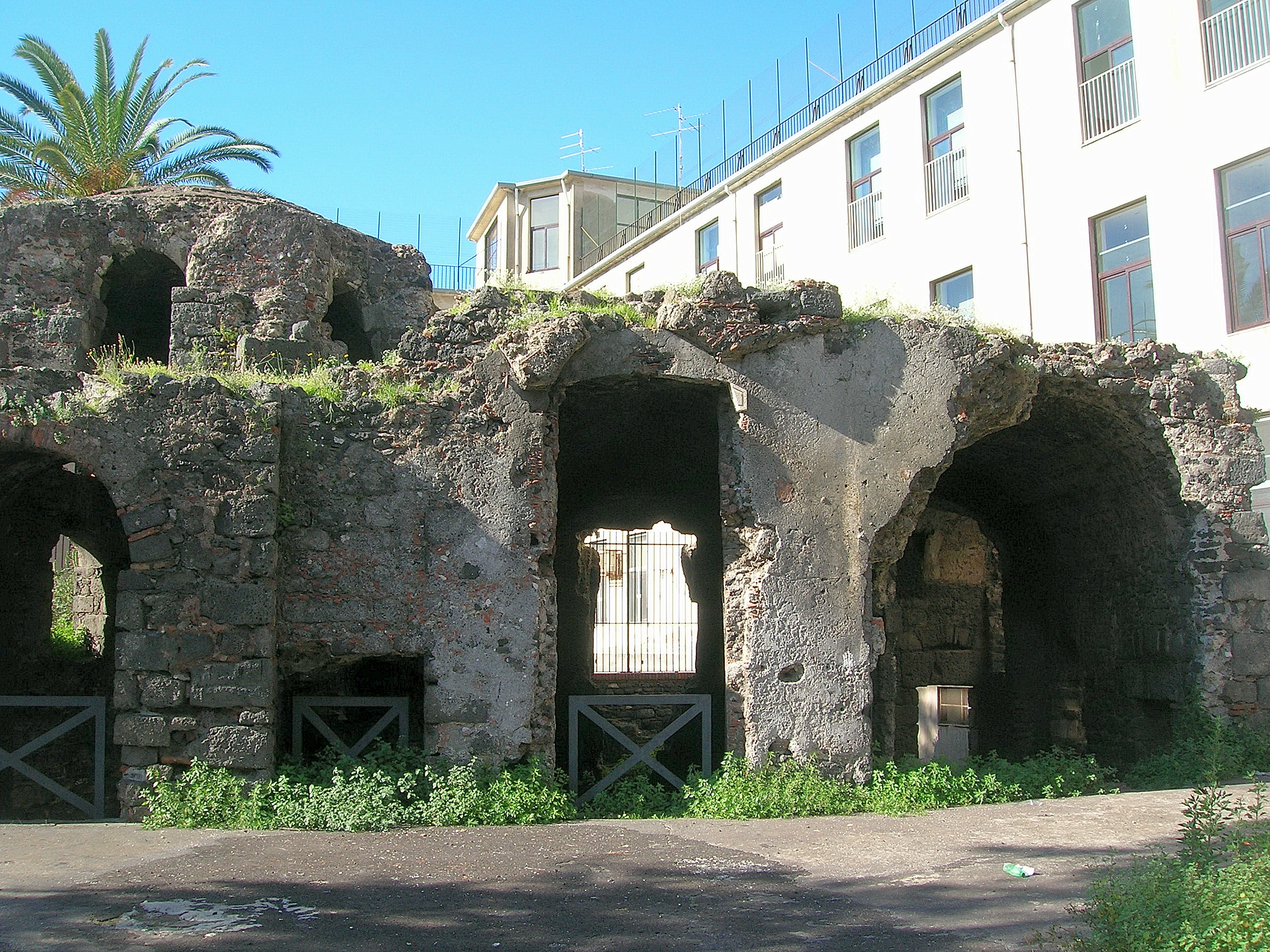
Thermae of Indirizzo

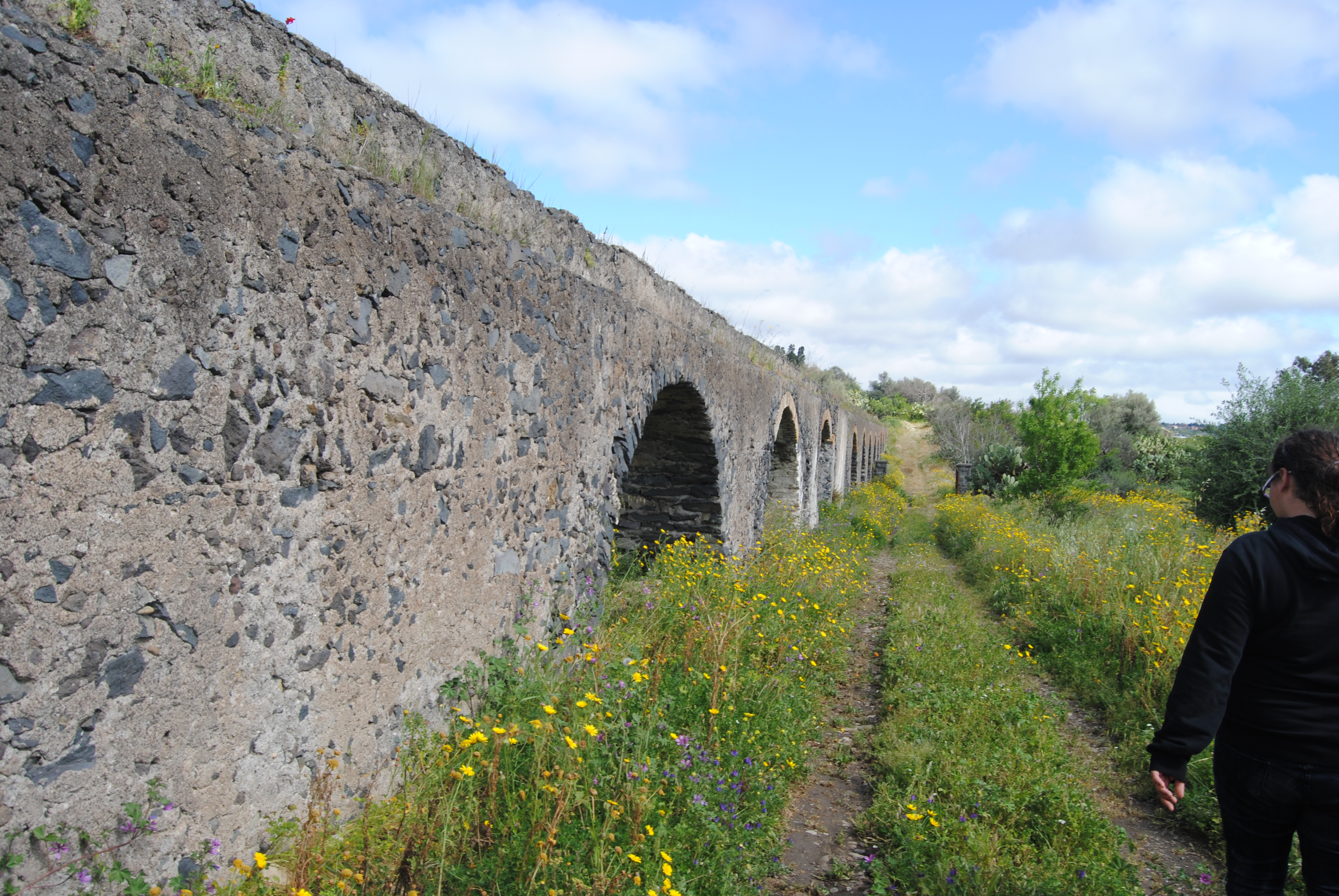
View of the Aqueduct at Valcorrente

=== Centuripe ===
Centuripe, surrendered spontaneously to the Roman consuls Lucius Valerius Flaccus and Titus Otacilius Crassus in 262 BC. As a result, the city was declared free and exempted from taxation, as Cicero mentions in his Verrine Orations. After this a spectacular pace of development is detectable which led it to become one of the most important cities in Roman Sicily. This is attested both by the statements of Cicero and archaeologically by the great quantity of pottery and the imposing funerary monuments. A Greek inscription from the 2nd century BC recounts a Centuripan diplomatic mission to Rome and Lanuvium and part of a treaty with Lanuvium by which the two communities were declared twins. In 39 BC, Sextus Pompey took the city by siege and destroyed it for its loyalty to Octavian, but the latter rebuilt it and gave the inhabitants Roman citizenship as well. In the Imperial period, Centuripe produced imposing monuments whose remains still survive today. These include the Temple of the Augustales of the first or second century AD, of which columns and two monumental tower tombs can be seen on one side; the Dogana, of which only a raised flat area can now be seen; and Castle of Conradin. In the northwest of the town, in contrada Bagni, a paved street leads to the remains of a nymphaeum, suspended over a torrent of water, of which a brick wall with five niches survives, as well as remains of a pool for collecting the water and part of the aqueduct. Notable also is the continued production of coinage by the city in the Roman Republican period.

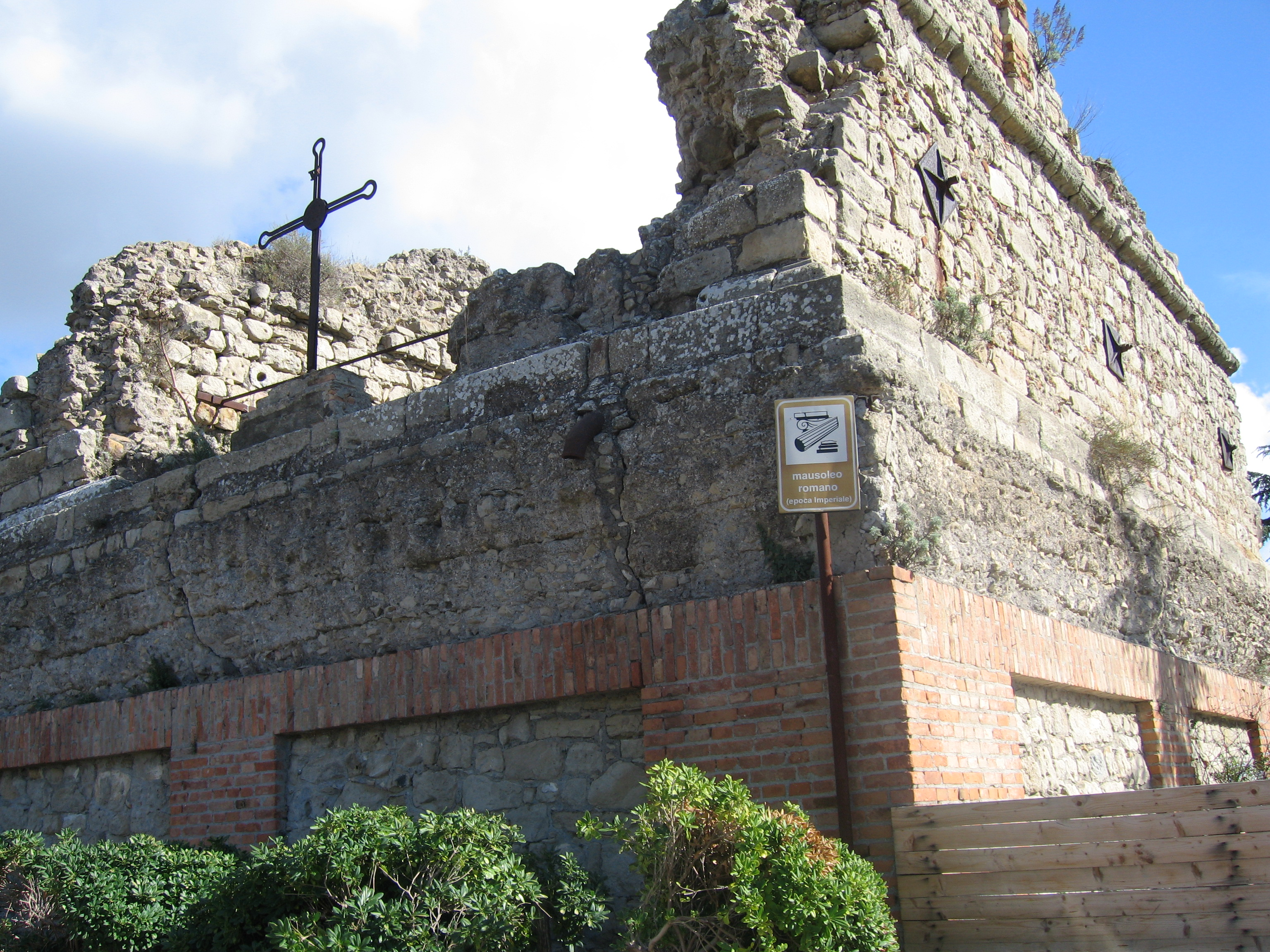
The Roman mausoleum near the Villa Comunale di Corradino (Centuripe)

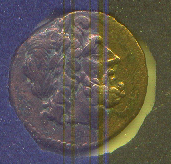
Coin of Centuripe, depicting Zeus, dating to 240 BC

=== Tauromenium ===
Tauromenium (Taormina) remained under the control of Syracuse until 212 BC when all of Sicily became a Roman province. Its inhabitants were considered foederati of the Romans and Cicero says in the Verrine Orations that it was one of three civitates foederatae (allied cities) and calls it a civis notabilis. As a result of this, the community did not have to pay the grain tax or provide ships and sailors in emergencies. In the course of the First Servile War (c.135–132 BC), Tauromenium was occupied by the rebel slaves who used it as a stronghold. Besieged by the consul Pompilius, the starving garrison surrendered only when one of the leaders, Serapion, betrayed his companions and admitted the Romans to the city. In 36 BC, during the war between Sextus Pompey and Octavian, the latter's troops disembarked at Naxos and reoccupied the city. Later, in 21 BC, Augustus founded a Roman colonia in the city for his supporters, expelling those inhabitants who had opposed him. Strabo speaks of Tauromenium as a smaller city than Messana and Catana. Pliny and Claudius Ptolemy mention it as a Roman colonia.

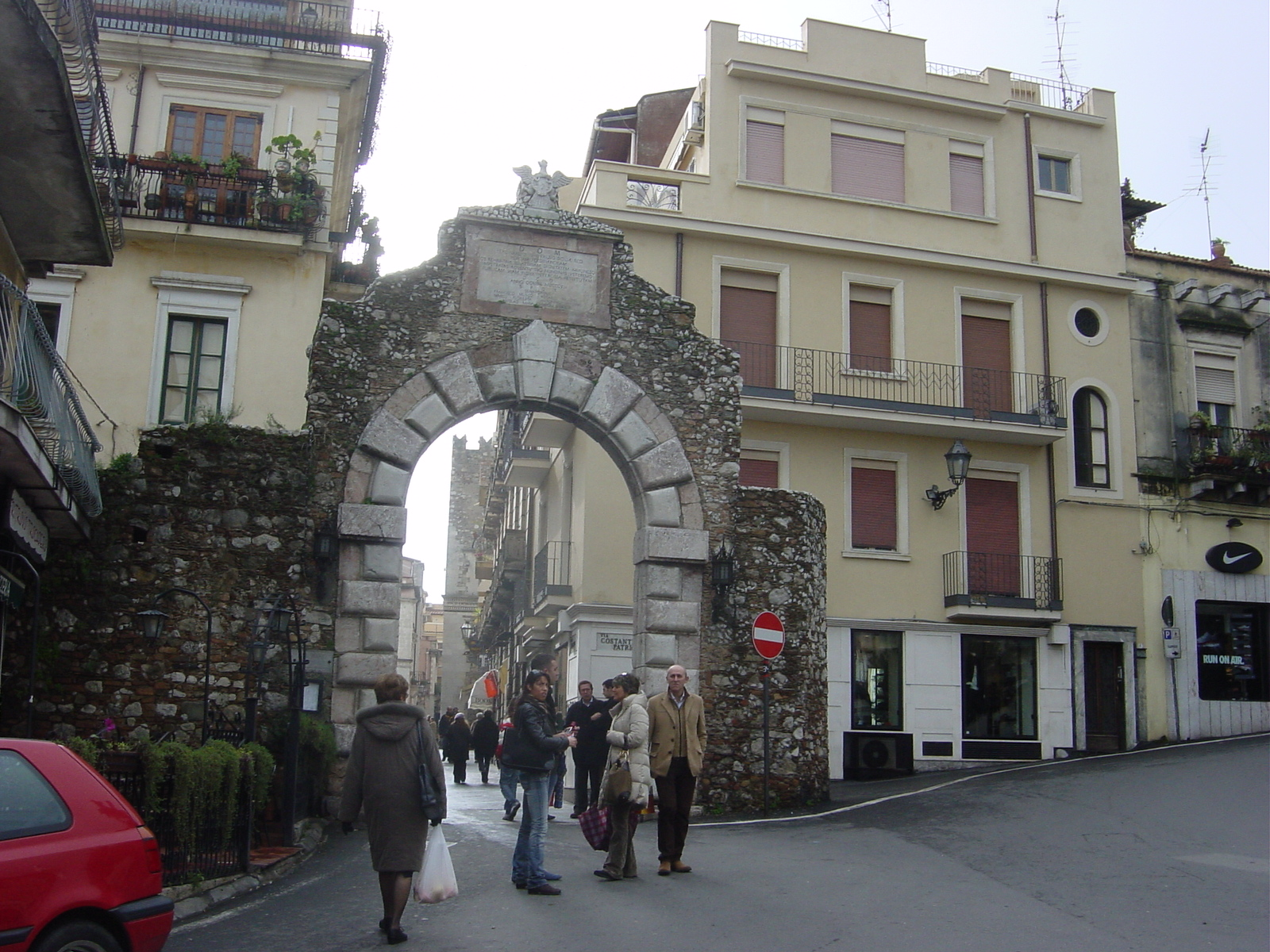
Roman Gate leading to Messina

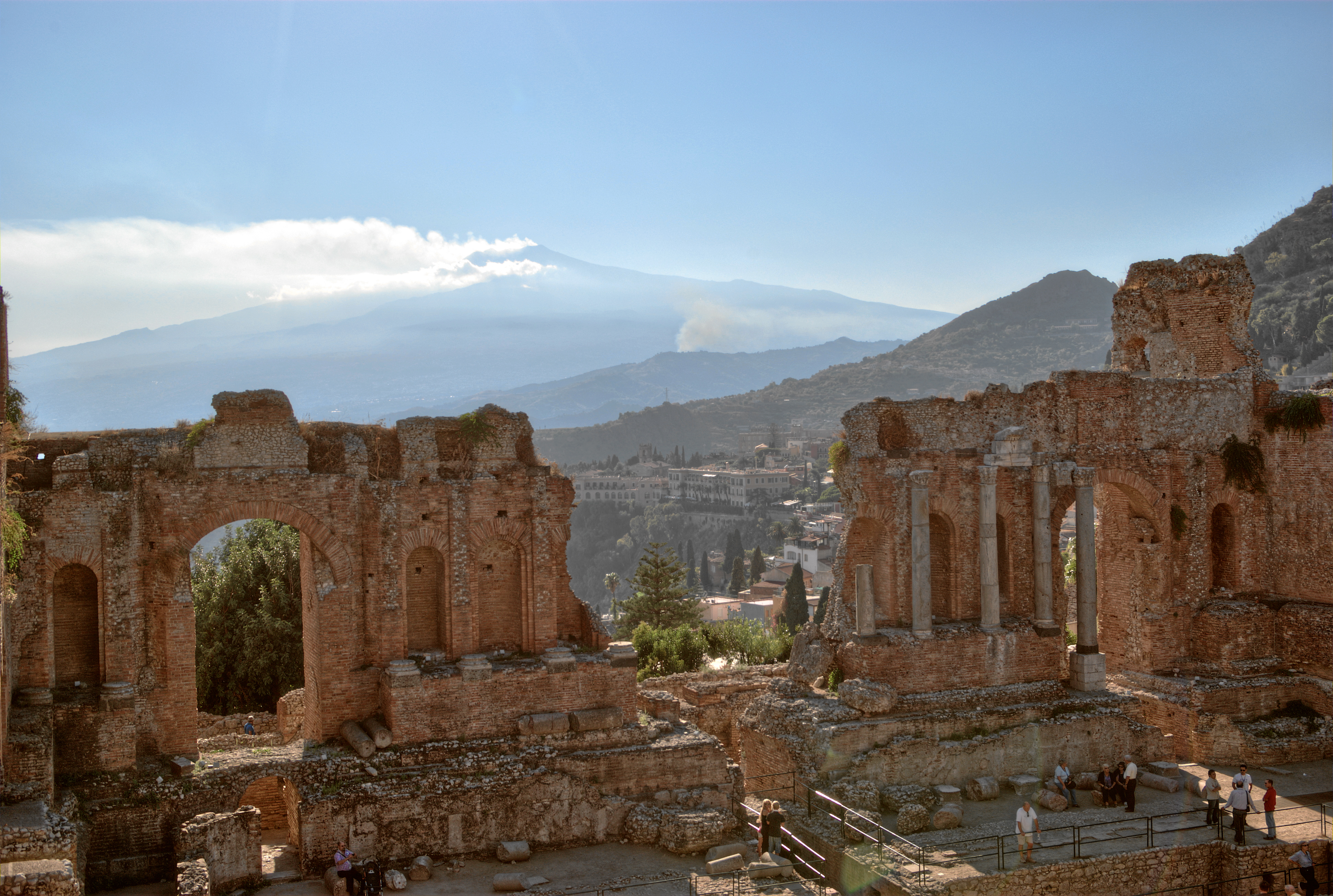
Greco-Roman theatre

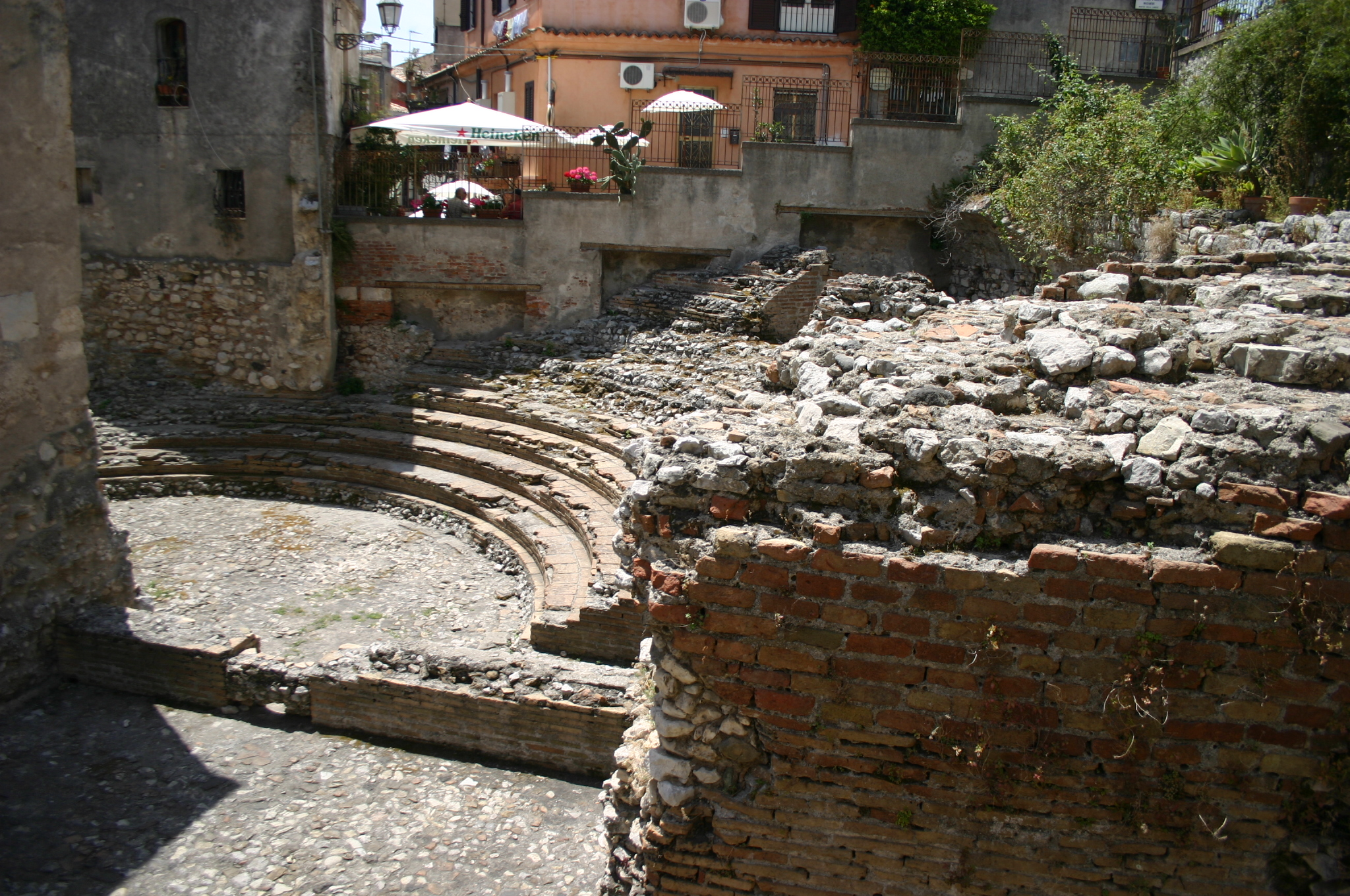
Roman odeon

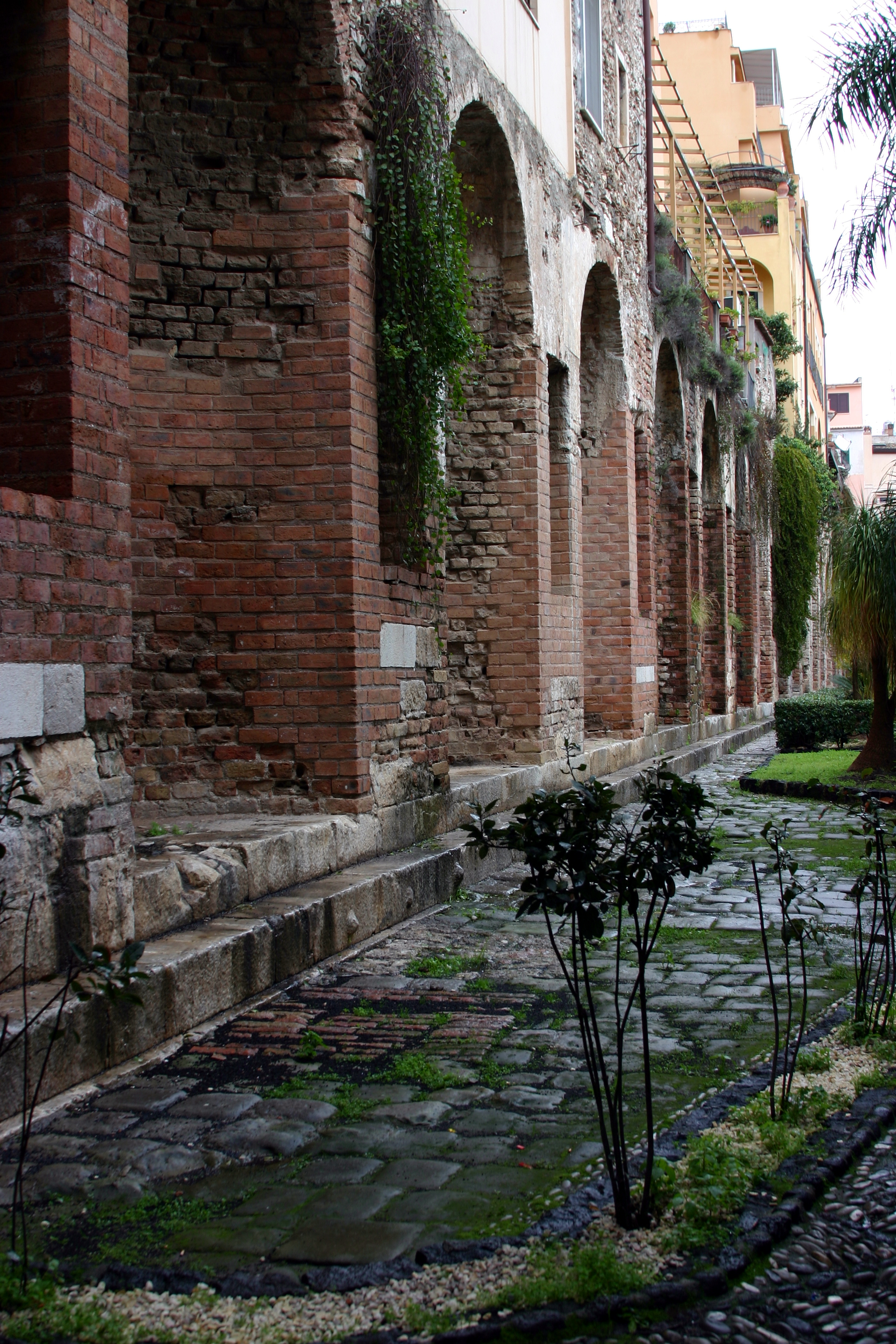
Naumachie

=== Messana ===
Messana (Messina) surrendered by the Mamertines to the Romans in 264 BC, received the status of civitas libera et foederata (free and allied community) after the First Punic War, along with Tauromenium. During the Republican period, it suffered attacks during the Servile Wars (102 BC). Cicero mentions the city in the Verrine Orations as civitas maxima et locupletissima (a very large and wealthy community). In 49 BC, Pompey attacked the fleet of Julius Caesar and drove it into Messana's port. Subsequently, the city became one of the many bases of Sextus Pompey and it was sacked by the troops of Lepidus. Afterwards, it probably became a municipium.

Of the fate of the city during the Roman Empire, we know almost nothing. There is a tradition that St Paul visited the city on his way to Rome and preached the Gospel there. After the division of the Roman Empire it became part of the Eastern empire. In 407, under the Emperor Arcadius, Messana was made the protometropolis of Sicily and Magna Graecia.

=== Tyndaris ===
Tyndaris (Tindari) was the control of Hieron II during the First Punic War and became a Carthaginian naval base early in the war. The Battle of Tyndaris was fought nearby in 257 BC, in which the Roman fleet commanded by Gaius Atilius Regulus defeated the Carthaginians. Later, it was a naval base for Sextus Pompey, captured by Octavian in 36 BC. He founded a Roman colonia, Colonia Augusta Tyndaritanorum, on the site, one of five coloniae founded in Sicily. Cicero calls the city a nobilissima civitas. In the first century AD it suffered a major landslide, while in the fourth century AD it was damaged by two destructive earthquakes. It became the seat of a bishopric, was conquered by the Byzantines in 535 and fell to the Arabs in 836, who destroyed the city.

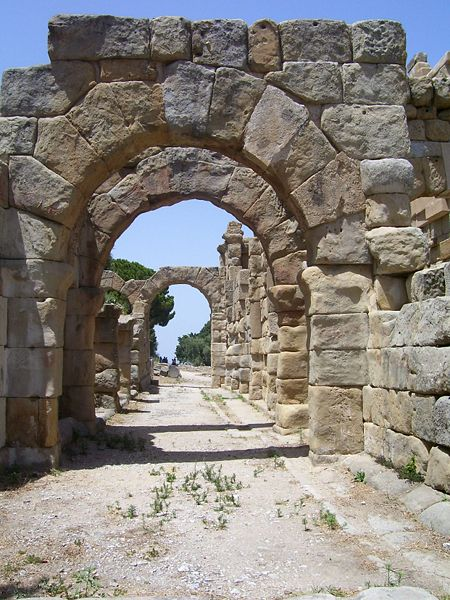
City wall

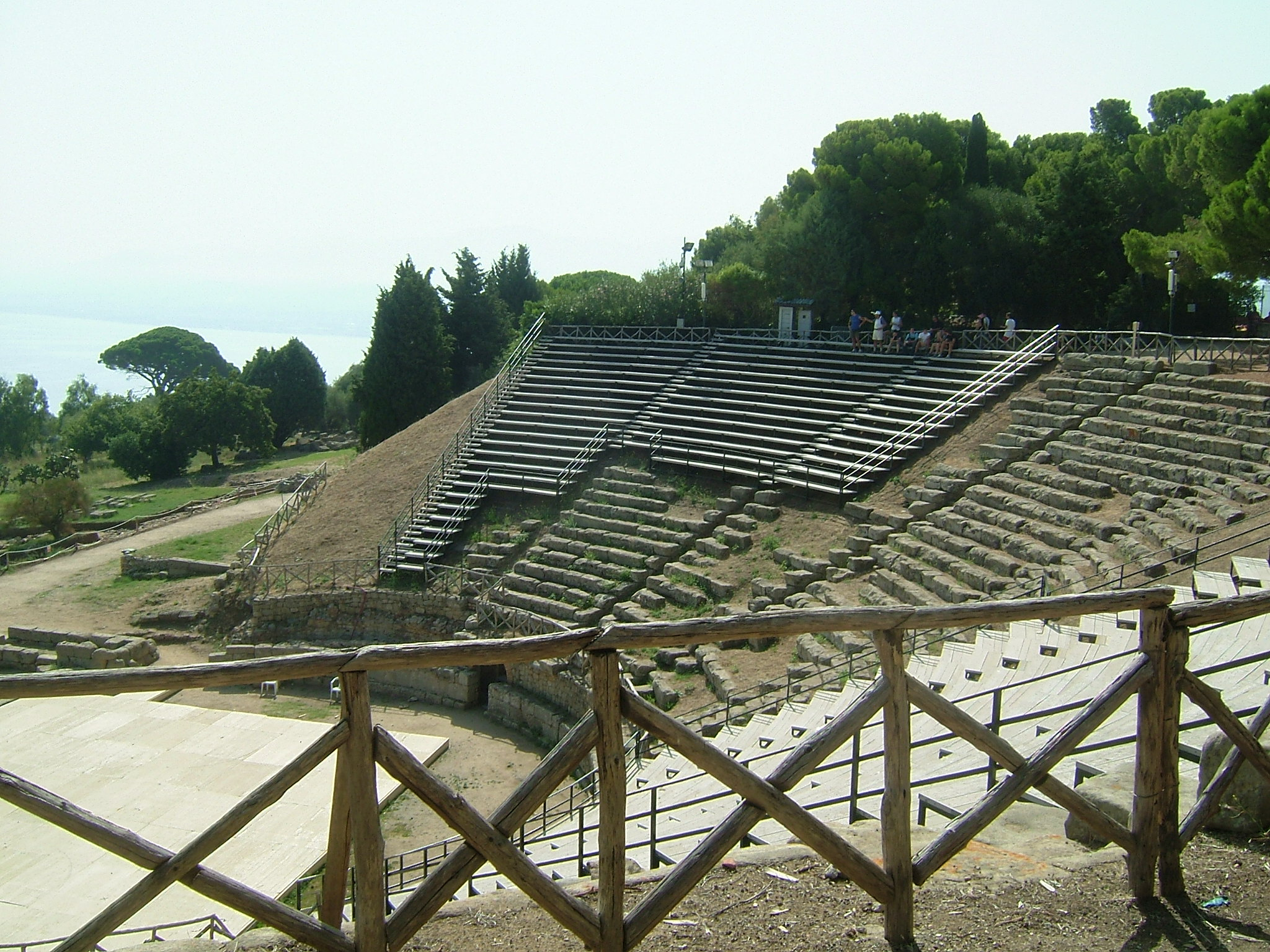
Greek theatre

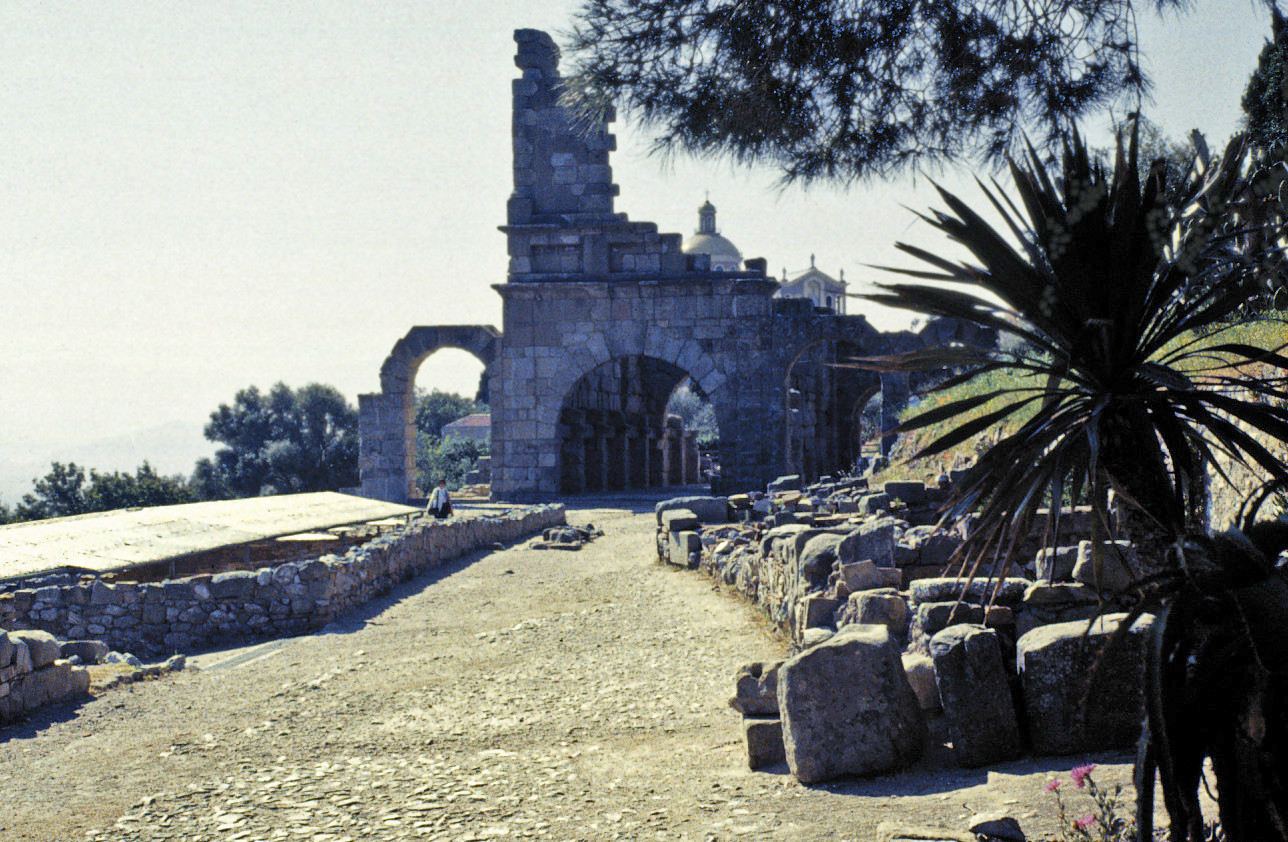
Roman basilica

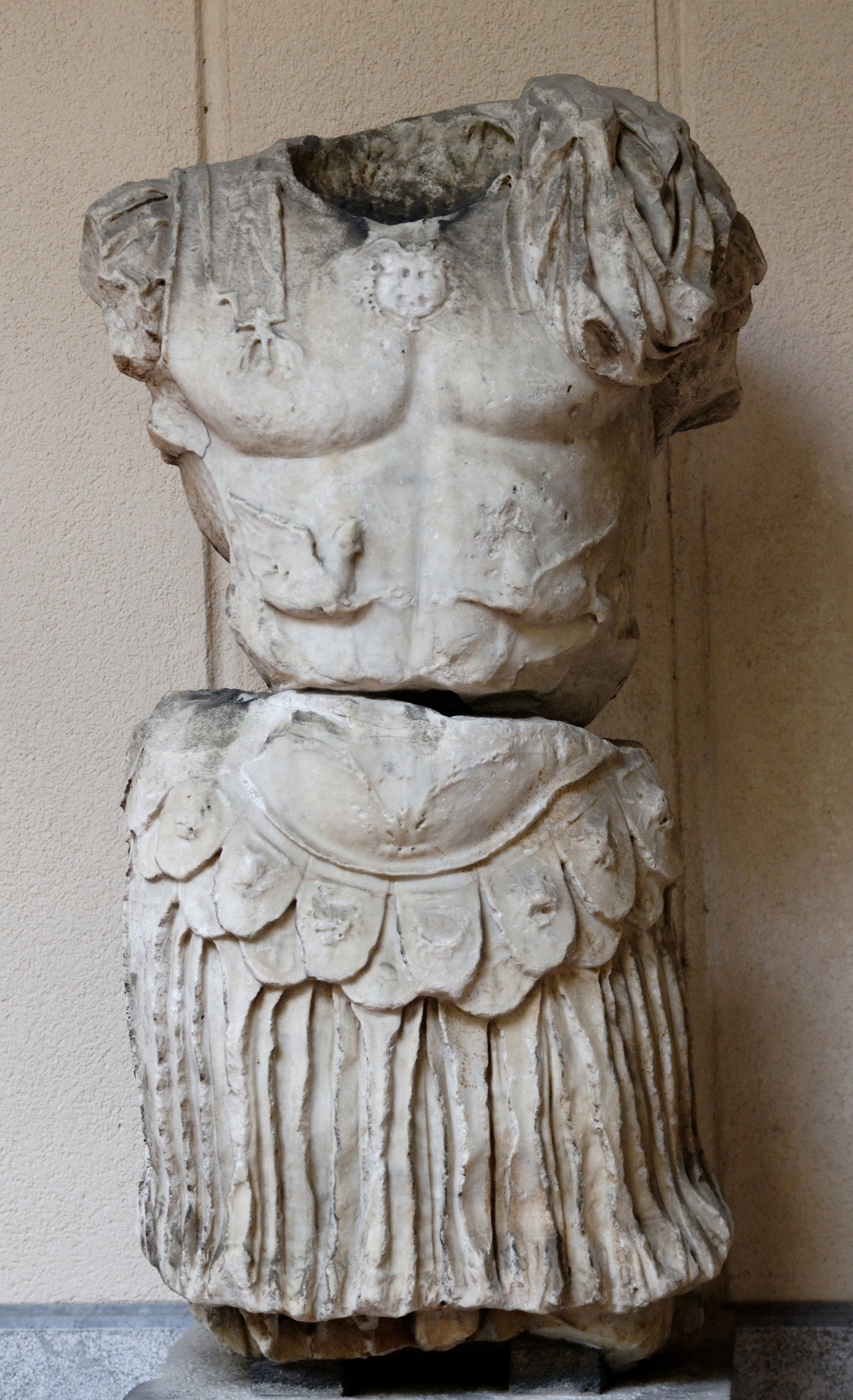
Male statue in a cuirass, reign of Trajan (Museo Archeologico Regionale Antonio Salinas)

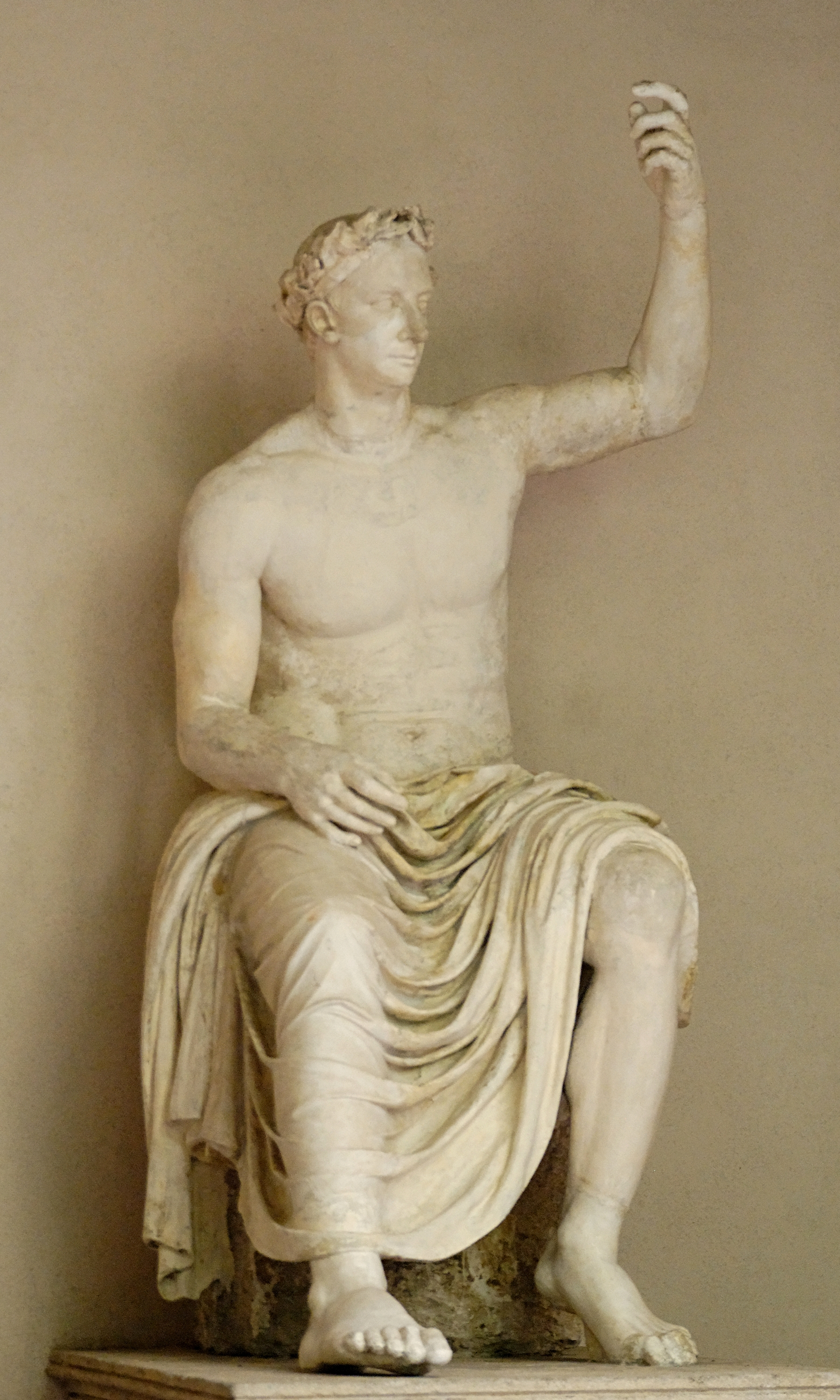
Statue of Claudius-Jupiter, from Tindari

=== Thermae Himerae ===
Thermae Himerae (Termini Imerese) was the site of a serious Roman defeat by Hamilcar Barca in 260 BC, during the First Punic War, but was subsequently conquered by them in 253 BC. Thereafter it remained loyal to Rome and was among the cities subject to tribute. After the destruction of Carthage in 146 BC Scipio Aemilianus returned works of art which had been taken by the Carthaginians to Thermae, including a statue of Stesichorus, who had spent time in the city. The base of one of these statues is preserved, with part of the inscription. After defeating Sextus Pompey, Octavian established a colonia on the site; this was probably a punishment of the city for having links with the Pompeian party. The impact of this action is clear from the numerous Latin inscriptions which survive at the site and from the extraordinary number of Roman and Italian names attested on the site. The former Greek inhabitants of the city practically disappear from record at the beginning of the Imperial period.

=== Panormus ===
Panormus (Palermo) remained under Carthaginian control until the First Punic War and was site of one of the main conflicts between the Carthaginians and the Romans, until the Roman fleet attacked the city in 254 BC and made the city a tributary. Hasdrubal attempted to recapture the city but was defeated by the Roman consul, Metellus. Another attempt at reconquest was made by Hamilcar Barca in 247 BC, but the city remained loyal to the Romans, for which it received the title of praetura, the eagle of gold, and the right to mint coinage, remaining one of the five free cities of the island.

=== Drepanum ===
Drepanum (Trapani), conquered along with Eryx at the end of the First Punic War, became a flourishing commercial city, owing primarily to the port, its geographic location on Mediterranean sea routes, its active sea salt industry, which had been developed already in Phoenician times, and the extraction of coral.

=== Lilybaeum ===
Lilybaeum (Marsala), already prosperous under the Carthaginians, was the seat of one of the quaestores which Rome sent to Sicily annually. It was enriched by splendid mansions and public buildings. Among others, one of the quaestores at Lilybaeum was Cicero in the year 75 BC, who referred to Lilybaeum as splendidissima civitas (the most splendid community). Under Emperor Pertinax, the city became a large Roman colonia, called Helvia Augusta Lilybaitanorum.

== See also ==
- History of Sicily
- List of Roman governors of Sicilia

== Bibliography ==
- Benigno, Francesco; Giarrizzo, Giuseppe (1999a). Storia della Sicilia. Vol. 1. Roma-Bari: Laterza Editore. ISBN 88-421-0533-3.
- Benigno, Francesco; Giarrizzo, Giuseppe (1999b). Storia della Sicilia. Vol. 2. Roma-Bari: Laterza Editore. ISBN 88-421-0534-1.
- Dreher, Martin (2010). La Sicilia antica. Bologna: il Mulino. ISBN 978-88-15-13824-8.
- Finley, Moses Israel (2009) [1970]. Storia della Sicilia antica (8 ed.). Roma-Bari: Editori Laterza. ISBN 978-88-420-2532-0.
- Geraci, Giovanni; Marcone, Arnaldo (2004). Storia romana. Firenze: Le Monnier. ISBN 88-00-86082-6.
- Guidetti, Massimo, ed. (2004). Storia del Mediterraneo nell'antichità. Editoriale Jaca Book. ISBN 9788816406605.
- Klug, Rebecca (2025). Ländliche Siedlungsstrategien im römischen Sizilien: neue Siedlungs- und Wirtschaftsformen jenseits der Städte [Rural settlement strategies in Roman Sicily: new forms of settlement and economy beyond the cities]. Rahden: Leidorf. ISBN 978-3-86757-516-4.
- Lyons, Claire L.; Bennett, Michael; Marconi, Clemente, eds. (2013). Sicily: Art and Invention between Greece and Rome. Getty Publications. ISBN 978-1-60606-133-6.
- Manganaro, Giacomo (1997) [1979]. "La provincia romana". In Romeo, Rosario (ed.). Storia della Sicilia. La Sicilia antica. Vol. 2 (2nd ed.). Roma: Editalia. pp. 309–363.
- Momigliano, Arnaldo; Woodhead, Arthur Geoffrey (1995). "Sicilia". In Hammond, Nicholas; Scullard, Howard (eds.). Dizionario di antichità classiche. Milano: Edizioni San Paolo. ISBN 88-215-3024-8.
- Rohlfs, Gerhard (1984). La Sicilia nei secoli. Profilo storico, etnico e linguistico. Palermo: Sellerio.
- Varvaro, Alberto (1981). Lingua e storia in Sicilia. Palermo: Sellerio.
- Ziółkowski, Adam (2006). Storia di Roma. Milano: Mondadori. ISBN 9788842497011.
