= Outside the Law =

Outside the Law may refer to:

- Outside the Law (1920 film), a 1920 American crime film by Tod Browning
- Outside the Law (1930 film), a remake of the 1920 film, also by Tod Browning
- Outside the Law (1937 film), an Argentine thriller film
- Outside the Law (1956 film), an American film noir crime film
- Outside the Law (2002 film), an American direct-to-video action film
- Outside the Law (2009 film), a documentary by Polly Nash and Andy Worthington
- Outside the Law (2010 film), a French dramatic film by Rachid Bouchareb

== See also ==
- Above the Law (disambiguation)
- Beyond the Law (disambiguation)
- Fuera de la ley (disambiguation) (English: "Outside the law")
