= Fuera de la ley =

Fuera de la ley (English: Outside the Law) may refer to:

- Outside the Law (1937 film), Argentine thriller film
- Fuera de la ley (1964 film), Argentine Western film

== See also ==
- Outside the Law (disambiguation)
