= Beyond the Law =

Beyond the Law may refer to:

- Beyond the Law (1918 film), an American western film directed by Theodore Marston
- Beyond the Law (1930 film), an American western film directed by J. P. McGowan
- Beyond the Law (1934 film), an American western film directed by D. Ross Lederman
- Beyond the Law (1968 American film), a police film by Norman Mailer
- Beyond the Law (1968 Italian film), a Spaghetti Western starring Lee Van Cleef
- Beyond the Law (1993 film), an American TV movie starring Charlie Sheen
- Beyond the Law (2019 film), an American action film directed by James Cullen Bressack
- Beyond the Law, a 1991 novel in the Hardy Boys Casefiles series

== See also ==
- Above the Law (disambiguation)
- Outside the Law (disambiguation)
