= Above the Law =

Above the Law may refer to:

== Movies and television ==
- Above the Law (1988 film), an American action film starring Steven Seagal
- Above the Law (2017 film), a Belgian-French thriller film starring Lubna Azabal
- Above the Law (TV series), an Australian television series
- Righting Wrongs, a 1986 Hong Kong action film titled Above the Law for international release, starring Cynthia Rothrock and Yuen Biao

== Legal concepts ==
- Immunity
- Impeachment
- Legibus solutus, doctrine of Roman Law as coined by Ulpian: "The sovereign is not bound by the laws." (Princeps legibus solutus est.)

== Other uses ==
- Above the Law (group), an American hip hop group
- Above the Law (website), a law blog
- "Above the Law", a song by Bad Meets Evil from Hell: The Sequel
- "Above the Law", the third episode of the adventure video game The Walking Dead: A New Frontier

== See also ==
- Beyond the Law (disambiguation)
- Outside the Law (disambiguation)
