= Lex =

Lex or LEX may refer to:

== Computing ==
- Amazon Lex, a service for building conversational interfaces into any application using voice and text
- LEX (cipher), a stream cipher based on the round transformation of AES
- Lex (software), a computer program that generates lexical analyzers
- lex (URN), a URN namespace that allows accurate identification of laws and other legal norms

== Music ==
- L.E.X., the third studio album by Liverpool Express
- "Lex", a song from Ratatat's 2006 album Classics
- Lex (album), a mini-album and partial soundtrack by Portland, Oregon duo Visible Cloaks
- Lex Records, an independent record label

== People and fictional characters ==
- Lex (given name)
- Lex (surname)
- Lex Luger, ring name of American professional wrestler Lawrence Pfohl (born 1958)
- Lex Luger (record producer), American record producer (born 1991)
- Lex Steele, stage name of American pornographic actor Clifton Britt (born 1969)
- Lex Land, stage name of American singer-songwriter Alexa Holland
- Lex Luthor, a supervillain from DC Comics
- Lex Lucifer, leader of the band The Blue Scream, in Scout

== Places ==
- Lex, West Virginia, an unincorporated community
- Lexington Avenue, a street in Manhattan in New York City

== Codes ==
- LEX, IATA code for Blue Grass Airport, a public airport in Fayette County, Kentucky, United States
- lex, ISO 639-3 code for the Luang language, spoken in Indonesia

== Other uses ==
- Lex, the Latin word for law, plural leges; see list of Roman laws for specific laws beginning with lex, such as lex Vatinia
- USS Lexington (CV-2), a United States Navy aircraft carrier
- Lex (dog) (1999–2012), the first active duty, fully fit military working dog to be granted early retirement in order to be adopted
- LEX (sounding rocket), a French experimental hybrid-propellant sounding rocket
- Lex Autolease, the United Kingdom's largest vehicle leasing business
- Lex building, a high-rise of government offices in the European Quarter of Brussels
- Lex, a daily featured column in the Financial Times
- Lex XI F.C., a Welsh football team based in Wrexham
- Leading-edge extension, a small extension to an aircraft wing surface
- Severe Tropical Storm Lex, a category-1 typhoon in the 1983 Pacific typhoon season
- Lex, the mascot of the word-forming puzzle video game Bookworm
  - Same character in the follow-up game Bookworm Adventures
- Lex (app), an LGBTQ+ dating and social app
- Lex – Danmarks Nationalleksikon, online National Encyclopedia of Denmark
- LEX 18, branding of NBC affiliate WLEX-TV in Lexington, Kentucky
- LEX 36, branding of ABC affiliate WTVQ-DT in Lexington, Kentucky

== See also ==
- Leges (disambiguation)
- Lexx, a science fiction television series
