= Leges provinciae =

Set of laws administrating Roman provinces

The leges provinciae were sets of laws first enacted in 146 BC designed to aid in the regulation and administration of the Roman provinces. Written specifically for each province, the leges provinciae was drafted by the victorious general with the help of a commission of ten legati, or advisors, who were usually of senatorial rank. Then the charter was enacted, provided it was approved by the Senate.

== History ==
Provincial administration before 146 BC was achieved in essentially the same manner as it was after the advent of the leges provinciae. In 167 BC, for example, Lucius Aemilius Paulus imposed an extensive settlement on Macedonia. Paulus and his commission divided Macedonia into four independent republics; and they wrote laws for each region, including the amount of tribute to be paid to Rome. Settlements prior to 146 BC, including Paulus' settlement of Macedonia, were informal. The leges, or lex provinciae originated in 146 BC after Scipio Aemilianus' settlement of Africa. Like previous provincial organization, Africa was settled without a formal charter^{3}. Later that year, however, the senate seems to have passed the leges provinciae, which created formal constitutions for the provinces and set a precedent for future conquests^{5}. Examples include Publius Rupilius' Lex Rupilia for Sicily in 132 BC and Pompeius Magnus' Lex Pompeia for Bithynia^{1}. Lex provinciae and leges provinciae were used interchangeably over the course of Roman history.

Although drafting formal constitutions for provinces became more common after the advent of the leges provinciae, having a leges provinciae was not a necessary condition for the Romans exercising direct rule. Several territories settled after 146. BC had provincial status without a leges provinciae. For example, parts of Germania seem to have been subject to paying tribute without a formal charter^{3}.

== Provisions ==
The leges provinciae had four main objectives: I) it divided the province into regions, II) it made arrangements for taxes and marked out tax districts, III) it divided the province into conventus for judicial purposes, and IV) it defined the relationships between the senate, magistrates, and popular assemblies^{1}.

The main objective of the leges provinciae was to formalize the conquered territory's status as a province and to exact tribute from it. The leges provinciae were not detailed constitutions designed to resolve everyday affairs. Rather, they were basic charters or formulas which organized the territory and specified certain basic regulations. The day-to-day administration of the province was done by a combination of magistrates and senatorial commissions. The governor of the province had autonomous power and was free to enact edicts so long as they complied with the leges provinciae^{4}. The leges provinciae determined the extent of the governor's power in the sense that it limited the kinds of cases that the governor could hear^{2}.

== See also ==
- Roman Law
- List of Roman laws
- Ancient Rome
- Civitas foederata
- Civitas libera
- Civitas stipendaria
