= Publius Mucius Scaevola =

Publius Mucius Scaevola may refer to:

- Publius Mucius Scaevola (consul 175 BC) (fl. 179–169 BC), received a triumph over the Ligurians
- Publius Mucius Scaevola (consul 133 BC) (c. 176 BC – 115 BC), son of the above, a noted jurist and pontifex maximus

== See also ==
- Mucius Scaevola (disambiguation)
