= Heraclea Minoa =

Ancient Greek city

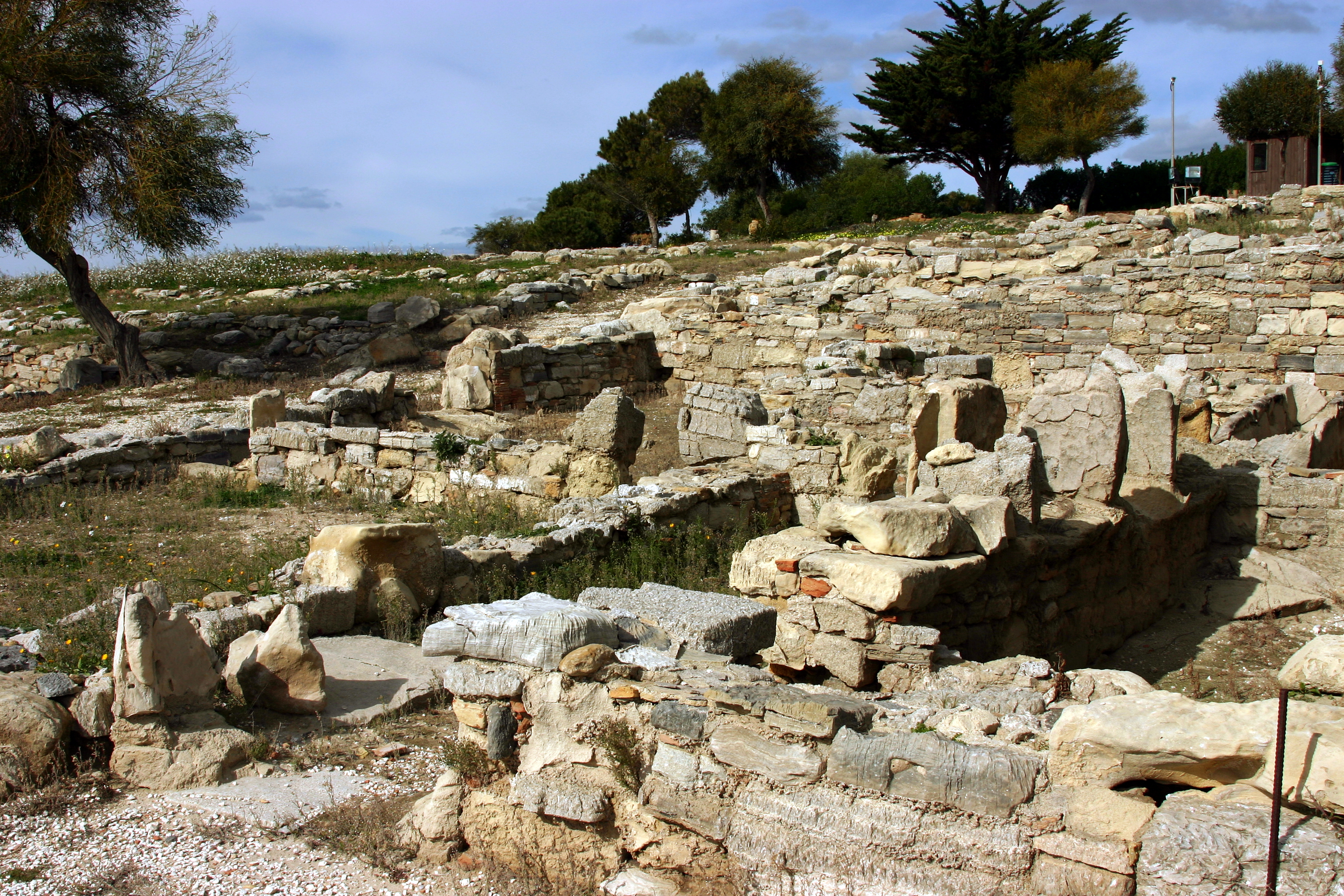
- The remains of a house in Heraclea Minoa

- Location within Sicily
- 37°23′38″N 13°16′51″E
- Type: Settlement
- Periods: Archaic Greek to Roman Imperial
- Cultures: Greek, Roman
- Location: Cattolica Eraclea, Province of Agrigento, Sicily, Italy

History
- Built: Middle of the 6th century BC

Site notes
- Condition: Ruined
- Website: Area Archeologia e Antiquarium Eraclea Minoa (in Italian)

Heraclea Minoa (Ancient Greek: Ἡράκλεια Μινῴα, Hērákleia Minṓia; Italian: Eraclea Minoa) was an ancient Greek city of Magna Graecia situated on the southern coast of Sicily near the mouth of the river Halycus (modern Platani), 25 km west of Agrigentum (Acragas, modern Agrigento). It is located near the modern town of the same name in the comune Cattolica Eraclea in Italy.

Excavations have revealed several parts of the city which are now open to the public.

Archaeology has shown that the city was founded in the middle of the 6th century BC as an outpost of the Greek colony of Selinus (modern Selinunte) and was finally abandoned around the beginning of the 1st century AD.

== Site ==
The city is situated a few hundred metres southeast of the mouth of the river Platani (the ancient Halycus) in a defendable position atop the conspicuous promontory now called Capo Bianco with gently sloping sides down to the Platani valley to the north and sheer white cliffs to the ocean on the south side. The Heraclean promontory is mentioned by Strabo in his description of the coasts of Sicily, and which he correctly gives as 20 miles distant from the port of Agrigentum.

== History ==
=== Two Myths ===
Its two names were connected with separate myths regarding its origin. The first of these was that Heracles, having vanquished the local hero Eryx in a wrestling match, obtained thereby the right to the whole western portion of Sicily, which he expressly reserved for his descendants.

The other was that somewhat later, Minos, king of Crete, having come to Sicily in pursuit of Daedalus, landed at the mouth of the river Halycus, and founded there a city, to which he gave the name of Minoa; or, according to another version of the story, the city was first established by his followers, after the death of Minos himself. Heraclides Ponticus adds that there was previously a native city on the spot, the name of which was Macara. No intimation is given by Diodorus of the names relating to the same spot.

=== 6th century BC ===
Archaeological finds from the necropolis show the city was founded in the mid-6th century BC. The first written mention of the city is of a small town and a colony of the Greek settlement of Selinus (itself founded about 650 BC), bearing the name of Minoa. From its founding Minoa was in contention between Selinus (as its eastern outpost) and Akragas which wanted control of the Platani valley.

In c. 510 BC Dorieus the Spartan (brother of Cleomenes I) came to Sicily with the intent of reclaiming the territory which he believed had belonged to his ancestor Heracles. But in fighting the Carthaginians and Segestans, he was defeated and slain and almost all his leading companions also perished. Euryleon, the only one of the chiefs who escaped, made himself master of Minoa which now, in all probability, obtained for the first time the name of Heraclea.

From the time of this new settlement it seems to have borne the name of Heraclea, though coupled with that of Minoa for the sake of distinction.

=== 5th–4th century BC ===
The city was only briefly under the control of the Spartans and during the whole of the 5th c. BC it was under Akragan control and became very prosperous.

However it was destroyed by the Carthaginians probably in 406 BC, through jealousy of its increasing power. When this took place is uncertain; it was probably in the 10th book of Diodorus, now lost. He makes no mention of any such event during the First Sicilian War (480 BC) when it might otherwise be supposed to have occurred. An inscription from the temple of Athena Lindia of Lindos on Rhodes attests the dedication of an ivory palladium as spoils from an undated victory of the Agrigentines over Minoa.

The territory of Heraclea Minoa fell under Carthaginian control as a result of the treaty of 405 BC. but the absence of all mention of Heraclea suggests that either it did not then exist or must have been in a very reduced condition.

It was won back in 397 BC by Dionysius in his first Punic war, but recovered by Carthage in 383 BC.

The next mention of it (under the name of Minoa), when Dion landed there in 357 BC when he attacked Syracuse, is as a small town in Agrigentine territory, but still subject to Carthage. Hence it is probable that the treaty between Dionysius and the Carthaginians which had fixed the Halycus as the boundary of the latter, had left Heraclea, though on its southeast bank, still in their hands:

It was included in the similar treaty of 314 BC between the Carthaginians and Agathocles of Syracuse in that Heraclea, Selinus, and Himera should continue to be subject to Carthage as before.

From this time Heraclea reappears in history, and assumes the position of an important city; though there is no known reason for its resurgence. It joined in the movement originated by Xenodicus of Agrigentum in 309 BC and declared itself free both from the Carthaginians and Agathocles, though it was soon recovered by Agathocles on his return from Africa in 305 BC.

=== 3rd century BC ===
In 278 BC during the expedition of Pyrrhus, it had been in the hands of the Carthaginians and was the first city taken from him as he advanced westward from Agrigentum. In 260 BC in the First Punic War it was occupied by the Carthaginian general Hanno when advancing to the relief of Agrigentum, at that time besieged by the Roman armies.

Again, in 256 BC, it was at Heraclea that the Carthaginian fleet of 350 ships was posted to prevent the passage of the Roman fleet to Africa and where it sustained a great defeat by the Roman consuls Regulus and Manlius. It appears at this time to have been one of the principal naval stations of the Carthaginians in Sicily and in 249 BC their admiral, Carthalo, took his post there to watch for the Roman fleet which was approaching to the relief of Lilybaeum.

At the close of the war Heraclea passed, with the rest of Sicily, under the Roman dominion; but in the Second Punic War it again fell into the hands of the Carthaginians, and was one of the last places that still held out against Marcellus, even after the fall of Syracuse.

=== Roman period ===
Little of it is recorded under Roman dominion, but it appears to have suffered severely in the First Servile War (134–132 BC) and in consequence received a body of fresh colonists, who were established there by the praetor Publius Rupilius. At the same time the relations of the old and new citizens were regulated by a municipal law, which still subsisted in the time of Cicero, when Heraclea was still flourishing. Soon afterwards it must have fallen into decay, in common with most of the towns on the southern coast of Sicily.

Archaeology shows that towards the end of the first century BC the city was abandoned.

It is not mentioned by Pliny. However it is one of three south coastal Sicilian cities briefly mentioned by the 1st century AD Roman geographer Mela and also by the 2nd century AD Greek geographer Ptolemy. The latter author is the last who mentions the name of Heraclea; it appears to have certainly disappeared before the age of the Roman Itineraries.

The urban area outside the wall was occupied in the III-VII c. AD by a late Roman villa, and in the Byzantine period with the construction of a large basilica and a connected cemetery.

== Archaeology ==
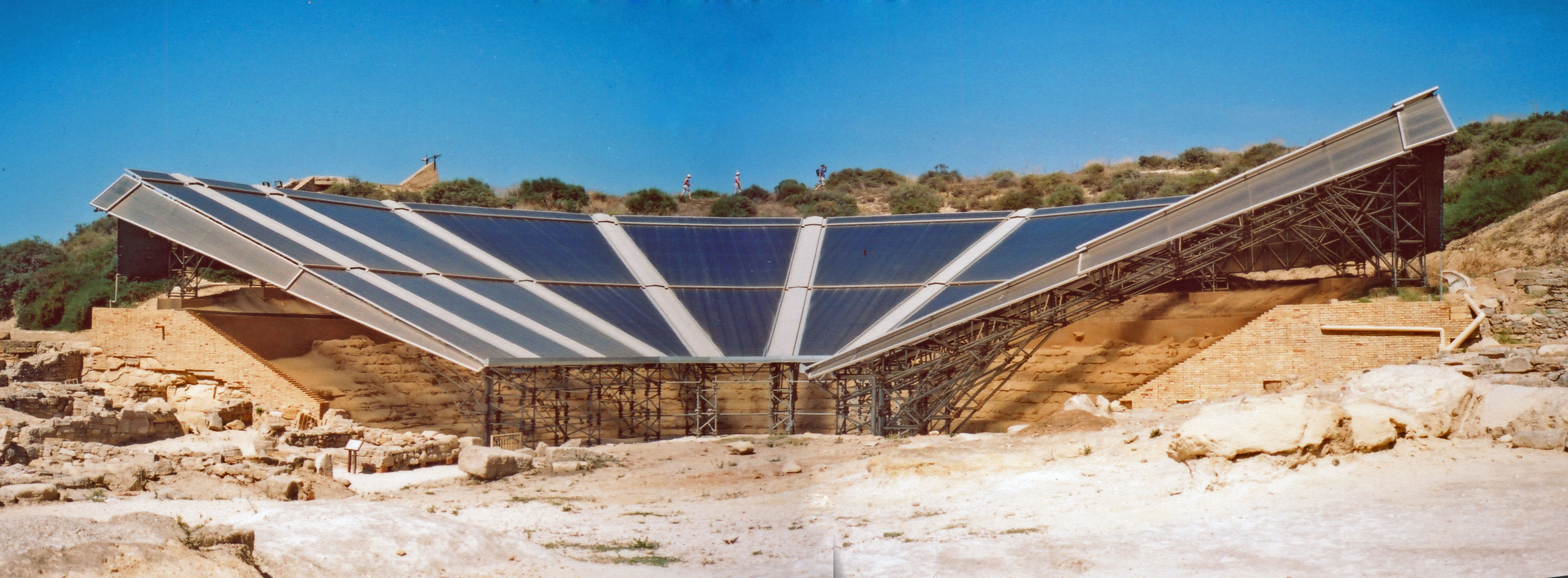
The theatre

The location of Heraclea Minoa was first identified by the 16th century historian Tommaso Fazello; the foundations of the walls could be distinctly traced and, though no ruins remained standing, the whole site abounded with remains of pottery and brickwork. According to Fazello an aqueduct was then also still visible between the city and the mouth of the river but its remains have since disappeared, though the height difference makes this unlikely to be practible.

In the early 20th century, a mid-6th-early 5th century BC necropolis was discovered. A large-scale excavation by Professor Ernesto de Miro from 1950 uncovered late 4th–late 1st century BC dwellings and the late 4th century BC theatre. The absence of Arretine ware at the site strongly suggests that the city was abandoned by the beginning of the 1st century AD. Many cemeteries and tombs have been excavated in the nearby countryside and many of their grave goods are on display in the on-site museum.

=== The theatre ===
The theatre was built in the 4th-3rd c. BC into the hollow of a small hill with, unusually, the cavea facing south against the advice of Vitruvius. The side of the theatre is built onto the city walls. The sides of the auditorium are prolonged like a few other Greek theatres (e.g. Segeste, Athens).

It did not have a real stage as in the orchestra the fixings for cables of a mobile wooden podium were found. The theatre was abandoned in the 2nd-1st c. BC when other buildings used the walls of the staircases.

The soft building stone, as used throughout the city, has mandated a modern roof to protect the theatre from further erosion.

=== Houses ===
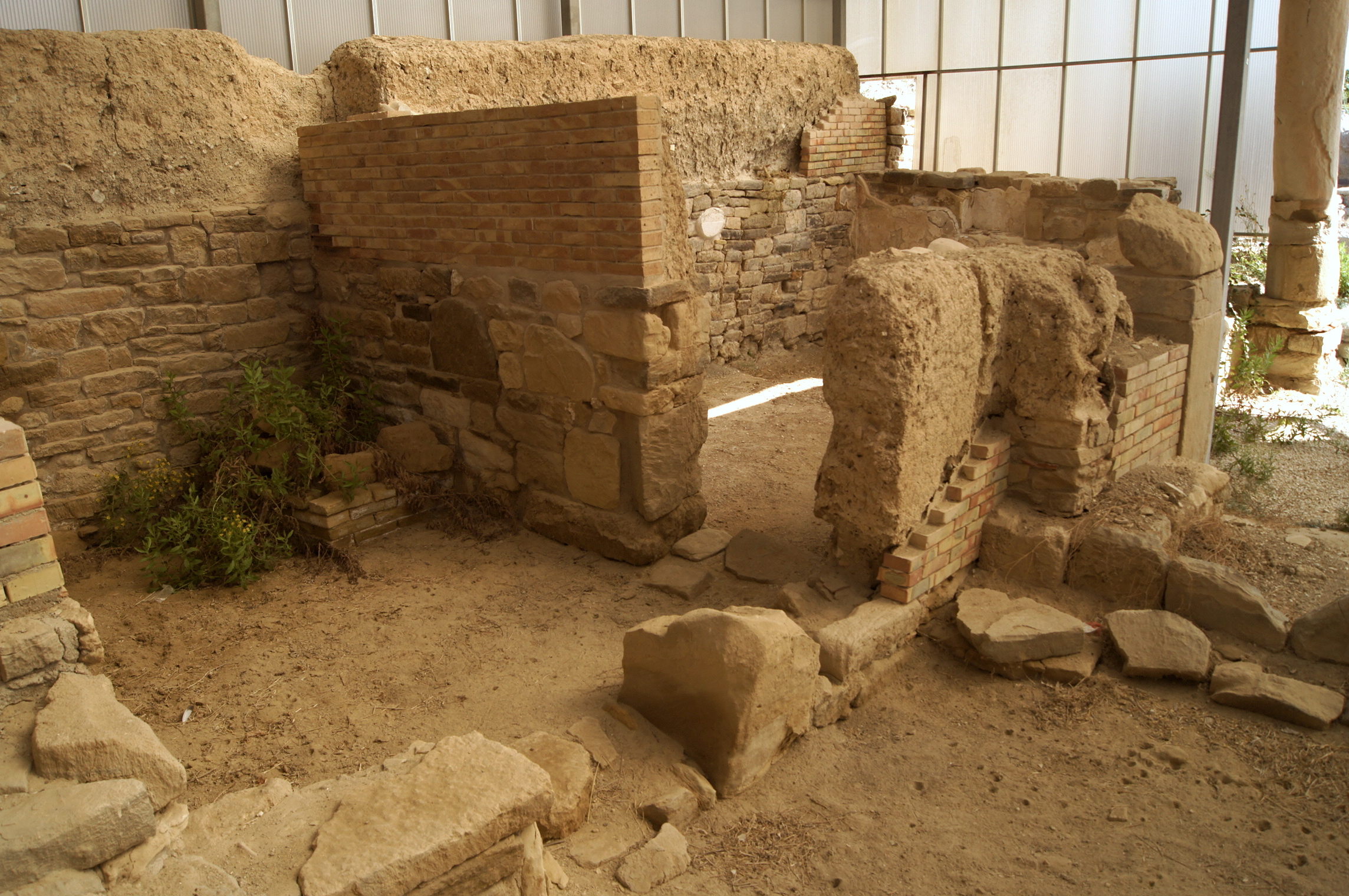
Heraclea House A showing mud brick upper walls

The oldest IV-III c. BC settlement is visible at present through two completely excavated houses: A and B.

House A had a courtyard (atrium) equipped with a large cistern into which water from the compluvium pitched roofs drained. North of the courtyard was a domestic shrine (lararium) of which the quadrangular altar leaning against the northwest corner and the shrine for the lares in the east wall are preserved. The floor of the room is in cocciopesto decorated with white pieces while the walls retain remnants of the stucco decoration (Pompeian 1st style).

House B had an upper floor whose rubble (unbaked bricks of the walls, threshold slabs, stuccos, plasters, decorated cocciopesto floor and mosaic) filled the rooms on the ground floor during their collapse. The state of preservation of the walls is exceptional, not only of the lower stone part but also of the higher mud bricks. The walls were plastered and painted.

The older settlement was overbuilt in the II-I c. BC by that identified with the repopulation of the colony at the end of the First Servile War in 132 BC. The organisation of the city with a grid of insulae framed by north–south and east–west roads follows the pattern of the previous phase. The houses typically consist of two or more rooms surrounding a courtyard with a hearth. The house walls are built on a base of chalk stone blocks with mud bricks above.

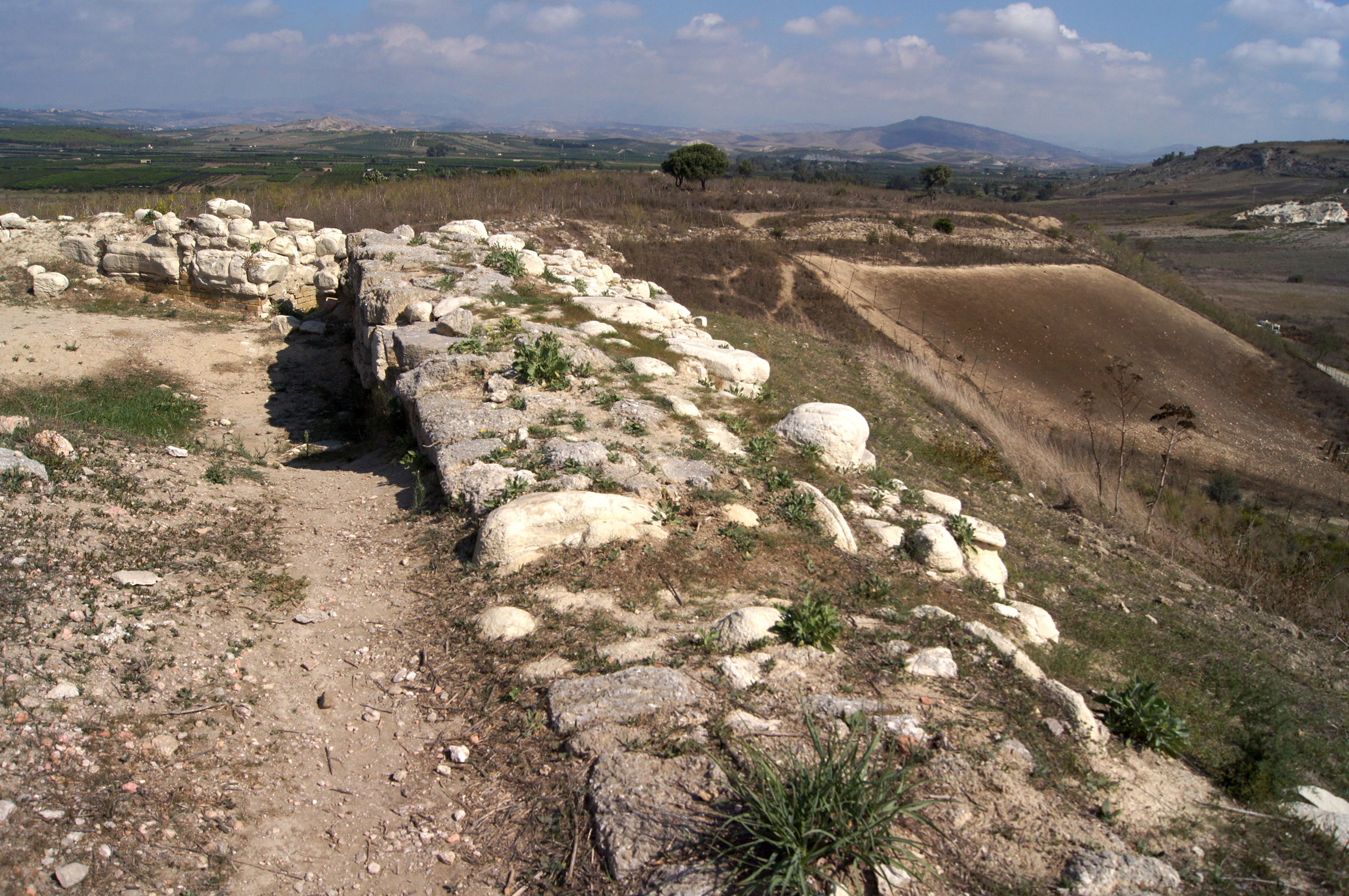
City walls NE sector

=== City walls ===
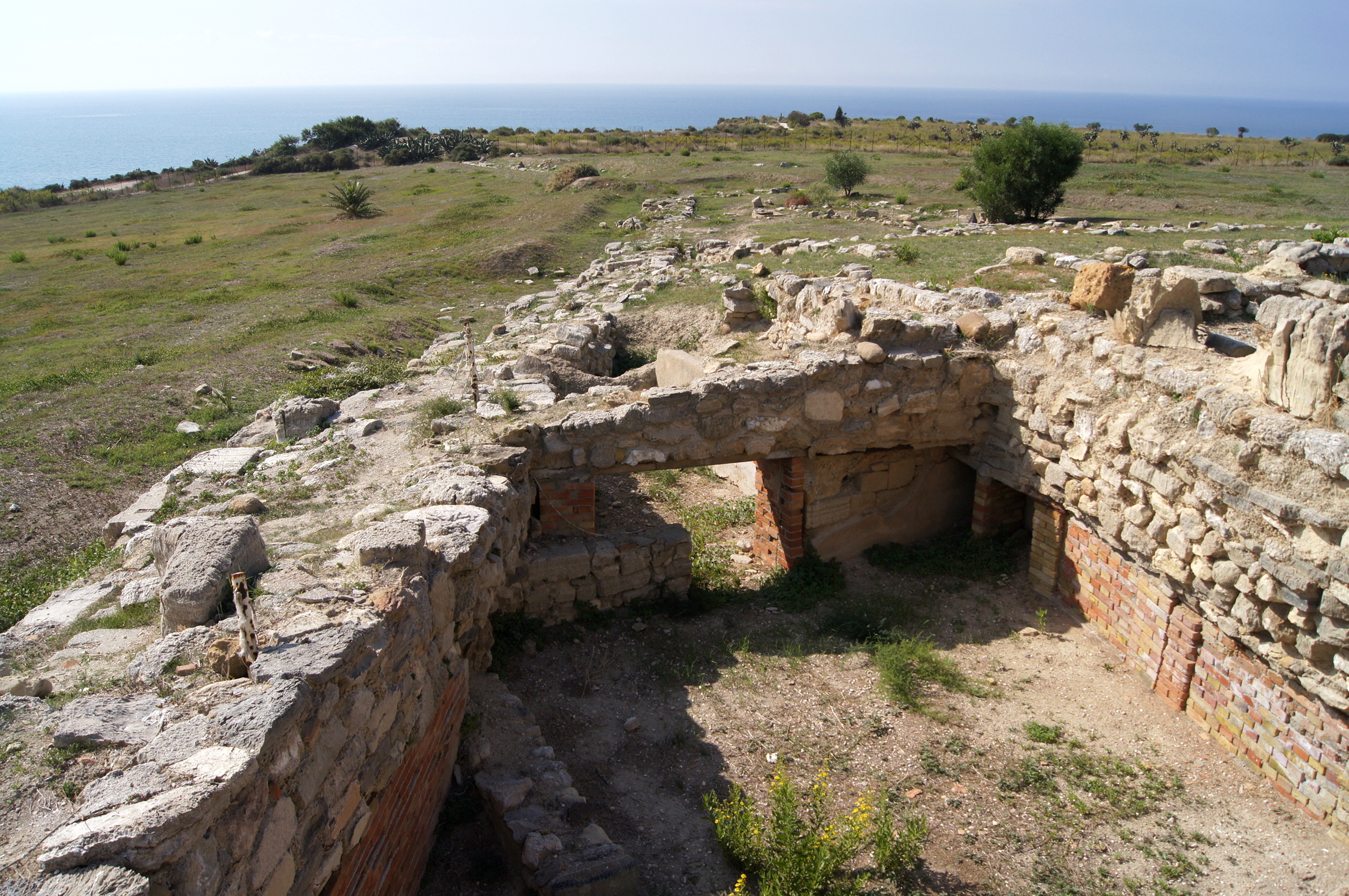
Last version of Walls built across the city's houses

The imposing walls are visible for most of their path, built of a chalky stone base and mud-bricks above and including square towers.

Four phases of construction are known, the earliest being of stone. The second wall was rebuilt twice, the last version in the 3rd-2nd c. BC restricting the city to the western part of the plateau, passing through the urban area including House A, reducing the enclosed area during the Punic and Servile wars.

== See also ==
- List of ancient Greek cities
