= Annalists =

Ancient writers on Roman history during the Republic

Annalists (from Latin annus, year; hence annales, sc. libri, annual records), were a class of writers on Roman history, the period of whose literary activity lasted from the time of the Second Punic War to that of Sulla. They wrote the history of Rome from the earliest times (in most cases) down to their own days, the events of which were treated in much greater detail. Annalists were different from historians, in that an annalist was more likely to just record events for reference purposes, rather than offering their own opinions of events. There is, however, some overlap between the two categories and sometimes annalist is used to refer to both styles of writing from the Roman era.

== Different generations ==
For the earlier period, the authorities of annalists were to record state and family records—above all, the annales maximi (or annales pontificum), the official chronicle of Rome, in which the notable occurrences of each year from the foundation of the city were set down by the Pontifex Maximus. Although these annals were no doubt destroyed at the time of the burning of Rome by the Gauls, they were restored as far as possible and continued until the pontificate of P. Mucius Scaevola, by whom they were finally published in eighty books.

Two generations of these annalists have been distinguished—an older and a younger. The older, which extends to 150 BC, set forth, in bald, unattractive language, without any pretensions to style, but with a certain amount of trustworthiness, the most important events of each successive year. Cicero (De Oratore, ii. 12. 53), comparing these writers with the old Ionic logographers, says that they paid no attention to ornament, and considered the only merits of a writer to be intelligibility and conciseness. Their annals were a mere compilation of facts.

The younger generation, in view of the requirements and criticism of a reading public, cultivated the art of composition and rhetorical embellishment. As a general rule the annalists wrote in a spirit of uncritical patriotism, which led them to minimize or gloss over such disasters as the conquest of Rome by Porsena and the compulsory payment of ransom to the Gauls, and to flatter the people by exaggerated accounts of Roman prowess, dressed up in fanciful language. At first they wrote in Greek, partly because a national style was not yet formed, and partly because Greek was the fashionable language amongst the educated, although Latin versions were probably published as well.

The first of the annalists, the father of Roman history, as he has been called, was Q. Fabius Pictor; contemporary with him was Lucius Cincius Alimentus, who flourished during the Hannibalic war (not to be confused with L. Cincius, the author of various political and antiquarian treatises (de Fastis, de Comitiis, de Priscis Verbis), who lived in the Augustan age, to which period Mommsen, considering them a later fabrication, refers the Greek annals of L. Cincius Alimentus). Like Fabius Pictor, he wrote in Greek. He was taken prisoner by Hannibal (Livy xxi. 38), who is said to have given him details of the crossing of the Alps. His work embraced the history of Rome from its foundation down to his own days. With M. Porcius Cato historical composition in Latin began, and a livelier interest was awakened in the history of Rome.

== Notable writers ==
Among the principal writers of this class who succeeded Cato, the following may be mentioned:

- L. Cassius Hemina (about 146 BC), in the fourth book of his Annals, wrote on the Second Punic War. His research went back to very early times; Pliny (Nat. Hist. xiii. 13 [27]) calls him vetustissimus auctor annalium, the original author of the annalists.
- L. Calpurnius Piso, surnamed Frugi, wrote seven books of annals, relating the history of the city from its foundation down to his own times. Livy regards him as a less trustworthy authority than Fabius Pictor, and Niebuhr considers him the first to introduce systematic forgeries into Roman history.
- Q. Claudius Quadrigarius (about 80 BC) wrote a history, in at least twenty-three books, which began with the conquest of Rome by the Gauls and went down to the death of Sulla or perhaps later. He was freely used by Livy in part of his work (from the sixth book onwards). A long fragment is preserved in Aulus Gellius (ix. 13), giving an account of the single combat between Manlius Torquatus and the Gaul. His language was antiquated and his style dry, but his work was considered important.
- Valerius Antias, a younger contemporary of Quadrigarius, wrote the history of Rome from the earliest times, in a voluminous work consisting of seventy-five books. He is notorious for his wilful exaggeration, both in narrative and numerical statements. For instance, he asserts the number of the Sabine virgins to have been exactly 527; again, in a certain year when no Greek or Latin writers mention any important campaign, Antias speaks of a big battle with enormous casualties. Nevertheless, Livy at first made use of him as one of his chief authorities, until he became convinced of his untrustworthiness.
- G. Licinius Macer (died 66 BC), who has been called the last of the annalists, wrote a voluminous work, which, although he paid great attention to the study of his authorities, was too rhetorical, and exaggerated the achievements of his own family. Having been convicted of extortion, he committed suicide (Cicero, De Legibus, i. 2, Brutus, 67; Plutarch, Cicero, 9).

== Other annalists ==
The writers mentioned dealt with Roman history as a whole; some of the annalists, however, confined themselves to shorter periods:

- L. Coelius Antipater (about 120 BC) limited himself to the Second Punic War. His work was overloaded with rhetorical embellishment, which he was the first to introduce into Roman history. He was regarded as the most careful writer on the war with Hannibal, and one who did not allow himself to be blinded by partiality in considering the evidence of other writers (Cicero, De Oratore, ii. 12). Livy made great use of him in his third decade.
- Sempronius Asellio (about 100 BC), military tribune of Scipio Africanus at the siege of Numantia, composed Rerum Gestarum Libri in at least fourteen books. As he himself took part in the events he describes, his work was a kind of memoirs. He was the first of his class who endeavoured to trace the causes of events, instead of contenting himself with a bare statement of facts.
- L. Cornelius Sisenna (119–67 BC), legate of Pompey in the war against the pirates, lost his life in an expedition against Crete. He wrote twenty-three books on the period between the Social War and the dictatorship of Sulla. His work was commended by Sallust (Jugurtha, 95), who, however, blames him for not speaking out sufficiently. Cicero remarks upon his fondness for archaisms (Brutus, 74. 259). Sisenna also translated the tales of Aristides of Miletus, and is supposed by some to have written a commentary on Plautus. The autobiography of Sulla may also be mentioned.

== Criticism of the term ==
Cicero spoke harshly of the annalists. In De Oratore, he wrote: "Let me remind you that in the beginning the Greeks themselves also wrote like our Cato, Pictor, and Piso. History was nothing more than a compilation of yearly chronicles ... In this way, just as the Greeks had their Pherecydes, Hellanicus, Acusilaus, and others, so we have their equivalents in our own Cato, Pictor, and Piso, who have no idea by what means speech is given distinction – such things, after all, have only recently been introduced here –, and who suppose that, provided what they say is understood, the sole virtue of speaking is brevity."

This distinction between "annalists" and "historians", which has been influenced by Cicero's views, have been criticized by some modern scholars. Hans Beck notes that "a glance at the surviving fragments ... makes it plain that the conceptual assumptions of this model (lack of style, a mere compilation of people, places and prodigies) are not accurate." According to John Marincola, much of the discussion "centers around who should be considered a 'historian' and who an 'annalist'. Nonetheless, it remains questionable whether this approach too has any validity. First, such a distinction cannot be found in the ancient authors, where "scriptor annalium" or the like serve as a designation for all writers of history. Second, the Latin word annales means both history (in the aggregate and objective sense) and a particular history (the literary representation of events). Third, citations of Roman historians refer indiscriminately to annales and historia, which suggests not only that the writers themselves did not assign any such title as Annales to their works, but also that there cannot have been a recognized sub- genre of annales."

== See also ==
- Chronicle
- List of historians
