= Lucius Calpurnius Piso Frugi (consul 133 BC) =

Roman historian, censor, consul, and judicial reformer

Lucius Calpurnius Piso Frugi (c. 180 – 112 BC) was a Roman politician and historian. He created the first permanent jury court in Rome (quaestio perpetua) to try cases related to provincial corruption during his plebeian tribunate in 146 BC. He also fought, not entirely successfully, in the First Servile War. He was consul in 133 BC and censor in 120 BC.

Later in life, he wrote the Annales, a history of Rome from its foundation through to at least 146 BC and probably his own time; only 49 fragments of the Annales survive, preserved in other works. Consisting of seven or eight books, it was the first history to split up Roman history into a year-by-year account.

== Family ==
Piso belonged to the plebeian gens Calpurnia, which emerged during the First Punic War and was of Etruscan descent. The Pisones were the most important family of the gens and remained on the fore of Roman politics during the Empire; their first member was Gaius Calpurnius Piso, praetor in 211, also grandfather of this Piso. The praetor of 211 had two sons, Gaius, the first consul of the gens in 180 who also earned a triumph for his successful command in Spain in 186, and Lucius, only known as ambassador to the Achaean League in 198; the latter was the father of the historian. The next generation of the Calpurnii Pisones had an impressive number of consuls – four in 16 years – as in addition to Piso's own consulship in 133, his cousins Lucius Caesoninus, Gnaeus, and Quintus were also consuls, respectively in 148, 138 and 135. Piso was likely born between 182 and 179.

This Piso had a homonymous son, who was later praetor in 112 BC. The son's line eventually produced the Gaius Calpurnius Piso who was the husband of Cicero's daughter Tullia.

== Career ==
=== Tribunate and lex Calpurnia ===
Piso probably did his ten-year military service between 165 and 152. Piso is first mentioned in the sources as plebeian tribune in 149. The previous year, the propraetor Servius Sulpicius Galba had slaughtered eight or nine thousand Lusitanians through treachery. After accepting their unconditional surrender in good faith, he rounded up entire Lusitanian communities, disarmed them, and then massacred their male populations en masse before enslaving the remainder.

When Galba returned to Rome in 149, he was sued before the people by Lucius Scribonius Libo, Piso's colleague as tribune of the plebs; despite Cato the Censor's vehement support of the accusation, Galba was acquitted. Both Cato and Piso had clients in Spain who were worried by Galba's exactions; they asked their patrons to protect them. Piso therefore brought the lex Calpurnia de repetundis, which established the first permanent criminal court to judge Roman governors' provincial misdeeds. Before 149, governors were judged by an ad hoc court which was only sometimes created for that purpose.

The lex Calpurnia provided that the peregrine praetor directed the court and chose the jurors from the senate; governors found guilty had to repay the sums extorted. The law was a milestone in Roman criminal law – it "provided the model for other permanent criminal tribunals" in the future – and reflected the concern in the senate that unchecked gubernatorial avarice and disregard for norms of war would alienate provincial populations and harm Rome's foreign reputation.

=== Praetorship ===
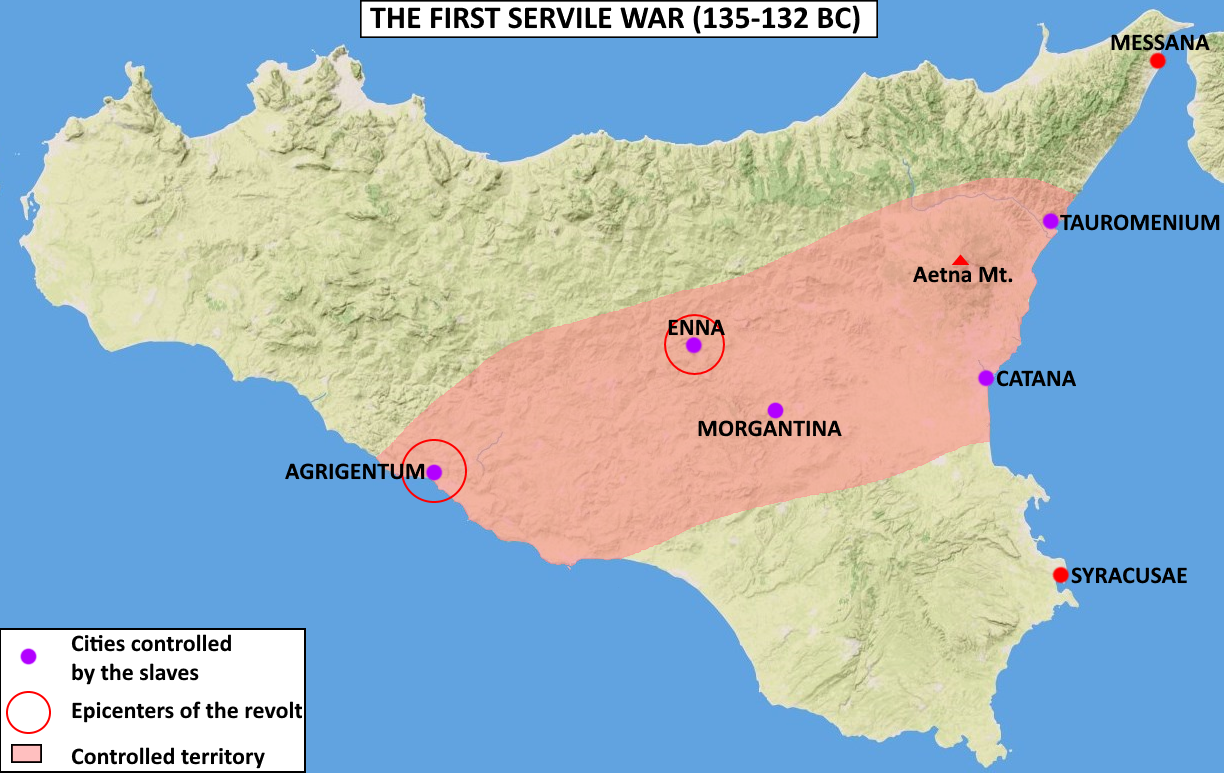
The area controlled by the slaves during the First Servile War.

Piso was certainly praetor before 135 BC, as the lex Villia required a three-year wait between holding two magistracies (and Piso was consul in 133). The dominant opinion among modern scholars is that Piso served as praetor in Sicily in a year between 138 and 136, and he was defeated by the revolted slaves of Eunus during the First Servile War. However, knowledge of this war is very poor, and mostly comes from epitomes deriving from the lost books of Livy's Ab Urbe Condita. The only mention of Piso as praetor in ancient sources is found in the epitome of Florus (dating from the 2nd century AD), who says that "The camps even of praetors (the utmost disgrace of war) were taken by him [Eunus]; nor will I shrink from giving their names; they were the camps of [Manlius], Lentulus, Piso, and Hypsaeus". From there, it has been assumed that Florus gave the names of the successive Sicilian praetors in reverse chronological order between 138 and 135.

Corey Brennan, a classicist, nevertheless notes that Florus is often careless in his chronology, and also frequently mixes commanders' titles. What he calls "praetor" could have been legate, quaestor, praetor, or even consul. Therefore, Brennan suggests instead that Piso did not serve in Sicily as praetor, but only as consul in 133. Since Florus tells Piso was defeated, it would be very strange to see him winning the consular election at the first possible occasion: the other identified commanders fared far more poorly, either disappearing from history altogether or waiting many years until their consulships.

=== Consulship ===
Piso was elected consul for 133 BC with Publius Mucius Scaevola as his colleague. Scaevola and Piso are respectively described as consul prior and posterior, which means the comitia centuriata elected Scaevola first. He was assigned Sicily as his province and commanded the war against the slaves, while Scaevola remained in Rome. Sicily was initially given to a praetor, but since the praetors sent in 136 and 135 against the revolted slaves were defeated, the senate dispatched a consul in 134 to deal with them; however, the previous consul, Gaius Fulvius Flaccus, did nothing of note.

Piso probably picked the praetor Marcus Perperna to serve with him in Sicily, because he was a homo novus with an Etruscan background. He likely started his campaign by taking Morgantina and besieging Henna, the epicentre of the rebellion, because several sling bullets bearing his name have been found in the area. Then, Piso might have left the conduct of the siege to Perperna while he campaigned in another part of Sicily. The First Servile War ended the following year when the consul Publius Rupilius captured Tauromenium and Perperna took Henna.

=== Gracchan opposition ===
Since Piso was in Sicily during his entire consulship, ancient sources do not tell his attitude towards Tiberius Gracchus, who as plebeian tribune moved an ambitious set of reforms to redistribute Roman public lands. It is generally assumed that Piso was among his opponents, because he was later an outspoken enemy of Gaius Gracchus (Tiberius' younger brother), but several politicians initially supported Tiberius and later opposed his reforms or his attempt to be reelected as tribune, starting with Scaevola, Piso's consular colleague. D C Earl suggests that Piso initially regarded Tiberius' program with a "benevolent neutrality" as he had connections with the Fulvii Flacci and the patrician Claudii, who were Gracchan allies.

The main anecdote for Piso's opposition is an anecdote placed in his mouth by Cicero. According to Cicero, after Gaius Gracchus passed a law establishing a subsidised grain supply over Piso's opposition, Piso appeared in the queue and when Gaius enquired as to his hypocrisy, he responded "I'm not keen, Gracchus... on you getting the idea of sharing out my property man by man, but if that's what you're going to do, I'll take my cut".

=== Censorship ===
Piso was elected censor in 120 together with the plebeian Quintus Caecilius Metellus Baliaricus. The Fasti Capitolini are missing for these years, but since later writers citing or mentioning Piso tell he was censor, he must have been censor in 120 as it is the only year available. As a result, nothing is known of the censors' activity, apart that they likely reappointed Publius Cornelius Lentulus as princeps senatus.

The censors' election took place in the aftermath of the murder of Gaius Gracchus and his supporters in 121, which saw the domination of the conservative faction led by the powerful Caecilii Metelli family, and further indicates Piso's conservative background.

== The Annales ==
At the end of his life, Piso wrote a history of Rome, following several earlier Roman statesmen who wrote history, such as Cato the Censor, or Aulus Postumius Albinus. Among the 19 mentions of Piso's work found in ancient sources, 16 call it Annales, suggesting that was Piso's title. The last dated fragment of the Annales deals with the fourth ludi saeculares, an event taking place in 146, so Piso likely started his book after this date. As there are an unusual number of references to censorial activity in the Annales' fragments, it is probable that Piso wrote them in his later years, after his own censorship in 120, a situation similar to that of Cato who composed the Origines in his last years. Moreover, later authors who cite Piso often call him Censorius ("the censor"), suggesting he was already an ex-censor when he wrote it. This additional name might have been used by Piso in his work.

The Annales were written in at least seven books, from the legendary foundation of Rome by Aeneas to Piso's own times. Like most other Roman historians, Piso devoted a significant portion of the work to mythologic times and the Regal period, covered in the first book. The second book likely covered the beginnings of the Republic to a milestone event such as the Fall of Veii in 396, or the Sack of Rome in 387. The third book probably described the events up to the War against Pyrrhus (280–275) or the First Punic War (264–241). The chronology for the remaining four books is lacking; Piso possibly wrote about the events down to the second half of the 2nd century by covering one generation per book. The majority of modern historians think that Piso continued his work after the last fragment dated from 146 in order to describe the events of his consulship and censorship. The existence of an 8th book has been suggested, in which Piso could have written an apologia of his political deeds during his magistracies.

His historical account, now lost and known to us from only forty-nine short quotations or paraphrases, was written in a simple style of Latin. He also was likely the first to have incorporated material from the annales maximi – the records kept by the pontiffs – into a historical work. He also revised the genealogy of the Tarquins, connecting Tarquinius Superbus as grandson of Tarquinius Priscus rather than as son due to chronological improbability of a direct relationship when taking into account the intervening 44-year reign of Servius Tullius. Later historians relied upon his work, though many did not find it satisfactory. Cicero considered his work jejune, and Livy did not consider him fully reliable, due to his tendency to moralize and politicize the histories that he recounted. Aulus Gellius, however, an admirer of its archaic style, commended the work and quoted the only major fragment that has survived until today.

Moreover, the early 19th-century iconoclastic historian, Barthold Georg Niebuhr, wrote that Piso was the first Roman historian to introduce systematic forgeries. Despite its shortcomings, Piso's historical work is important because it was the first time that an account was structured into individual years, making it the earliest history to follow the so-called "annalistic scheme." Modern historians also value the fragments contained in it as reflecting earlier traditions free from latter-day inventions and insertions.

=== List of fragments ===
| Cornell n° | Forsythe n° | Peter n° | Piso's book n° | author | ref. | subject |
|---|---|---|---|---|---|---|
| 1 | 2 | 1 | 1 | Varro | Rust. ii. 1 § 9 | Etymology of Italy |
| 2 | 4 | 41 | 1 | Lactantius | Inst. i. 6 § 9 | Name of a Sibyl |
| 3 | 5 | | 1 | OGR | x. 1-2 | Aeneas in Italy |
| 4 | 6 | | 1 | OGR | xiii. 8 | Suicide of Amata |
| 5 | 9 | 3 | 1 | Diodorus | i. 75 § 4 – 84 § 1 | Story of Romulus and Remus |
| 6 | 4 | 4 | 1 | Servius | Aen. ii. 761 | The Roman asylum |
| 7 | 11 | 5 | 1 | Diodorus | ii. 38 § 2 – 40 § 3 | Story of Tarpeia |
| 8 | 12 | 6 | 1 | Varro | Ling. v. 148, 149 | Etymology of the Lacus Curtius |
| 9 | 14 | 7 | 1 | Tertullian | Spect. v. 8 | Creation of the Tarpeian/Capitoline Games by Romulus |
| 10 | 13 | 8 | 1 | Aulus Gellius | xi. 14 | Romulus' wine consumption |
| 11 | 15 | 9 | 1 | Varro | Ling. v. 165 | Foundation of the Temple of Janus |
| 12 | 17 | 10 | 1 | Pliny the Elder | HN, ii. 140 | Numa summoning thunderbolts |
| 13 | 18 | 12 | 1 | Plutarch | Numa, 21 § 7 | Death of King Numa Pompilius |
| 14 | 19 | 11 | 1 | Pliny the Elder | HN, xiii. 84–87 | Quintus Petillius burns Numa's books |
| 15a | 17 | 10 | 1 | Pliny the Elder | HN, ii. 140 | Numa summoning thunderbolts |
| 15b | 20 | 13 | 1 | Pliny the Elder | HN, xxviii. 13, 14 | Death of King Tullus Hostilius |
| 16 | 21 | 14 | 1 | Diodorus | iv. 15 § 5 | First census of Servius Tullius |
| 17 | 23 | 17 | 1 | Priscian | GL, ii. 497 | Marriage of Tarquin's daughter? |
| 18 | 22A | 15 | 1 or 2 | Diodorus | iv. 7 § 1–5 | Descendants of Tarquin |
| 19 | 24 | 17 | 1 or 2 | Livy | i. 55 § 7–9 | Construction cost of the Temple of Jupiter |
| 20 | 26 | 19 | 2 | Aulus Gellius | xv. 29 | Abdication of L. Tarquinius Collatinus in 509 |
| 21 | 25 | 18 | 2 | Priscian | GL, ii. 510, 511 | Rape of Lucretia? |
| 22 | 27 | 20 | 2 or 3 | Pliny the Elder | HN, xxxiv. 29 | Building of the statue of Cloelia in 508 or 507 |
| 23 | 28 | 21 | 2 or 3 | Pliny the Elder | HN, xxxiii. 38 | Gold crown given by A. Postumius Albus after his victory in 499 |
| 24 | 29 | 22 | 2 or 3 | Livy | ii. 32 § 3 | First Secession of the Plebs in 494 |
| 25 | 30 | 23 | 2 or 3 | Livy | ii. 58 § 1, 2 | Number of the tribune of the plebs in 471 |
| 26 | 31 | 24 | 2 or 3 | Diodorus | xii. 4 § 2–5 | Murder of Spurius Maelius by Gaius Servilius Ahala |
| 27 | 32 | 25 | 2 or 3 | Diodorus | xii. 9 § 3 | First celebration of the lectisternium in 399 |
| 28 | 36 | 26 | 2 or 3 | Livy | ix. 44 § 2–4 | Name of the consuls in 308 and 305 |
| 29 | 37 | 27 | 3 | Aulus Gellius | vii. 9 | Gnaeus Flavius' aedileship in 304 |
| 30 | 38 | 28 | 3–7 | Livy | x. 9 § 12, 13 | Names of the aediles in 299 |
| 31 | 39 | 29 | 3–7 | Pliny the Elder | HN, xvi. 192 | Building time of the fleet during the First Punic War, in 263 |
| 32 | 40 | 30 | 3–7 | Pliny the Elder | HN, viii. 16, 17 | Elephants during the triumph of L. Caecilius Metellus in 250 |
| 33 | 41 | 31 | 3–7 | Pliny the Elder | HN, xvi. 192 | Triumph of Gaius Papirius Maso on the Alban mount.in 231 |
| 34 | 42 | 32 | 3–7 | Livy | xxv. 39 § 11–17 | Aftermath of the Upper Baetis, and victories of L. Marcius in 211 |
| 35 | 43 | 33 | 3–7 | Pliny the Elder | HN, xviii. 41–43 | Trial of Gaius Furius Chresimus in 191 |
| 36 | 44 | 34 | 3–7 | Pliny the Elder | HN, xxxiv. 14 | Riches brought to Rome by Gnaeus Manlius Vulso in 187 |
| 37 | 45 | 35 | 3–7 | Pliny the Elder | HN, iii. 131 | M. Claudius Marcellus destroys a Gallic town near Aquileia in 186 |
| 38 | 46 | 36 | 3–7 | Censorinus | 17 § 13 | Date of the 6th saeculum |

== See also ==
- Annals & Annalists
- Roman historiography

Political offices
| Preceded by Scipio Aemilianus II; Gaius Fulvius Flaccus | Roman consul 133 BC; With: Publius Mucius Scaevola | Succeeded by P. Popillius Laenas; Publius Rupilius |
