= Publius Popillius Laenas =

See also Popilius (disambiguation)

Publius Popillius Laenas was consul in 132 BC, and builder of the Via Popilia.

When consul he incurred the hatred of the populares by his harsh measures as head of a special commission appointed to take measures against the accomplices of Tiberius Gracchus. In 123 BC Gaius Gracchus brought in a bill prohibiting all such commissions, and declared that, in accordance with the old laws of appeal, a magistrate who pronounced sentence of death against a Roman citizen, without the people's assent, should be guilty of high treason. It is not known whether the bill contained a retrospective clause against Laenas, but he left Rome and sentence of banishment from Italy was pronounced against him. After the restoration of the aristocracy the enactments against him were cancelled, and he was recalled.

The name of the town of Forlimpopoli is probably related to Publius Popillius Laenas who might have founded it during his time as consul.

== See also ==
- Laenas

== Notes ==
Political offices
Preceded by Publius Mucius Scaevola and Lucius Calpurnius Piso Frugi	Consul of the Roman Republic; With: Publius Rupilius 132 BC	Succeeded by Publius Licinius Crassus Dives Mucianus and Lucius Valerius Flaccus
