= Milesians =

Milesia, Milesian, Milesians, or Miletans may refer to:

- Milesians (Irish), a people figuring in Irish mythology
- Milesians (Greek), the inhabitants of Miletus, a city in the Anatolia province of modern-day Turkey
- Milesian school, a school of thought founded in the 6th century BC and exemplified by three philosophers from Miletus
- Milesian tale, a genre of salacious or exotic narrative
- Milesia (fly), a genus of very large hoverflies
