= Wallace Lindsay =

British classical scholar and palaeographer (1858–1937)

Wallace Martin Lindsay FBA (12 February 1858 – 21 February 1937) was a Scottish classical scholar of the late 19th and early 20th centuries and a palaeographer. He was Professor of Humanity at University of St Andrews.

== Biography ==
Lindsay was born in Pittenweem, Fife, to Alexander Lindsay, a Free Church minister, and his wife Susanna Irvine (née Martin). Educated at Edinburgh Academy, the University of Glasgow, where he was Blackstone Scholar, and Balliol College, Oxford. He was a fellow of Jesus College, Oxford, from 1880 to 1899, when he was appointed as Professor of Humanity (as the professorship in Latin was called) at the University of St Andrews.

Lindsay wrote numerous studies, covering a range of topics in Latin from the works of Plautus and Martial to the development of medieval Latin. Some of his books were translated into French and German. He also wrote articles in the 1911 Encyclopædia Britannica and notes on the palaeography of the Cathach of St. Columba.

He pioneered the study of Latin and Celtic words. Through prolific scholarship and editing a large number of texts, including Plautus, Terence, Martial in the OCT, and Festus, and Nonius Marcellus in Teubner editions, he influenced almost every area of Latin research.

He received an honorary doctorate (LLD) from the University of Glasgow in April 1902.

Lindsay died at St Andrews after a collision with a motor bike.

== See also ==
- Natural History (Pliny)
