= Lucius Cornelius Sisenna =

Lucius Cornelius Sisenna (c. 120 – 67 BC) was a Roman soldier, historian, and annalist. He was praetor in 78 BC.

== Life ==
Little is known of Sisenna's life or family. The first Cornelius Sisenna (perhaps Lucius' grandfather or great-grandfather) appears as urban praetor in 183 BCE. It is not thought that his family, the Cornelii Sisennae, were related to the patrician branches of the famous gens Cornelia, with some scholars suggesting that the Sisennae hailed from Etruria instead.

It is likely that Sisenna actively supported Sulla during the civil wars of the 80s BCE. He was friends with some of Sulla's most important associates, including Lucullus, and was apparently overly partial towards Sulla in his writings. Moreover, soon after Sulla's dictatorship, Sisenna was elected to the praetorship for 78 BCE, which implies that he had benefitted politically from Sulla's victory.

Apart from his praetorship in 78 BCE, very little is known of Sisenna's political career. It has been suggested that he governed Sicily in 77 BCE after his praetorship, but it is impossible to be certain. Later, he contributed to the failed defence of Verres, prosecuted by Cicero in 70 BCE. He was also chosen as a legate for Pompey's campaign against the pirates, and was killed in action on Crete in 67 BCE.

== Histories ==
Sisenna is most noteworthy as the author of a lost Histories covering the years ca. 90 to 78 BCE. Nothing survives of this work save a few fragments, mostly preserved by the late antique grammarian Nonius Marcellus. But according to Christopher Krebs, it is through his work "that historia acquires its peculiar and previously unattested meaning of “contemporary history.”

It seems Sisenna's history ran to at least 12 books, but perhaps as many as 23. It covered in detail the Social War and Sulla's civil wars of the 80s BCE. Sallust, whose fragmentary Histories start in the year 78 BCE, seems to have begun his work as a continuation of Sisenna.

Sisenna's work was widely read in antiquity, and became a crucial source for the 80s BCE: in Ernst Badian's words, it was "the standard history of the period". Cicero, Sallust, Tacitus, and Velleius Paterculus all cite Sisenna at some point, and other historians are assumed to have used him extensively as well, such as Livy, Appian, and Cassius Dio.

Despite his wide readership, few direct judgements on Sisenna survive. Cicero states that Sisenna was a learned man dedicated to his studies (doctus vir et studiis optimis deditus), and claims that his history 'far surpassed all its predecessors' (facile omnis vincat superiores). Sallust also commends Sisenna, calling his account of Sulla's life 'the best and most carefully written' (optime et diligentissime omnium). Sallust does, however, critique him for being overly partisan towards Sulla.

Cicero also mentions that Sisenna was fond of unusual and antiquated language: he sought to be a 'reformer of ordinary speech' (quasi emendator sermonis usitati), and persisted in using 'strange and unheard-of words' (minus inusitatis verbis uteretur).

Sisenna may also be the writer, mentioned by Ovid, who translated a collection of erotic and picaresque tales by Aristides of Miletus entitled Milesiae fabulae, which was said to have served as a model for Petronius' Satyricon. However, this identification has been called into question by some scholars.
