= Nonius Marcellus =

Roman grammarian

Nonius Marcellus was a Roman grammarian of the 4th or 5th century AD. His only surviving work is the De compendiosa doctrina, a dictionary or encyclopedia in 20 books that shows his interests in antiquarianism and Latin literature from Plautus to Apuleius. Nonius may have come from Africa.

== Life ==
Little is known about Nonius. The full title of his work, Noni Marcelli Peripatetici Tubursicensis de Conpendiosa Doctrina ad filium, indicates that he was a Peripatetic philosopher from Thubursicum in Numidia. An inscription at Thubursicum dedicated by a certain "Nonius Marcellus Herculius" in 323 AD indicates that his family was based in that area. Since Nonius does not mention Christianity and calls himself a peripatetic, he seems not to have converted.

Nonius quotes Aulus Gellius and other 2nd-century compilers, and is himself quoted and praised three times by Priscian in the 5th century, and so must have lived between these dates. According to the Cambridge History of Classical Literature, he was probably active in the first half of the 4th century, although some scholars of the 19th and early 20th centuries thought he might have lived later in the 4th or even in the 5th century. More recently it has been argued that Nonius lived in the Severan period and can be dated to around A.D. 205–20.

== Works ==
The De compendiosa doctrina is one of the major sources for lost works of the Roman Republic, including the tragedies of Accius and Pacuvius, the satires of Lucilius, and the history of Sisenna. It consists of words, a short definition, and then quotations of authors using the word. It has been printed under a number of titles, including De proprietate latini sermonis and De varia significatione Verborum. It is one of three major Latin dictionaries preserved from antiquity, along with that of Festus, which was an epitome of Verrius Flaccus' work De verborum significatu, and the Etymologiae of Isidore of Seville.

The first twelve of Nonius's twenty books are organized grammatically around words or forms of words, and the remaining eight by subject matter such as clothing, weapons, food, etc. Each entry of either type consists of a brief definition and quotations from Republican-era writers, taken from 2nd-century sources, including Aulus Gellius and Fronto, rather than the original texts. "His ignorance and inattention," notes the Cambridge History of Classical Literature, "diminish but cannot destroy the value of his compilation."

The research of W. M. Lindsay and later of Strzelecki has shown that Nonius obtained many of his lemmata (entries) and the first citation for each from earlier grammatical texts which are now lost. The remainder of the entries and the extra citations belong to 41 books which he either owned or borrowed from a local library. For each section (either a book or a letter entry within a book), Nonius worked through his 41 lists from 41 volumes in the same order, first to find the lead-citation, and then again in order for additional citations. Based on this methodology, it can be determined whether Nonius is quoting an author first-hand, or from a grammar which was full of errors.

The Doctrina preserves fragments from early dramatists, annalists, satirists, and antiquarian writers. In arranging quotations from authors, Nonius always follows the same order, beginning with Plautus and ending with Varro and Cato. The grammarians Priscian and Fulgentius borrowed largely from his book, and in the 5th century a certain Julius Tryphonianus Sabinus brought out a revised and annotated edition.

The Doctrina was edited with notes by J. Mercier in 1614 at Paris under the title De varia significatione Verborum. The page numbers of the Mercier edition are used as a reference in later editions (e.g. 121 M. means "page 121 of the Mercier edition").

Nonius also wrote a volume of letters On the neglect of study, which is lost but to which he refers in the Doctrina.

== Literature ==
=== Editions ===
- Christophe Plantin (1565): (Nonii Marcelli Compendiosa Doctrina ad filium) de Proprietate Sermonum
- L. Müller (1888): vol. 1, vol. 2.
- J. H. Onions (1895)
- W. M. Lindsay (Teubner, 1903, also with Müller's pagination): vol. 1, vol. 2, vol. 3.

=== Studies ===
- Articles in the Classical Review, Dec. 1888, June and July 1889.
- J. H. Onions, Classical Review Oct. 1890, Oct. 1895, Feb. 1896, Feb. 1902.
- W. M. Lindsay, Journal of Philology, xvi. (1888), xviii. (1890), (JH Onions), xxi. (1893). ("The Printed Editions of Nonius," by Henry Nettleship)
- W. M. Lindsay, 1901 article online at Google books here
- Paul Monceaux, Les Africains. Etude sur la littérature latine d'Afrique : les Païens, P., Lecène, Oudin & Cie, V+500pp (1894)
- W. S. Teuffel, History of Roman Literature (Eng. trans.), 404A;
- Martin Schanz, Geschichte der römischen Literatur, iv. 1 (1904).
