= Publius Licinius Crassus Dives Mucianus =

Roman consul in 131 BC

Publius Licinius Crassus Dives Mucianus (c. 180 BC – 130 BC) was the natural son of Publius Mucius Scaevola and Licinia, and brother of Publius Mucius Scaevola. He was adopted at an unknown date by Publius Licinius Crassus (consul 171 BC), his mother's brother, or (although improbable) by a son of the consul of 205 BC, Publius Licinus Crassus Dives.

== Career ==
Mucianus became Pontifex Maximus in 132 BC after the death of the exiled Pontifex Publius Cornelius Scipio Nasica Serapio. In 131 BC he was elected consul along with Lucius Valerius Flaccus, the Flamen Martialis. Mucianus forbade his colleague to fight against Aristonicus and fined him for neglecting his sacred duties. The people remitted the fine but wished Flaccus to submit to his religious superior. Mucianus, nevertheless, went to fight Aristonicus, who had occupied the kingdom of Pergamum, after it had been left to Rome in the will of Attalus III. He was the first Pontifex Maximus to leave Italy voluntarily (whereas Scipio Nasica Serapio had been sent out of Italy by the Senate). Crassus Mucianus met with defeat against Aristonicus, and while retreating, he was overtaken by the enemy and stabbed to death. According to one source, he deliberately refused to reveal his identity to avoid the humiliation of being captured alive.

According to ancient historians, he was a wealthy, cultivated man who spoke several varieties of Greek fluently. He and his brother supported political and economic reforms, and as such, were staunch supporters of Tiberius Sempronius Gracchus (killed 133 BC), who was married to his wife's niece, another Claudia. Crassus Mucianus later arranged the marriage of his younger daughter to Tiberius's younger brother Gaius.

== Family ==
Publius Licinius Crassus Mucianus was the son of Publius Mucius Scaevola and Licinia, the sister of Publius Licinius Crassus, consul in 171 BC. His paternal uncle, Quintus Mucius Scaevola, had been consul in 174 BC. His elder brother, Publius Mucius Scaevola, became consul in 133 BC. Thus, Crassus Mucianus was related to several consuls. His paternal grandfather, Quintus Mucius Scaevola, had been praetor in 215 BC, but had fallen ill and died before he could stand for election to the consulship.

Crassus Mucianus was probably born around 180 BC. The date of his adoption is unknown. He married Clodia, (possibly the sister of Appius Claudius Pulcher consul in 143 BC as well as censor and Princeps Senatus in 136 BC). He had several children with her, of whom at least one son and two daughters outlived him. His younger daughter, Licinia, was wife of Gaius Sempronius Gracchus, the would-be reformer who died in 121 BC.

A cousin was Quintus Mucius Scaevola Augur, consul in 117 BC, and friend, patron and tutor of Cicero. Crassus Mucianus's nephew was the rhetorician and jurist Quintus Mucius Scaevola Pontifex, son of Publius Mucius Scaevola. Both relatives died or were killed during the Social War.

The family Mucii gained several consulships between 175 BC and 95 BC, including no less than three consuls who became Pontifex Maximus (including Crassus Mucianus who was adopted out).

== See also ==
- Licinia (gens)
- Mucia (gens)

Political offices
Preceded by Publius Popillius Laenas and Publius Rupilius	Consul of the Roman Republic with Lucius Valerius Flaccus; 131 BC	Succeeded by Lucius Cornelius Lentulus and Marcus Perperna (Suffect: Appius Claudius Pulcher)
