= Lucius Valerius Flaccus (consul 131 BC) =

Roman general and statesman, Flamen Martialis

Lucius Valerius Flaccus was Flamen Martialis, and received the consulship in 131 BC with Publius Licinius Crassus, then Pontifex Maximus. Flaccus wished to undertake the command in the war against Aristonicus in Asia, but his colleague fined him for deserting the sacra entrusted to his care. The people, before whom the question was brought for decision, cancelled the fine, but compelled the Flamen to obey the Pontiff. He may possibly be the same as the one whose quaestor, Marcus Aemilius Scaurus, wanted to bring an accusation against him, though it is uncertain whether Scaurus was quaestor during the praetorship or consulship of Flaccus.
