= Sant' Angelo Roman bridge =

Coordinates: 39°07′58″N 16°16′28″E

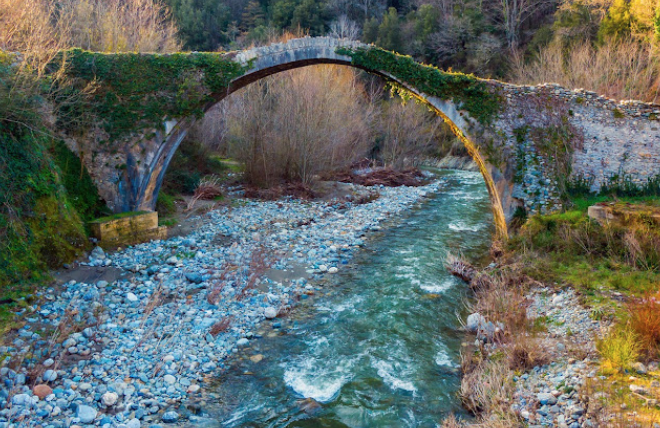
Hannibal's Bridge

Sant' Angelo Roman bridge, also known as Hannibal's Bridge (Italian: Ponte Annibale), or Ponte sul Savuto, is an ancient Roman bridge near the village of Scigliano, Italy. It was built from 131 to 121 BC as part of the Via Popilia, which led from Reggio Calabria to Capua, to cross the river Savuto.

It was built in two arches with stone from a nearby quarry. It has a width of 3.45 m, height of 11 m and length of about 25 m.

The bridge is thought to have been destroyed by the Romans themselves during Carthaginian commander Hannibal's campaign against Rome in the Second Punic War, to stop his escape towards his ships at sea. It was rebuilt with the same building material and in the same form by Hannibal for the passage of his army.

It is one of the oldest bridges in Italy together with the Pons Fabricius on the Tiber island (69 BC) and the Pons Aemilius (179 BC).
