= Popilius =

Popilius may refer to:

- the nomen of the Roman gens Popillia.
- Popilius (beetle) a genus of beetles in the family Passalidae
