= Via Popilia =

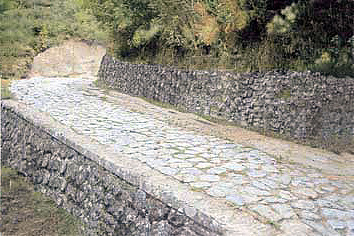
A sector of the Via Popilia (Capua-Rhegium) in the modern province of Reggio Calabria.

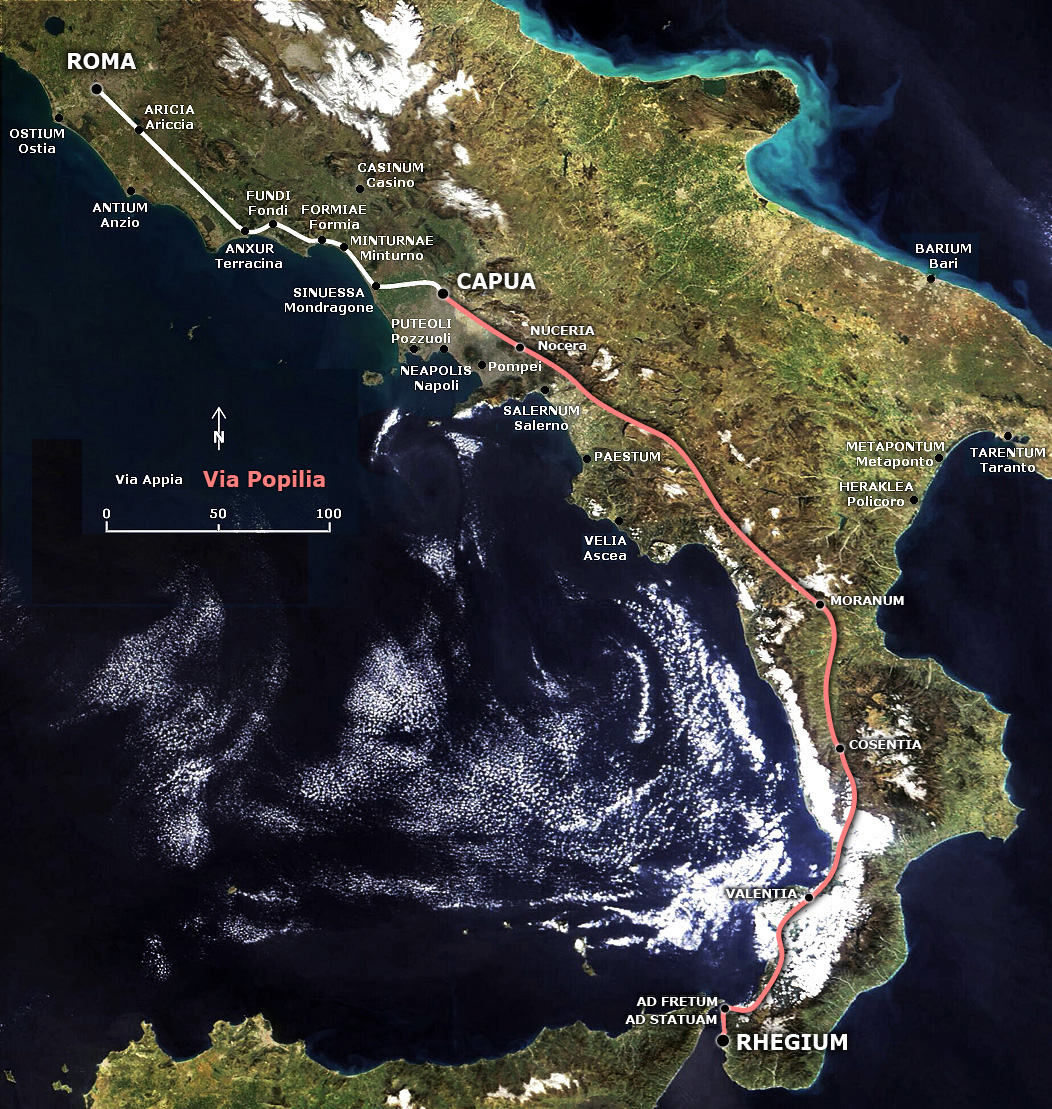
Map of via Popilia

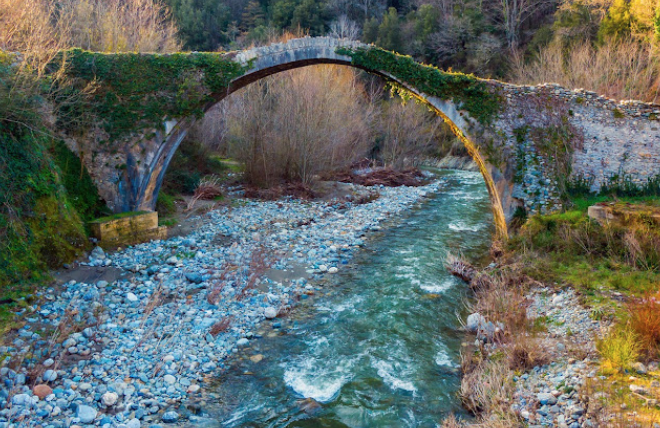
Sant' Angelo Roman bridge (Ponte sul Savuto) or Hannibal's bridge

The Via Popilia is the name of two different ancient Roman roads begun in the consulship of Publius Popilius Laenas. One was in southern Italy and the other was in north-eastern Italy.

== Road in southern Italy ==
The road in southern Italy ran from the Via Appia at Capua to Rhegium on the Straits of Messina. The discovery the Polla Tablet found in the church of San Pietro di Polla (Salerno) with part of its itinerarium engraved on stone brought it more fully into the light of history.

It was possibly built by Publius Popilius Laenas, consul of 132 BC, who founded Forum Popilii marked on the Tabula Peutingeriana. A milestone found in 1952 in Capua suggests that it was Annius who built and gave his name to the road, but he may have completed it.

It ran a distance of 321 Roman miles (475 km) through southern Campania and Calabria, through the interior of the country, not along the coast.

There are the remains of at least one Roman bridge along the road, the Sant' Angelo Roman bridge.

== Road in north-eastern Italy ==
The road in north-eastern Italy connected Ariminum (modern Rimini) to Atria (modern Adria). At Atria it joined the Via Annia which went to Patavium (modern Padua), Altinum and Aquileia. It was an extension of the Via Flaminia which connected Rome and Ariminum. Ariminum was also at the junction with the Via Aemilia which run through the plain of the River Po. This via Popilia was not mentioned in ancient sources. It was identified through a milestone found near Adria in 1844. It indicated the name of the man who had it built, Pulius Popilius, and that the origin of the road was 81 miles further south. This information, together with that provided by two Roman itineraries, the Antonine Itinerary and the Tabula Peutingeriana, has led to the identification of this road as having been built by the consul Publius Popilius Laenas, who was consul in 132 BCE and having had Ariminum as its starting point. The two itineraries indicated Ariminum as the starting point but did not mention Atria and have it ending in Altinum through different routes.

The idea that the older course of the Via Popilia reached Atria finds possible support through the proposed reconstructions of the Via Annia which have it starting at Atria. This gives a picture of carefully planned and continuous route which follows the Italian regions on the upper Adriatic Sea. The two mentioned itineraries differ in their depiction of the course. The former presents a journey which was mainly through watercourses, rivers and lagoons connected to each other by a network of canals. The latter depicts a land route with staging posts (mansiones, plural of mansio). The Ariminum to Ravenna tract went by the Sabis mansio and the current Cervia saltworks. North of Ravenna it continued towards the lagoon of Comacchio, flanking the Augusta canal commissioned by the emperor Augustus to connect Ravenna with the southern branch of the River Po, passing by the mansiones of Butrium and Augusta. The next mansio was Sacis ad Padum, near Spina, which was named after the Sagis branch of the Po. The road then crossed the Neronia canal and the Flavia canal and had the Neronia and Corniculani mansiones. It then reached the Hadriani mansio. Here the route split into two. The older one went to Atria. The other one went through the lagoon belt of the southern Veneto and reached Altinum.

The Ariminum to Ravenna tract seemed to use the coastal cliff and sandy strip. However, it seems to have later run into problems and for a stretch a more inland route, which in part followed the current via del Confine, was preferred, even though the coastal route continued to be used. The road must then have gone along a coastal path again and must have reached Cervia, on the coast, where archaeological ruins have been found. The Sabis mansio on the River Savio seems to have served both routes. The road then reached Ravenna. From there it followed the Augusta canal until Butrium (in today's Sant'Alberto, on the southern shore of the lagoon of Comacchio) which was on the now extinct Po di Primaro branch of the River Po and skirted the mentioned lagoon. Perhaps there was a port there. It then followed the Augusta embankment where there was the Augusta mansio of the Tabula Peutingeriana. It then crossed Valtrenus. It was thus described by Pliny the Elder, "By the Augustan canal the Padus [Po] is carried to Ravenna, at which place it is called the Padusa … The nearest mouth to this spot forms the extensive port known as that of Vatrenus …"

Slightly further north the road reached the now extinct Po Spinetico branch of the River Po, just before ancient Spina, just to the north of Comacchio. It then followed another extinct branch of the river, the Sagis, and reached the Sacis Ad Padum mansio, where a canal which was probably commissioned by the emperor Nero started. The road went through the Corniculani and Hadriani mansiones (perhaps in Codigoro and San Basiglio in the municipality of Ariano nel Polesine respectively). It then reached the Septem Maria (Seven Seas), which is indicated in the Antonine itinerary and was probably between Donada and Contarina in the municipality of Porto di Viro, close to Adria. The fossa Clodia canal started here, at the River Tartaro, and reached today's Chioggia in the Lagoon of Venice. The road then turned right, further inland, to reach Atria.

It is possible that in late antiquity, after Hadriani the coastal road followed a different course from that of the Popilia, which turned towards Atria but was not indicated in the Tabula Peutingeriana. The road probably decayed precociously, which explains the loss of the road name and the deterioration of the road system.

== See also ==
- Roman roads
- Roman bridges
- Roman engineering

== Bibliography ==
- Bosio L., La via Popilia-Annia, in Aquileia e l’arco adriatico, Udine 1990, pp. 43–60
- Dall'Aglio P.L., Di Cocco I., La linea e la rete. Formazione storica del sistema stradale in Emilia-Romagna, Milano 2006, pp. 202–212, 333-335
- Donati A., Verso il Nordest, in I Miliari. Lungo le strade dell'impero, Atti del Convegno (Isola della Scala, 28 novembre 2010), Cierre Edizioni, 2011, pp. 29–33; ISBN 978-8883146244
- F. Lenzi F., (a cura di), Regio VIII. Luoghi, uomini, percorsi dell'età romana in Emilia-Romagna, Bologna 2006, pp. 576–584
- Patitucci Uggeri S., Il sistema fluvio-lagunare, l’insediamento e le difese del territorio ravennate settentrionale (V-VIII secolo), in Ravenna da capitale imperiale a capitale esarcale, Atti del XVII congresso internazionale di studio sull'alto Medioevo (Ravenna, 6-12 giugno 2004), Fondazione CISAM, 2005, pp. 280–295, 340–341, 346–347; ISBN 978-8879881166
