= Publius Mucius Scaevola (consul 133 BC) =

Roman politician and jurist

Publius Mucius Scaevola (c. 176 BC – c. 115 BC) was a prominent Roman politician and jurist who was consul in 133 BC. In his earlier political career he served as tribune of the plebs in 141 BC and praetor in 136 BC. He also held the position of pontifex maximus for sixteen years after his consulship. He died around 115 BC.

Scaevola was consul at the time of Tiberius Gracchus' tribuneship and murder, and was heavily involved in reconciling the Senate following Gracchus' death. According to Cicero, Scaevola supported Gracchus' land reforms (Lex Sempronia Agraria), but the extent of his involvement has been debated by some historians.

== Family ==
Publius belonged to the gens Mucia, a noble plebeian family of Rome, of which the Scaevolae were the main branch. Several Scaevolae appear in Roman magistracies before the appearance of Publius Mucius, including a certain Publius Mucius Scaevola who served as a tribune of the plebs in 486 BC and a Publius Mutius Scaevola—who, while not of the same branch, clearly belongs to the Scaevola clan—who held the Tribunate of the Soldiers in the same year, suggesting the Scaevola family was an entrenched Republican family of senatorial class from at least 486 BC. In legend the Scaevolas draw their name from a Gaius Mucius Scaevola of 508 BC who supposedly attempted to assassinate the Etruscan king of Clusium, Lars Porsena and upon killing his secretary due to a mix up in interpreting Etruscan dress, thrust his arm into a brazier and declared that 300 young men like him would come for Porsena, leading to the king's withdrawal out of fear for his personal safety.

Publius Mucius Scaevola had a father of the same name, who was consul in 175 BC with Marcus Aemilius Lepidus. Scaevola served as pontifex maximus following his younger brother Publius Licinius Crassus Dives Mucianus's death. Mucianus was elected consul along with high priest Lucius Valerius Flaccus in 131 BC, after previously serving as Pontifex Maximus in 132 BC.

Scaevola was also the father of Quintus Mucius Scaevola who was a consul in 95 BC. He was responsible for the Lex Licinia Mucia, which sent Italian residents of Rome falsely claiming citizenship back to their own towns.

== Early political career ==
=== Tribune of the Plebs 141 BC ===
Publius Mucius Scaevola served as tribune of the plebs in 141 BC. The consuls of this year were Cnaeus Servilius Caepio and Quintus Pompeius. Not much is known of Scaevola's actions during his year as tribune. Most significant in the historical record is his carrying of a plebiscite which placed Hostilius Tubulus on trial for accepting bribes during his year as praetor in 142 BC.

=== Praetor 136 BC ===
Scaevola was elected as praetor in 136 BC. Lucius Furius Philus and Sextus Atilius Serranus were consuls during this year. During his year as a praetor Scaevola argued vehemently against the citizenship rights of Mancinus, who had demonstrated cowardice the previous year during a campaign in the Numantine War and had subsequently been surrendered to the Numantines as punishment, but had been rejected.

== Consulship 133 BC ==
=== Rome during Scaevola's Consulship ===
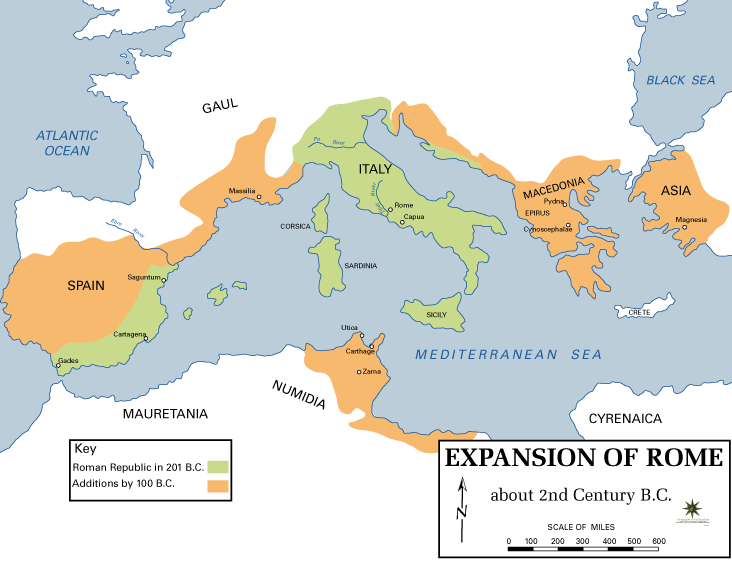

Publius was elected consul at a pivotal point in Roman history. The Punic Wars had ended only 13 years beforehand and Rome now controlled many new territories around the Mediterranean through military expeditions such as Scipio Aemilianus’ conquest of Numantia in modern-day Spain, as well as the annexation of Asia Minor. Upon the death of Attallus III of Pergamum in 133 BC Rome was granted the land belonging to Attalus in his will. However, an Attalid pretender called Eumenes III tried to retain the lands. In 130 BC he defeated Scaevola's brother and then-consul Publius Licinius Crassus Dives Mucianus, killing him. Later, Scaevola's son Quintus Mucius Scaevola engaged in more fighting in the region, though not of clear nature, receiving a proconsular command in 121 BC. The rapid expansionism throughout this period caused internal unrest that had triggered the First Servile War in Sicily two years earlier in 135 BC. Publius Mucius Scaevola's fellow consul Lucius Calpernius Piso led armies in 133 BC against the slave revolt on the island of Sicily. This revolt was led by a man named Eunus, a semi-prophetic military leader who managed to win several small scale engagements against larger Roman forces. Piso managed to suppress this long-running revolt, though Scaevola had little involvement in this campaign and therefore shared little of the popularity and prestige it incurred. At some point during this period both Piso and Scaevola were absent from the city of Rome, meaning the Senate was presided over by the urban praetor.

=== Tiberius Gracchus ===
==== Lex Sempronia Agraria ====
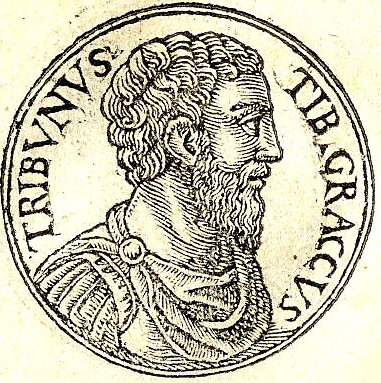
Woodcut portrait from Promptuarium Iconum Insigniorum (1553) by Guillaume Rouillé

Before Tiberius Gracchus drew up the highly significant Lex Sempronia agraria, he consulted with the preeminent citizens of the day, including Publius Mucius Scaevola, who was consul at the time. Plutarch describes Scaevola as a jurist, foremost in virtue and reputation. Following his consultation with Scaevola, among others, Gracchus drew up a law that was more lenient towards those occupying public lands than expected.

==== Jury (Gracchus vs. Scipio) ====
When conflict between Tiberius Gracchus and his opponents came to a head, Publius Mucius Scaevola publicly refused to support Scipio Nasica's attempt to depose Gracchus. But following Tiberius' death he tried to restore stability to the Senate, by retrospectively approving the violent events he had previously refused to support. Twentieth century historians have debated whether this about-face demonstrates a man of integrity standing above the factional squabbles in order to secure stability in precarious circumstances, or the propensity to change his factional allegiance at the drop of a hat. For example, in 1965 Erich S. Gruen depicted Publius Mucius Scaevola as a man constantly changing factional allegiance – describing him as a successful but unprincipled politician. In contrast, Wiseman, Bernstein, and Badian all argued in the early 1970s for a more favourable assessment of Scaevola as a man of independence and integrity.

== Later life ==
=== Pontifex maximus, 130-115 BC ===
Publius Mucius Scaevola became pontifex maximus in 130 BC, after his brother, Publius Licinius Crassus Dives Mucianus, was killed in battle while fighting in the kingdom of Pergamum. His most notable contribution during this period was the publication of the final Annales Maximi. The Annales Maximi were annals maintained by the pontifex maximus, dating back to 400 BC. The pontifex maximus, the highest-ranking priest in the Roman Republic, was responsible for recording significant events and the names of the magistrates of each year. The annals ceased being written in the 130s BC, and Publius Mucius Scaevola reportedly published the complete record in his official capacity.

=== Death ===
According to historian David Stockton, the exact year of Publius Mucius Scaevola's death is unknown. Later juristic writers indicate he was still alive in 121 BC, but he must have died some time before 114 BC, when a different chief pontiff presided over the trial of the Vestal Virgins.

Political offices
Preceded by Scipio Aemilianus; Gaius Fulvius Flaccus	Roman consul 133 BC; With: Lucius Calpurnius Piso Frugi	Succeeded by Publius Popillius Laenas; Publius Rupilius
