= Cleon (general) =

Cleon (died 132 BC) was an enslaved Cilician who became a general in the slave rebellion led by Eunus during the First Servile War. He was killed in 132 BC in Sicily.

Cleon was taken captive from Cilicia (modern-day Turkey) and enslaved by Romans in Sicily. He met the slave Eunus and became his general when Eunus began his rebellion in 135 BC. In his early success, Eunus declared himself as Antiochus. The large uprising of slaves, estimated by Titus Livius and Orosius to number 70,000, was defeated by Roman forces in 132 BC.
