= Publius Rupilius =

Roman senator

Publius Rupilius, Roman statesman, consul in 132 BC. During the inquiry that followed the death of Tiberius Gracchus, conducted by himself and his colleague Popillius Laenas, he proceeded with the utmost severity against the supporters of Gracchus. In the same year he was despatched to Sicily, where he suppressed the revolt of the slaves under Eunus. During 131 BC he remained as proconsul of the island, and, with the assistance of ten commissioners appointed by the Senate, drew up regulations for the organization of Sicily as a province. These regulations were known by the title of leges Rupiliae, though they were not laws in the strict sense. Rupilius was subsequently brought to trial (123 BC) and condemned for his treatment of the friends of Gracchus. The disgrace of his condemnation, added to disappointment at the failure of his brother to obtain the consulship in spite of the efforts of Scipio, caused his death shortly afterwards.

Preceded by Publius Mucius Scaevola; Lucius Calpurnius Piso Frugi	Roman consul 132 BC; With: Publius Popillius Laenas	Succeeded by Publius Licinius Crassus Dives Mucianus; Lucius Valerius Flaccus
