= Mucia gens =

Ancient Roman family

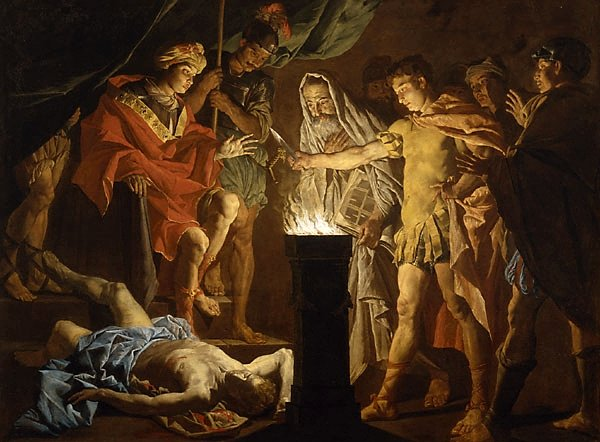
Gaius Mucius Scaevola in the Presence of Lars Porsena (early 1640s), oil painting by Matthias Stom (Art Gallery of New South Wales)

The gens Mucia was an ancient and noble plebeian house at ancient Rome. Members of this gens appear during the earliest period of the Republic, but the family only attained prominence from the time of the Second Punic War.

== Origin ==
The first of the Mucii to appear in history is Gaius Mucius Scaevola, a young man at the inception of the Roman Republic. According to legend, he volunteered to infiltrate the camp of Lars Porsena, the king of Clusium, who besieged Rome c. 508 BC, and who may in fact have captured and held the city for some time. Mucius, armed with a dagger, attempted to assassinate Porsena, but unfamiliar with Etruscan dress, he mistook the king's secretary for the king, and was captured.

Brought before the king, Mucius declared that he was but one of three hundred Roman men who had sworn to carry out this mission, or die in the attempt. As a show of bravery, it was said that he thrust his right hand into a brazier, and stood silently as it burned. Porsena was so impressed by his courage and endurance that Mucius was freed, and some traditions held that Porsena withdrew his army in fear of the threat of assassination invented by the young Roman.

At one time it was supposed that any Roman of consequence during this period must have been a patrician, and that the Mucii must therefore have been a patrician gens that was later supplanted by its plebeian descendants. But assuming that the would-be assassin was a real person, all of the other Mucii known to history seem to have been plebeians, suggesting that there may never have been a patrician family of this name.

== Praenomina ==
The only praenomina used by the Mucii mentioned during the Republic were Publius, Quintus, and Gaius, each of which were among the most common names at all periods of Roman history. Marcus is also found among the Mucii of imperial times.

== Branches and cognomina ==
The only major family of the Mucii bore the cognomen Scaevola. This surname is said to have been acquired by Gaius Mucius, who lost the use of his right hand following his attempt on the life of Lars Porsena, and was subsequently called Scaevola because only his left hand remained. The similar cognomen, Scaeva, which occurs in other gentes, including among the Junii, is generally assumed to mean "left handed", (Note: Scaeva could also refer to a favourable omen.) and Scaevola could be a diminutive form; but in ordinary usage, scaevola referred to an amulet.

The only other important cognomen of the Mucii was Cordus, borne by some of the Scaevolae. According to some traditions, Gaius Mucius was originally surnamed Cordus, and assumed the surname Scaevola on account of his deed before Porsena. However, it may be that the tradition concerning his right hand was a later addition to the story, intended to explain the descent of the Mucii Scaevolae from one of the heroes of the Republic. Although Gaius Mucius was a patrician, the later Mucii Scaevolae were plebeians.

== Members ==
This list includes abbreviated praenomina. For an explanation of this practice, see filiation.

- Gaius Mucius Scaevola, attempted the life of Lars Porsena, c. 508 BC.
- Publius Mucius Scaevola, tribune of the plebs in 486 BC, supposedly burned nine of his colleagues for conspiring with the consul Spurius Cassius Vecellinus.
- Publius Mucius Scaevola, father of the praetor of 215 BC.
- Quintus Mucius P. f. Scaevola, praetor in 215 BC, received Sardinia as his province. His command there was prolonged for three years. He may have been consul in 220.
- Publius Mucius Q. f. P. n. Scaevola, praetor in 179 BC, and consul in 175, triumphed over the Ligures.
- Quintus Mucius Q. f. P. n. Scaevola, praetor in 179 BC, and consul in 174.
- Publius Mucius (P. f. Q. n.) Scaevola, consul in 133 BC; two years later he succeeded his brother, Publius Licinius Crassus Dives Mucianus, as Pontifex Maximus. He was regarded as one of the founders of the jus civile.
- Publius Licinius Crassus Dives Mucianus, Pontifex Maximus, and consul in 131 BC; he was defeated and killed by Aristonicus.
- Quintus Mucius Q. f. Q. n. Scaevola, called the augur, consul in 117 BC.
- Mucia Q. f. Q. n., the elder daughter of Quintus Mucius Scaevola, the augur, married Lucius Licinius Crassus, the orator, who was consul in 95 BC, and the colleague of Mucia's cousin, Quintus Mucius Scaevola.
- Tertia Mucia Q. f. Q. n., better known as Mucia Tertia, the younger daughter of the augur, married Gnaeus Pompeius, the triumvir.
- Quintus Mucius P. f. (P. n.) Scaevola, consul in 95 BC and Pontifex Maximus, was murdered at the temple of Vesta by order of the younger Marius.
- Publius Mucius Scaevola, triumvir monetalis in 70 BC, then pontifex from 69. He used the cognomen Cordus on his coins, in order to highlight his descent from the mythical Scaevola.
- Gaius Mucius Scaevola, one of the quindecimviri sacris faciundis in 17 BC.
- Gaius Licinius Mucianus, consul in AD 52, 70, and 75; a general, statesman, orator, and historian praised by Tacitus, he was a strong supporter of Vespasian.

== See also ==
- List of Roman gentes
