= Popillia gens =

Ancient Roman family

The gens Popillia, sometimes written Popilia, was a plebeian family in Rome. The first of the Popillii to obtain the consulship was Marcus Popillius Laenas in 359 BC, only eight years after the lex Licinia Sextia opened that magistracy to the plebeians.

== Origin ==
The nomen Popillius resembles other names ending in -illius and -ellius, which were generally formed directly from cognomina, but perhaps, like Poplius, it should be classified with those ending in -ilus, typically formed from other names and words ending in -ulus, which could, like Popillius, be spelled with either a single or double 'l'. This suggests that the root of the nomen is the Latin word populus, the people.

== Praenomina ==
The chief praenomina of the Popillii were Marcus, Gaius, and Publius, all of which were among the most common names at all periods of Roman history. The other praenomina associated with the Popillii are Titus and Quintus which were also very common.

== Branches and cognomina ==
The only distinct family of the Popillii mentioned during the Republic bore the surname Laenas, cloaked. Cicero describes the incident believed to have given rise to the cognomen: Marcus Popillius, the Flamen Carmentalis, was performing a public sacrifice in his sacerdotal cloak, or laena, when he learned of a riot occasioned by strife between the plebeians and the patrician nobility. He rushed from the sacrifice, still wearing his cloak, hoping to calm the plebeians. His descendants seem not to have shared his disposition; as the historian William Ihne put it, "the family of the Laenates was unfavourably distinguished even among the Romans for their sternness, cruelty, and haughtiness of character." The name is occasionally found as Lenas in some manuscripts of Livy. A number of Popillii are mentioned without a surname, but some of them may have belonged to the same family.

== Members ==
This list includes abbreviated praenomina. For an explanation of this practice, see filiation.

=== Popillii Laenates ===
- Marcus Popillius M. f. C. n. Laenas, consul in 359 BC, said to have been the Flamen Carmentalis who first earned the surname Laenas. He repulsed an attack by the Tiburtines, and in his second consulship in 356, drove them into the refuge of their towns. He was the first plebeian to receive a triumph, after defeating the Gauls during his third consulship, in 350, and was consul for the fourth time in 348.
- Marcus Popillius M. f. M. n. Laenas, consul in 316 BC.
- Publius Popillius P. f. P. n. Laenas, appointed one of the triumvirs to establish a colony near Pisae in Etruria in 180 BC, together with his brother, Marcus, the consul of 173.
- Marcus Popillius P. f. P. n. Laenas, consul in 173 BC, defeated a force of Ligures, destroyed their city, and sold the survivors into slavery, to the consternation of the senate, which ordered him in vain to restore them to liberty. Through the influence of his family, Laenas escaped punishment, and held the censorship in 159. He was also an ambassador sent to Aetolia in 174.
- Gaius Popillius P. f. P. n. Laenas, consul in 172 BC, the first year that both consuls were plebeians. He was subsequently an ambassador to Greece, and intervened in the war between Antiochus and Ptolemy VI by frightening Antiochus with a line drawn in the sand. He was consul for the second time in 158.
- Marcus Popillius M. f. P. n. Laenas, consul in 139, and subsequently proconsul in Spain, where he was defeated by the Numantines.
- Publius Popillius C. f. P. n. Laenas, consul in 132 BC, prosecuted the supporters of Tiberius Gracchus, who had been murdered the previous year. Gaius Gracchus then brought forward a law to punish those who had condemned a Roman citizen without a trial, and Popillius chose to go into exile rather than facing trial himself. He returned following the death of Gracchus.
- Gaius Popillius C. f. C. n. Laenas, whose eloquence is described by Cicero, may be the same Gaius Popillius who was convicted of peculatus (embezzlement).
- Gaius Popillius (Laenas?), legate in Asia, was one of the commanders of the Roman fleet during the First Mithridatic War.
- Publius Popillius Laenas, a partisan of Marius, as tribune of the plebs in 85 BC, condemned his predecessor, Sextus Lucilius, to be hurled from the Tarpeian Rock, and banished the other members of his college.
- Popillius Laenas, a senator whose conversation with Caesar on the Ides of March, 44 BC, made Brutus and the other assassins fear that their conspiracy had been revealed; he appears in Shakespeare's play Julius Caesar as 'Popilius Lena'.
- Gaius Popillius Laenas, a military tribune, executed Cicero on the orders of the triumvirs, and received a prize of one million sestertii more than the agreed amount from Marcus Antonius.

=== Others ===
- Titus Popillius, a Roman legate who participated in the siege of Capua in 211 BC, during the Second Punic War.
- Publius Popillius, one of the ambassadors sent to Syphax, king of Numidia, in 210 BC.
- Gaius Popillius Sabellus, an eques, who fought against the Istri in 178 BC, and was noted for his courage.
- Gaius Popillius C.f., praetor in 133 BC who presided over a meeting of the Senate when it decreed instructions for future governors of Asia to maintain the acts of Attalus III.
- Publius Popillius P. f., a senator in 129 BC.
- Quintus Popillius P. f., a senator in 129 BC. Despite having the same filiation, the two senators of 129 were not directly related, as Quintus belonged to the tribus Romilia and Gaius was from Teretina.
- Popillia, mother of the general and orator Quintus Lutatius Catulus, and, by another husband, of Gaius Julius Caesar Strabo and Lucius Julius Caesar, consul in 90 BC. When she died, her son Catulus gave a funeral oration, mentioned by Cicero as the first occasion that such an honour was paid to a Roman matron.
- Publius Popillius, son of a freedman, whom Cicero describes as having been convicted of bribery, in his oration, Pro Cluentio.
- Titus Popillius, a duumvir of Carthago Nova between 54 and 40 BC.
- Gaius Popilius Carus Pedo, consul suffectus in AD 149, and subsequently governor of several provinces.
- Popilius Pedo Apronianus, consul ordinarius in AD 191, and later proconsul of Asia.
- An unidentified Laenas is mentioned in the Satyricon: a hallway in Trimalchio's house features murals of the Iliad, the Odyssey, and "the gladiatorial games given by Laenas."

== See also ==
- List of Roman gentes

== Bibliography ==
- Polybius, Historiae (The Histories).
- Marcus Tullius Cicero, Brutus, De Oratore, In Verrem, Laelius de Amicitia, Pro Cluentio.
- Titus Livius (Livy), History of Rome.
- Marcus Velleius Paterculus, Compendium of Roman History.
- Valerius Maximus, Factorum ac Dictorum Memorabilium (Memorable Facts and Sayings).
- Sextus Julius Frontinus, Strategemata (Stratagems).
- Plutarchus, Lives of the Noble Greeks and Romans.
- Appianus Alexandrinus (Appian), Bella Celtica (The Gallic Wars), Bella Mithridatica (The Mithridatic Wars), Bellum Civile (The Civil War), Hispanica (The Spanish Wars), Syriaca (The Syrian Wars).
- Aulus Gellius, Noctes Atticae (Attic Nights).
- Nonius Marcellus, De Compendiosa Doctrina (On Collected Knowledge).
- Dictionary of Greek and Roman Biography and Mythology, William Smith, ed., Little, Brown and Company, Boston (1849).
- George Davis Chase, "The Origin of Roman Praenomina", in Harvard Studies in Classical Philology, vol. VIII (1897).
- Robert K. Sherk, "The Text of the Senatus Consultum De Agro Pergameno", in Greek, Roman, and Byzantine Studies, vol. 7, pp. 361–369 (1966).
- Luis Amela Valverde, "Las primeras emisiones (tardo-republicanas) del taller de Carthago Nova. Unas notas", OMNI, n°7, 07–2015.
