= First Servile War =

Ancient Roman slave rebellion (135–132 BCE)

- Part of the Servile Wars
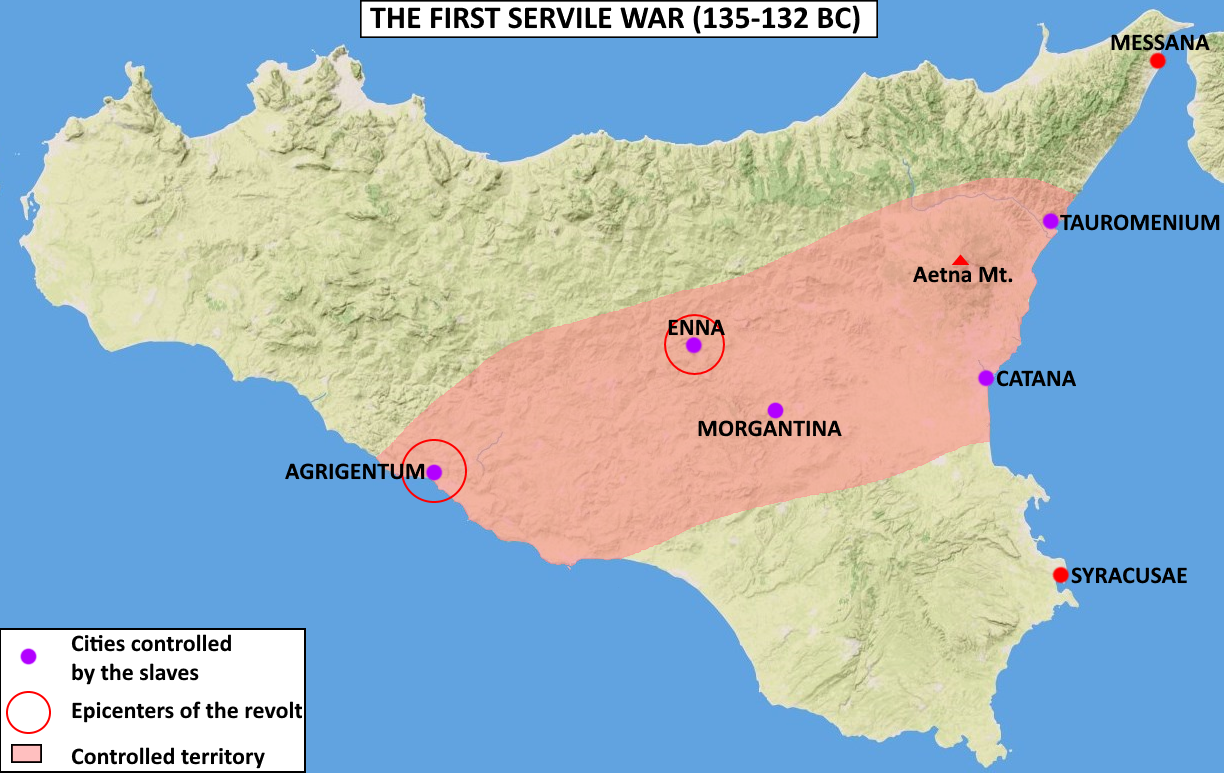
- Maximum territory controlled by the slaves
Date	135–132 BC
Location	Sicily, Achaea
Result	Roman victory

Belligerents
Roman Republic	Slaves of Sicily

Commanders and leaders
L. Cornelius Lentulus (135); L. Plautius Hypsaeus (135); T. Manlius Torquatus (134); C. Fulvius Flaccus (134); T. Manlius Torquatus (134); L. Calpurnius Piso Frugi (133); M. Perperna (133–132); P. Rupilius (132)	Eunus (POW); Cleon †; Comanus †

The First Servile War of 135–132 BC (also known as the First Sicilian Slave War) was a slave rebellion against the Roman Republic, which took place in Sicily. The revolt started in 135 when Eunus, a slave from Syria who claimed to be a prophet, captured the city of Enna in the middle of the island with 400 fellow slaves. Soon after, Cleon, a Cilician slave, stormed the city of Agrigentum on the southern coast, slaughtered the population, and then joined Eunus' army and became his military commander. Eunus even proclaimed himself king, under the name of Antiochus, after the Seleucid emperors of his native Syria.

The former slaves then moved to the eastern coast and took control of Catana and Tauromenium. Their exploit triggered several minor revolts in Italy and as far as Delos in the Aegean Sea. Eunus and Cleon were able to repel several Roman attempts to quell the rebellion until an army commanded by consul Publius Rupilius arrived in Sicily in 134 and besieged the cities controlled by the slaves. The revolt ended in 132 with the fall of Enna and Tauromenium.

== Origins ==
Following the final expulsion of the Carthaginians during the Second Punic War, there were great changes in land ownership in Sicily. Speculators from Italy rushed onto the island, buying up large tracts of land at low prices, or occupied estates which had belonged to Sicilians of the Carthaginian party. These were forfeited to Rome after the execution or flight of their owners.

The newly arrived Roman Sicilians exploited their slaves more brutally than their predecessors. According to Diodorus Siculus, politically influential slave-owners, often Roman equites, did not provide enough food and clothing for their slaves. The Roman conquest of Macedonia, in which thousands of the conquered were sold into slavery, the slave-dealing of the Cretan and Cilician pirates whose activity was practically unchecked at this time, as well as the oppression of corrupt Roman provincial governors, who were known to organize man-hunts after lower-class country provincials (to be sold as slaves)—all contributed to a constant supply of new slaves at very cheap price, which made it more profitable for their masters to wear them out by unremitting labor, harshness, exposure and malnutrition, to be cheaply replaced, than to take proper care for their nourishment, health, and accommodation. Accordingly, the plantation system which took shape in Sicily led to thousands of slaves dying every year of toil in the fields from dawn to dusk with chains around their legs, and being locked up in suffocating subterranean pits by night. For food, the slaves had to turn to banditry to survive. The Roman Senate failed to take measures to curb this dangerous tendency, which converted one of the most beautiful and fertile provinces of the Republic into a horrible den of misery, brigandage, atrocity and death.

== Servile War ==
In 135 BC, the plantation slaves in Sicily finally rose in revolt, having as their head a certain Eunus of Syrian origin, who, as a conjurer and self-proclaimed prophet, had long foretold that he would be king. Recognizing his talents, his plantation master used to employ him as an entertainer at symposia, where he would perform sleight-of-hand magic tricks that included breathing fire. During the performance he kept up a patter—thought humorous by his listeners—saying that Sicilian society would experience a role-reversal, in which his aristocratic audience would be killed or enslaved, and he would become king. To those who gave him tips, Eunus promised that they would be spared once he came into his kingdom. During the revolt, he spared the lives of at least some of those individuals.

The spark which would end up starting the revolt came when a group of slaves, who were suffering under the severe cruelty of their owner Damophilus, sought out Eunus for advice on what to do about their situation. Declaring that his prophecy was now to be fulfilled, Eunus organized about 400 slaves into a band and stormed the prominent city of Enna located in the interior of the island and the home of Damophilus. The unprepared town was captured and sacked by the insurgents, who executed every inhabitant but the iron-forgers, who were chained to their smithies and put to manufacturing arms for their captors. Damophilus was butchered after being insultingly paraded through the local theater, abjectly begging for his life while his wife was tortured to death by her servants. Their daughter, who had once attempted to alleviate the suffering of her family's slaves, was spared by the rebels and given an honorable escort which was to deliver her to Catana.

Upon the capture of Enna, Eunus crowned himself king and subsequently took the name Antiochus, a name used by the Seleucids who ruled his homeland Syria, and he called his followers, who numbered in the tens of thousands, Syrians. After the capture of Enna, the revolt quickly spread. Achaeus, a Greek slave, was named commander-in-chief by Eunus, who simultaneously proclaimed himself king Antiochus, of Syria. A group of 5,000 slaves on the south side of the island under Cleon rose up and captured Agrigentum, after which they joined Eunus and his forces. The numbers of the slave army swelled rapidly from 10,000 to 70,000 by the lowest number (Livy and Orosius following him), or as many as 200,000 according to Diodorus Siculus, including men and women, possibly counting children as well.

The Praetor Lucius Hypsaeus marched with a body of Sicilian militia to quash the revolt but the slaves routed his army. They then defeated three other praetors in succession and occupied almost the whole island by the end of the year. In 134 the Roman Senate sent Flaccus, the consul for the year, to put an end to the revolt. However, his campaign, the details of which are few and obscure, seems to have ended without a conclusive result. A year later, in 133 the new consul Lucius Calpurnius Piso was given the same task as Flaccus but this time the effort actually gave results. He recaptured Messana and put 8,000 surrendered slaves to death before laying siege to the important town of Tauromenium on the north-east coast, although he was unable to take it. The revolt was finally snuffed out in its entirety the following year by Publius Rupilius. He also laid siege to Tauromenium and captured it with relative ease thanks to the help of traitors from within the slave army defending the town. All the prisoners taken when the town fell were first tortured and then thrown from a cliff. Next he marched on Enna, which had become the center of the entire revolt, where one of the slave leaders, Cleon, had taken refuge. Cleon in turn died of wounds sustained during a desperate sally out of the gates to try to break the Roman siege lines. Enna fell not long after, again helped by traitors inside the walls. The remnants of the slave army on the rest of the island were quickly stamped out, with around 20,000 prisoners being crucified by Rupilius in retribution.

As for Eunus, little is known about his actual participation in the war. Only his enemies left accounts of him, and they gave credit for his victories to his general Cleon. But Eunus must have been a man of considerable ability to have maintained his leadership position throughout the war and to have commanded the services of those said to have been his superiors. Eunus was captured after Tauromenium fell and was found hiding in a pit. He was taken to the city of Morgantina to await punishment, but he died of disease before he could be judged.

The war lasted from 135 until 132 BC. It was the first of three large-scale slave revolts against the Roman Republic; the last and the most famous was led by Spartacus.
