= Eunus =

Syrian wonderworker and king who led a slave revolt

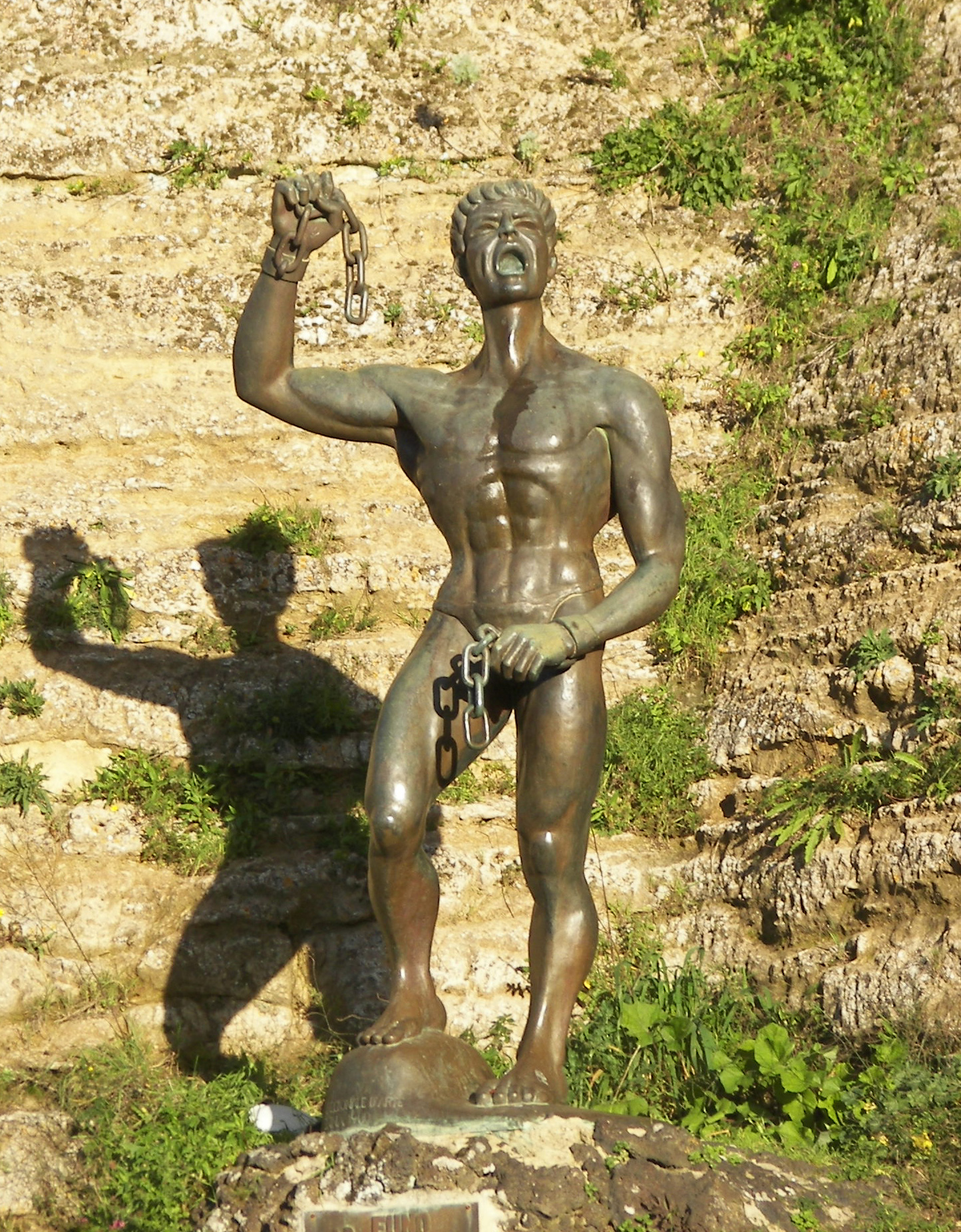
- Statue of Eunus in Enna, Sicily.

King of Enna
- Reign: c. 135 – 132 BC
- Coronation: c. 135 BC
- Died: 132 BC
Regnal name
- Antiochus

Eunus (died 132 BC) was a Roman slave from Apamea in Syria who became the leader and king of the slave uprising during the First Servile War (135 BC–132 BC) in the Roman province of Sicily. According to the historian Florus, his name is remembered due to the severe defeats he inflicted on the Romans.

Eunus rose to prominence in the movement through his reputation as a prophet and wonder-worker and ultimately declared himself king. He claimed to receive visions and communications from the goddess Atargatis, a prominent goddess in his homeland whom he identified with the Sicilian Demeter and the Roman Ceres.

Some of Eunus' prophecies, namely that the rebel slaves would successfully capture the city of Enna and that he would be a king some day, came true. Eunus and his revolt were successful for several years, repeatedly defeating praetorian armies and requiring consuls from 134–132 BC to be sent against him. He was eventually defeated, dying in captivity in 132 BC.

== Sources ==
Most of the literary evidence for Eunus and the First Servile War comes from the writings of Diodorus Siculus, who used Posidonius as his primary source. Florus' Epitome, which provides excerpts from lost portions of Livy, is the most detailed account in Latin.

Diodorus, Posidonius, and especially Florus were anti-slave and thus sympathetic to the Romans. Since Eunus was a defeated enemy of Rome, their accounts of both the slave uprising and its leader were likely biased. Morton notes that ancient sources refer to him as "Eunus" while numismatic evidence suggests he called himself, and wanted his subjects to refer to him as, King Antiochus. Broadly, the negativity of the sources means "it is difficult to say anything definitive about [Eunus]".

Like Eunus, Posidonius was from the Syrian town of Apamea. He likely based his details about Eunus' worship of Atargatis in his personal knowledge of the goddess's priests. Despite all existing sources being negative, Urbainczyk notes that "the sources attributed to [Eunus] all the powers, abilities, wisdom, and cunning that challenges to the status quo had to have in order to succeed". However, Posidonius' writings are not to be taken at face-value, for as historian Philip Freeman puts it: "Posidonius was Greek to the core" and did not expressed any love for his native city in his writings but mocked its inhabitants.

== Biography ==
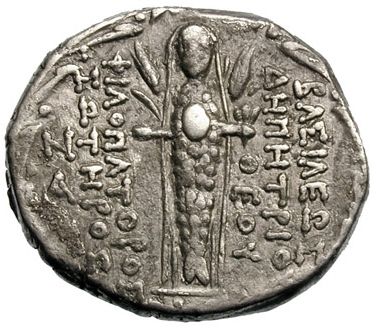
The reverse of a tetradrachm minted by Demetrius III, a Seleucid King of Syria, roughly 40–50 years after Eunus' death. It depicts a fish-bodied Atargatis, the goddess whom Eunus claimed to be a consort of.

Eunus' life prior to slavery is not known, besides the fact that he was born in Apamea, Syria. He was probably trafficked by pirates to Sicily, eventually being sold by his previous owner Pytho to a Greek man of Enna named Antigenes.

As a household slave with a wife, Eunus was in a privileged position compared to other slaves in Sicily. Eunus was reputed in Enna to be an oracle who received visions from the gods when he was both awake and asleep. He was so well regarded for this that Antigenes would introduce him to his guests to divine their fortune.

He also blew fire from his mouth during his oracular trances, which he held as proof of his supernatural powers. However, Florus (writing his account centuries later) identified it as a fire eating act. According to him, Eunus hid a small, perforated nutshell containing burning material on his mouth, which he would blow through to emit fire and sparks while in a trance.

In one of these trances, Eunus claimed to have received a dream that he would one day become a king, and told his master Antigenes; Antigenes found this amusing and had him mention this at a banquet to guests. The guests asked Eunus how he would run his kingdom, and after Eunus answered at length gave him some meat and asked him "to remember their kindness when he came to be king". After he became king, Eunus is said to have spared these guests, and the daughter of Antigenes who had always treated the slaves kindly, while killing Antigenes, Pytho, and many other slaveowners.

=== First Servile War ===
Eunus was approached, maybe as early as 138 BC, by disgruntled slaves who were planning a revolt due to their mistreatment at the hands of a slaveowner named Damophilus; they asked him whether their revolt had divine approval. Eunus approved, and prophesized the fall of Enna to the rebel slaves.

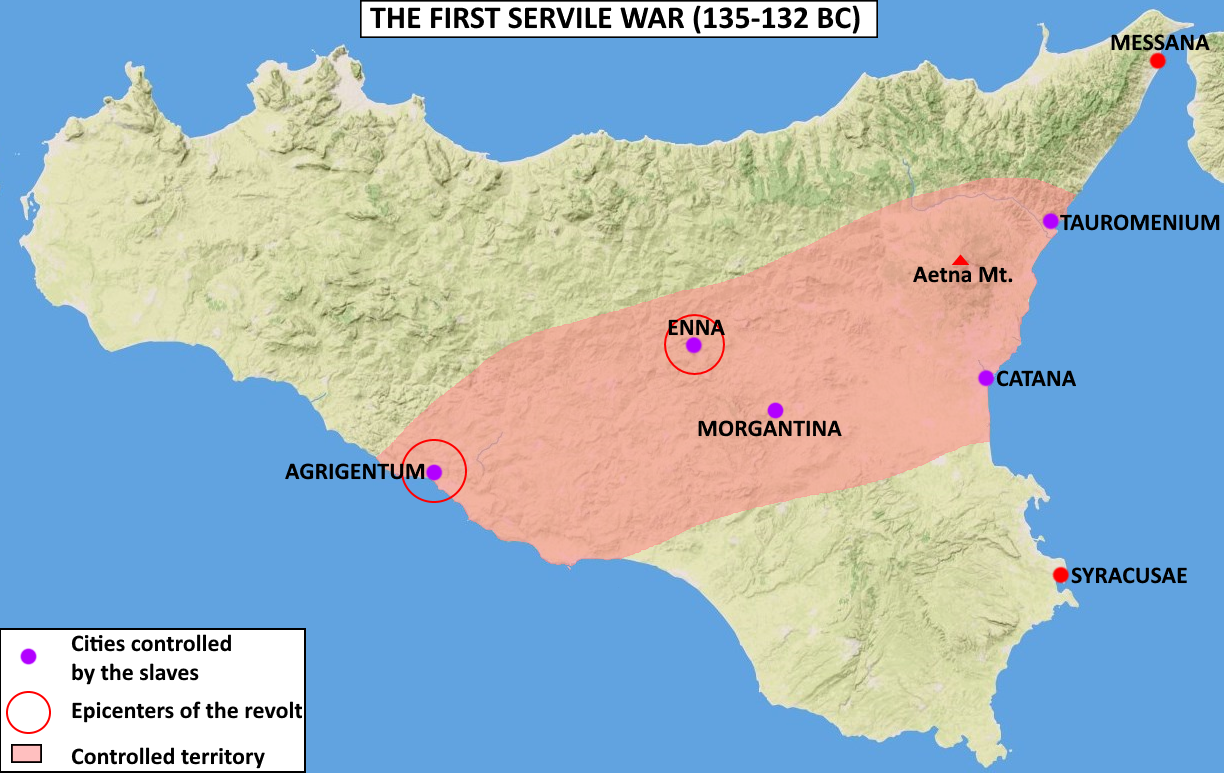
The maximum territory controlled by the slaves under Eunus during the First Servile War.

Early in the spring of 135 BC, the slaves, numbering 400, took Enna in a midnight attack, probably with internal help from the city. Eunus participated: Diodorus describes him standing in the front ranks of the assault, blowing fire from his mouth. After the capture of the city and slaughter of many of its inhabitants and slaveowners, Eunus crowned himself king, wearing a diadem, and subsequently took the name Antiochus, a name used by the Seleucids who ruled his homeland Syria. Eunus' ascension, following a military victory, mirrors the traditional acclamation of Hellenistic Kings by their armies.

During the slaughter of the inhabitants of Enna, Eunus allowed citizens who could aid his war effort, such as blacksmiths, to live. He soon raised an army of 6,000 slaves, took on bodyguards and personal servants, and formed a council of advisors. Eunus also called his followers, who numbered in the tens of thousands, Syrians, and had his wife named queen. Diodorus reports scornfully that Eunus was chosen as king by the slaves not for his courage, but for his skill in wonderworking and role in initiating the revolt. Eunus' name, meaning "the Benevolent one" apparently also influenced the slaves into choosing him as their leader.

Damophilus was killed by Eunus' subordinates. When one of Eunus' followers, a man named Achaeus, protested the excessive killings of slaveowners, Eunus, remarkably, welcomed the advice and promoted him to the ruling council of his new kingdom.

=== Rule over Sicily ===
Eunus organized the slaves and seems to have attempted to build a state independent of Rome, a "Seleucid Kingdom of the West which would recall the great days of Antiochus III", minting his own coins, entrenching his rule, and evolving a command and supply structure capable of sustaining his forces in the field for long periods. This is thought to explain how Eunus' armies were repeatedly successful against the Romans. The sanctuary of Demeter in Enna provided Eunus' revolt a religious and anti-Roman aspect, something probably intentionally mirrored in his coinage. Green believes it is significant that Eunus based his rule on the Seleucid monarchy of Syria, and that he may have been a descendant or bastard of the Seleucid house. In any case, "That he [Eunus] believed in his own kingship seems certain: a calculating charlatan seldom gets the hold over men which Eunus quite clearly did".

Enna was the capital of Eunus' slave kingdom. When the slave revolt was growing, he did not allow his followers to pillage farmhouses and fields, knowing the necessity of provisions for his war effort. A small bronze coin, minted at Enna, bears the inscription "King Antiochus", this being likely Eunus. His armies took several other cities in central and eastern Sicily, including Tauromenium. During the siege of one of these cities, Eunus staged a re-enactment of the slave revolt's seizure of Enna and killing of slaveowners outside of bowshot, probably intending to mock the Romans and raise rebellious sentiments in the town.

When another slave named Cleon revolted on the other side of Sicily, the Romans hoped the two slave armies would destroy each other. Instead, Cleon became a subject of Eunus and served him thereafter. Cleon may have communicated with Eunus long before they joined forces and even attacked Agrigentum on his order, though he is typically held to have revolted independently after being inspired by Eunus' success.

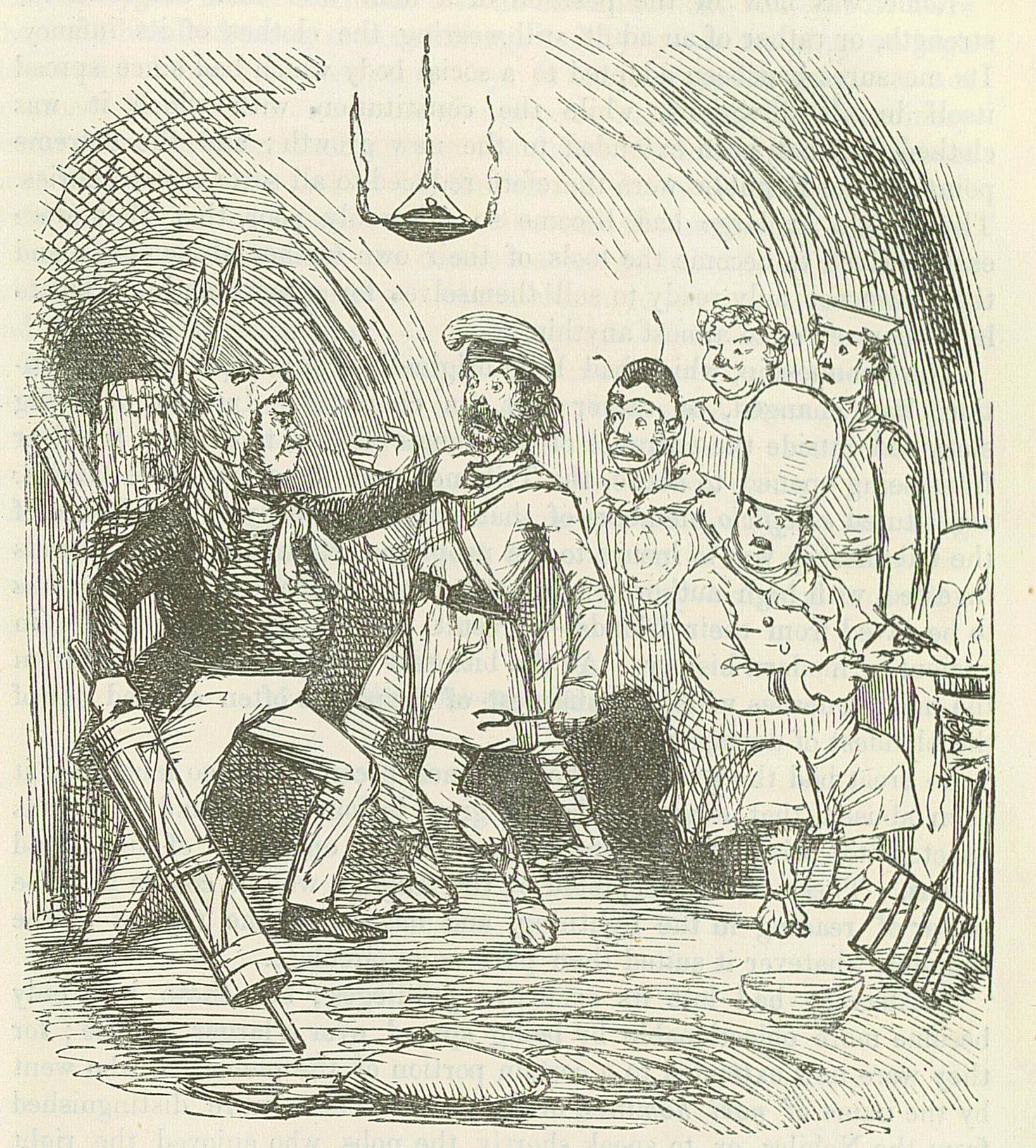
Anachronistic 19th century depiction of Eunus' capture.

It is unclear how much of Sicily came under Eunus' control, however; Agrigentum, Enna, Tauromenium were certainly taken, Catana as well, and Morgantina. Eunus' kingdom was largely focused in eastern Sicily, and encompassed roughly half of the island at its greatest extent. By 134 BC, consuls had begun being sent against Eunus. Eunus' success inspired slave revolts across the Mediterranean, and his army grew to number in the tens of thousands. Ancient sources report exaggerated figures of 70,000 or even 200,000.

Eunus was successful in defeating Roman forces sent against him for several years through "strong and vigorous leadership". The character of the war, preserved by ancient sources and suggested by its length, indicates it was hard-fought. However, after his armies were defeated by the Romans under the leadership of Marcus Perperna and Publius Rupilius in 132 BC, Eunus was besieged at Enna. He fought his way out of the city with a bodyguard of 1,000, and eventually took refuge in a cavern with members of his court, where he was subsequently captured. He was sent to prison, where he died of illness before he could be punished. Eunus may have been kept in prison rather than crucified out of fear of creating a martyr.

== Significance and legacy ==
Eunus' revolt was the first mass slave uprising in the Roman Republic, and, according to ancient sources, the largest of its kind in antiquity. Eunus' revolt inspired slave uprisings in Rome and Italy, which later slave leaders, including Spartacus in the Third Servile War, were unable to replicate. Salvius Tryphon of the Second Servile War followed Eunus' example by declaring himself king in the Seleucid fashion, though he "never seems to have become as charismatic a figure as the wonderworker Eunus before him".

Eunus was held as an example of the threat slaves could pose to Roman society even in the times of the late Roman Empire.

Morton believes that the strategy employed by Eunus in the First Servile War was sound, systematic, and suited to the land (attacking supply lines and conquering important cities) contrasting the less focused, scattered fighting of the Second Servile War. This, in turn, merited a greater and more rapid response from Rome to the actions of Eunus than those of Salvius. Due to the lack of precise knowledge of when Eunus' revolt began, it has been speculated his actions may have been somewhat responsible for "actual or feared" grain shortages in Rome, which in turn influenced the legislative programs pursued by both Tiberius and Gaius Gracchus.

There is no evidence to suggest that Eunus sought a widespread repealing of slavery across all of the Roman Republic. Rather, Eunus and his associates "had nothing against slavery as an institution, but objected violently to being enslaved themselves". Green concludes that it is ironic Eunus chose two traditionally counter-revolutionary systems, religion and kingship, as bases of his revolt, but that "The tragedy and moral of the whole episode is that no conceivable alternative existed".

== Bibliography ==
=== Ancient sources ===
- Orosius, Paulus (1936) [5th century AD]. Histories against the Pagans [Seven books of history against the pagans: the apology of Paulus Orosius]. Translated by Raymond, I. W. – via Attalus.org.
- Diodorus. Library of History. Translated by Booth, G.; Hoefer, F. – via Attalus.org.
- Florus (1929). Epitome of Roman History. Loeb Classical Library. Translated by Forster, E. S. – via LacusCurtius.
- Livy (2003). Periochae. Translated by Lendering, Jona – via Livius.org.

=== Modern sources ===
- Bradley, Keith R. (1983). "Slave Kingdoms and Slave Rebellions in Ancient Sicily". Réflexions Historiques. 10 (3): 435–451. JSTOR 41292832.
- Bradley, Keith R. (1989). Slavery and Rebellion in the Roman World. Indiana University Press. ISBN 9780253211699.
- Brennan, T. Corey (1993). "The Commanders in the First Sicilian Slave War". Rivista di Filologia e di Istruzione Classica. 121. Rutgers University Libraries: 153–184.
- Donaldson, Adam E. (2012). Peasant and Slave Rebellion in the Roman Republic (PDF) (Doctor of Philosophy thesis). University of Arizona.
- Engels, David (2011). "Ein syrisches Sizilien? Seleukidische Aspekte des Ersten Sizilischen Sklavenkriegs und der Herrschaft des Eunus-Antiochos" [A Syrian Sicily? Seleucid Aspects of the First Sicilian Slave War and the Reign of Eunus-Antiochus]. Polifemo (in German). 11: 233–251.
- Forbes, Christopher (1995). Prophecy and Inspired Speech in Early Christianity and Its Hellenistic Environment. Tübingen: Mohr. ISBN 3-16-146223-8.
- Green, Peter (1961). "The First Sicilian Slave War". Past and Present Society: Oxford Journals. 20 (20): 10–29. doi:10.1093/past/20.1.10. JSTOR 650133.
- Hoover, Oliver D. (2012). Handbook of Coins of Sicily (including Lipara): Civic, Royal, Siculo-Punic, and Romano-Sicilian Issues, Sixth to First Centuries BC. The Handbook of Greek Coinage Series. Vol. 2. Lancaster, PA: Classical Numismatic Group. ISBN 978-0980238792.
- Morton, Peter (2008). Rebels and Slaves: Reinterpreting the First Sicilian Slave War (MSc by Research in Ancient History thesis). University of Edinburgh.
- Morton, Peter (2013). "Eunus: The Cowardly King". The Classical Quarterly. 63 (1). Cambridge University Press (Online): 237–252. doi:10.1017/S0009838812000778. hdl:20.500.11820/b42e3d4c-85a1-4aa4-b74d-7262574f0a65 – via Cambridge.org.
- Morton, Peter (2014). "The Geography of Rebellion: Strategy and Supply in the Two 'Sicilian Slave Wars'". Bulletin of the Institute of Classical Studies. 57 (1): 20–38. doi:10.1111/j.2041-5370.2014.00063.x. JSTOR 26343125.
- Nickell, Joe (2005). Secrets of the Sideshows. Lexington, KY: University Press of Kentucky. p. 209. ISBN 9780813171791.
- Robinson, E.S.G. (1920). "Antiochus, King of the Slaves". The Numismatic Chronicle and Journal of the Royal Numismatic Society. 20 (4). Royal Numismatic Society: 175–176. JSTOR 42663794.
- Urbainczyk, Theresa (2014). Slave Revolts in Antiquity. New York: Routledge. ISBN 978-1-84465-101-6.
