= Milesian tale =

Genre of classical Greek and Roman fiction

The Milesian tale (Greek: Μιλησιακά, Milesiaka; Latin:fabula milesiaca, or Milesiae fabula) is a genre of fictional story prominent in ancient Greek and Roman literature. According to most authorities, a Milesian tale is a short story, fable, or folktale featuring love and adventure, usually of an erotic or titillating nature.

This resulted in "a complicated narrative fabric: a travelogue carried by a main narrator with numerous subordinate tales carried by subordinate narrative voices". The best complete example of this would be Apuleius's The Golden Ass, a Roman novel written in the second century of the Common Era. Apuleius introduces his novel with the words "At ego tibi sermone isto Milesio varias fabulas conseram" ("But let me join together different stories in that Milesian style"), which suggests not each story is a Milesian tale, but rather the entire joined-together collection. The idea of the Milesian tale also served as a model for the episodic narratives strung together in Petronius's Satyricon.

== Aristides's Milesian Tale ==
The name Milesian tale originates from the Milesiaka of Aristides of Miletus (Greek: Ἀριστείδης ὁ Μιλήσιος; fl. 2nd century BCE), who was a writer of shameless and amusing tales notable for their salacious content and unexpected plot twists. Aristides set his tales in Miletus, which had a reputation for a luxurious, easy-going lifestyle, akin to that of Sybaris in Magna Graecia; there is no reason to think that he was in any sense "of" Miletus himself.

Later, in the first century BCE, the serious-minded historian Lucius Cornelius Sisenna translated Aristides into Latin under the title Milesiae fabulae (Milesian Fables) for an intellectual relaxation. Through this Latin translation of the work, the term "Milesian tale" gained currency in the ancient world. Milesian tales quickly gained a reputation for ribaldry: Ovid, in Tristia, contrasts the boldness of Aristides and others with his own Ars Amatoria, for which he was punished by exile. In the dialogue on the kinds of love, Erotes, Lucian of Samosata—if in fact he was the author—praised Aristides in passing, saying that after a day of listening to erotic stories he felt like Aristides, "that enchanting spinner of bawdy yarns". This suggests that the lost Milesiaka had for its framing device Aristides himself, retelling what he had been hearing of the goings-on at Miletus.

Plutarch, in his Life of Crassus, notes that after the Battle of Carrhae in 53 BCE, the victorious Parthians found collections of Milesian tales in the baggage of the Roman prisoners.

== Legacy ==
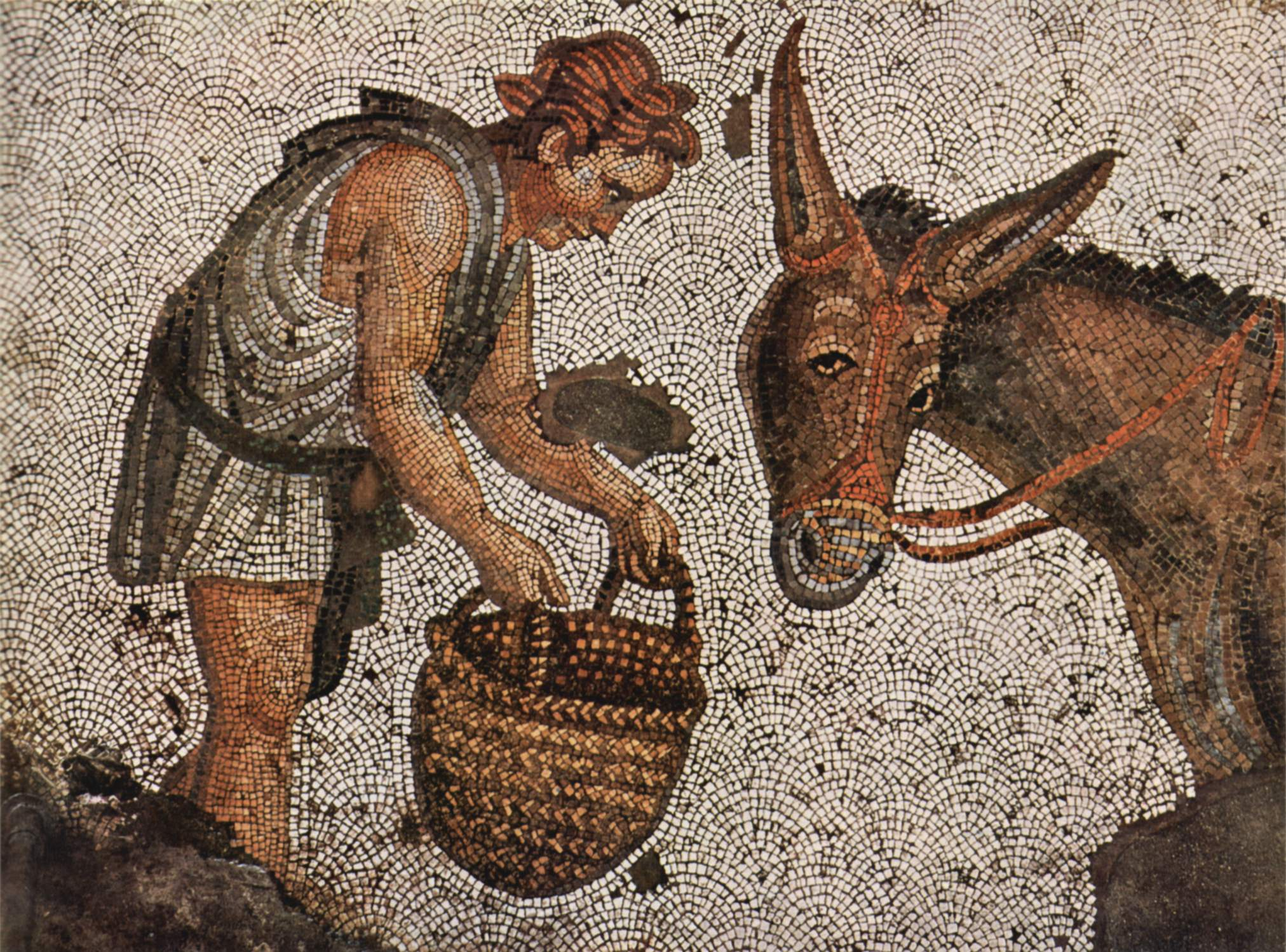
A Byzantine mosaic depicting a scene from The Golden Ass by Lucius Apuleius

Though the idea of the Milesian tale served as a model for the episodic narratives strung together in The Satyricon by Gaius Petronius Arbiter and The Golden Ass by Lucius Apuleius (second century CE), neither Aristides's original Greek text nor the Latin translation survived. The lengthiest survivor from this literature is the tale of "Cupid and Psyche", found in Apuleius, which Sir Richard Burton observed, "makes us deeply regret the disappearance of the others".

Aristidean saucy and disreputable heroes and spicy, fast-paced anecdote resurfaced in the medieval fabliaux. Chaucer's "The Miller's Tale" is in Aristides' tradition.

M. C. Howatson, in The Oxford Companion to Classical Literature (1989), voiced the traditional view the Milesian tale is the source "of such medieval collections of tales as the Gesta Romanorum, the Decameron of Boccaccio, and the Heptaméron of Marguerite of Navarre".

Gottskálk Jensson of the University of Copenhagen, Denmark, however, offered a dissenting view or corrective, arguing the original Milesian tale was: "a type of first-person novel, a travelogue told from memory by a narrator who every now and then would relate how he encountered other characters who told him stories which he would then incorporate into the main tale through the rhetorical technique of narrative impersonation".

In 2010, Nicholas Chong published retold Milesian tales in his book "The Milesian and Malesian Tales", in which he mentions an Arcadian human sacrifice.
