= Crassus (disambiguation) =

Crassus usually refers to Marcus Licinius Crassus (115–53 BC), one of the members of the First Triumvirate of the Roman Republic.

Crassus may also refer to:

== People ==
=== Ancient Romans ===
- Lucius Licinius Crassus, Roman orator
- Marcus Licinius Crassus (disambiguation), Romans
- Publius Licinius Crassus (disambiguation), Romans
- Publius Canidius Crassus
- Appius Claudius Crassus
- Titus Otacilius Crassus

=== Others ===
- Petrus Crassus, the 11th-century jurist
- William Crassus, the 13th-century Anglo-Norman

== Zoology ==
- Battus crassus
- Anguillicoloides crassus
- Pseudophoxinus crassus
- Hoplobatrachus crassus
- Turbo crassus
- Onobops crassus
- Neolamprologus crassus
- Zabrus crassus
- Elaphropus crassus
- Copelatus crassus
- Crassus, a species name
