= Lucius Licinius Lucullus =

Lucius Licinius Lucullus was the name used by men of gens Licinia in Ancient Rome. They came from the Licinii Luculli, in which the most famous member was the consul in 74 BC and conqueror of Mithridates VI of Pontus.

- Lucius Licinius Lucullus (aedile 202 BC), great-grandfather of the famous conqueror
- Lucius Licinius Lucullus (consul 151 BC), grandfather of the famous conqueror
- Lucius Licinius Lucullus (praetor 104 BC), father of the famous conqueror
- Lucullus (Lucius Licinius Lucullus), consul 74 BC and the general in the Third Mithridatic War
- Lucius Licinius Lucullus (praetor 67 BC)
- Lucullus the Younger (Lucius Licinius Lucullus), son of the famous conqueror.

== See also ==
- Licinia gens
- Licinius Lucullus, a list for men of the family Licinii Luculli
- Lucullus (disambiguation)
