= Licinius (disambiguation) =

Licinius was Roman emperor from 308 to 324. The name may also refer to:

- Licinius Crassus (disambiguation)
  - Marcus Licinius Crassus, triumvir
- Licinius Macer, Roman historian
- Lucullus (Lucius Licinius Lucullus), Roman general
- Licinia gens, whose male members were known as Licinius

== See also ==
- Licinus (disambiguation)
