= Aquillia gens =

Ancient Roman family

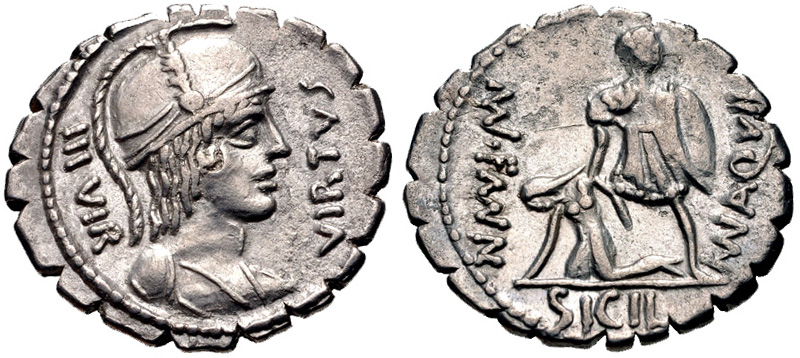
Denarius of Manius Aquillius, 65 BC. On the obverse is Virtus. The reverse depicts the consul Manius Aquillius raising an allegory of Sicily, an allusion to his victory in the Second Servile War.

The gens Aquillia or Aquilia was a plebeian family of great antiquity at ancient Rome. Two of the Aquillii are mentioned among the Roman nobles who conspired to bring back the Tarquins, and a member of the house, Gaius Aquillius Tuscus, was consul in 487 BC.

== Origin ==
The nomen Aquilius or Aquillius is probably derived from aquila, an eagle. On coins and inscriptions the name is almost always written Aquillius, but in manuscripts generally with a single l. The oldest branch of the family bore the cognomen Tuscus, suggesting that the gens may have been of Etruscan origin, although the nomen of the gens is indisputably Latin, and the name Tuscus could have been acquired in other ways. This cognomen is nonetheless dubious as only found in late sources; Robert Broughton mentions that it could have also been Sabinus.

From the imagery of their coins, it seems that the Aquillii had a special devotion for Sol, a rare occurrence under the Republic.

== Praenomina ==
The oldest families of the Aquillii bore the praenomina Gaius, Lucius, and Marcus, which were the three most common names at all periods of Roman history. However, one family, which rose to considerable prominence in the final century of the Republic, preferred the less-common praenomen Manius.

== Branches and cognomina ==
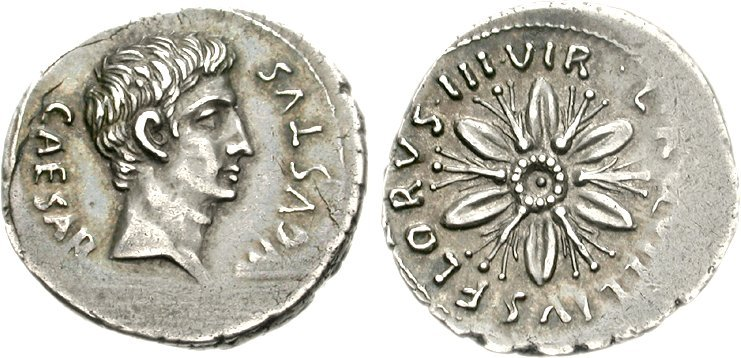
Denarius of Augustus and Lucius Aquillius Florus, 19 BC. Augustus is portrayed on the obverse. The flower on the reverse alludes to Florus' name.

The cognomina of the Aquillii under the Republic are Corvus, Crassus, Florus, Gallus, and Tuscus.

Tuscus, the oldest surname of the gens, means "Etruscan", and this branch of the family is thought by some writers to have been patrician, since they were among the Roman nobility at the beginning of the Republic, and according to tradition, the consulship was closed to the plebeians until the lex Licinia Sextia of 367 BC. However, modern scholarship suggests that the nobility of the Roman monarchy was not exclusively patrician, and that a number of early consuls belonged to families that were later regarded as plebeian. Still, as most patrician gentes also had plebeian branches, the possibility that some of the early Aquilii were patricians cannot be discounted.

Corvus refers to a raven. This surname is more famous from the gens Valeria. The Aquillii Flori first appear during the First Punic War, although they must have existed since the fourth century BC, and flourished at least until the time of Augustus. Their name simply means "flower". Gallus may refer to a cock, or to a Gaul, even though the Galli were from Lanuvium. Crassus, a surname common in many gentes, may be translated as "thick," "dull," "simple," or "crude." The last cognomen to appear was Felix, meaning "lucky".

In the last century of the Republic, two Aquillii who reached the consulship are not recorded with a cognomen, but they belonged to the Flori, since this cognomen is found on coins and inscriptions of their descendants.

== Members ==
This list includes abbreviated praenomina. For an explanation of this practice, see filiation.

=== Early Aquillii ===
- Gaius Aquillius Tuscus, consul in 487 BC, carried on war against the Hernici, and received an Ovation.
- Lucius Aquillius Corvus, tribunus militum consulari potestate in 388 BC.

=== Aquillii Flori ===
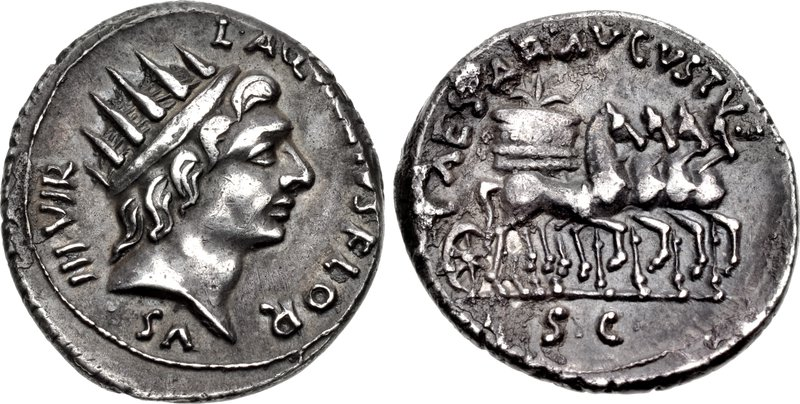
Denarius of Augustus and Lucius Aquillius Florus, 19 BC. Sol is portrayed on the obverse. The reverse shows a quadriga carrying a modius, a reference to corn distributions made by Augustus.

- Gaius Aquillius Florus, grandfather of the consul of 259 BC.
- Marcus Aquillius Florus, father of the consul of 259 BC.
- Gaius Aquillius M. f. C. n. Florus, consul in 259 BC, the sixth year of the First Punic War. He was sent in Sicily, where he stayed as proconsul the following year. He celebrated a triumph at his return to Rome.
- Manius Aquillius M'. f. M'. n., consul in 129 BC, and proconsul in Asia until 126, which he organised as province.
- Manius Aquillius M'. f. M'. n., triumvir monetalis in 109 or 108 BC, praetor by 104, legate in Gaul in 103, consul and proconsul in Sicily in 101–99, where he defeated the revolted slaves of Salvius Tryphon. Ambassador in Bythinia in 89, he was then captured and put to death by Mithradates in 88 BC.
- Manius Aquillius M'. f. M'. n., senator and juror in the trial of Oppianicus in 74 BC
- Manius Aquillius M'. f. M'. n, triumvir monetalis in 65 BC. (Note: Initially, Crawford dated this moneyer from 71 BC, and supposed that he was the same as the senator mentioned in 74. However, Walker and Hersh placed him later, in 65. Thus, the moneyer was most likely the son of the senator, as moneyers were typically young men in their 20s, whereas the senator would have been at least 39 by this time. He was possibly the same as the supporter of Antony.)
- Aquillius Florus, a supporter Marcus Antonius. Caught by Octavian, he committed suicide after his son was executed before him.
- Aquillius Florus, supported Marcus Antonius alongside his father, with whom he was killed by Octavian.
- Lucius Aquillius M'. f. M'. n. Florus, quaestor in Asia in the late Republic, where he repaired the roads built by his ancestor, the consul of 129 BC.
- Lucius Aquillius L. f. M'. n. Florus, triumvir monetalis in 19 BC.
- Lucius Aquillius C. f. Florus Turcianus Gallus, governor of Achaia circa AD 52, had been decemvir stlitibus judicandis, tribune of the Legio VIII Macedonicae, quaestor, proquaestor in Cyprus, tribune of the plebs, and praetor.

=== Aquillii Galli ===
- Lucius Aquillius Gallus, praetor in 176 BC, obtained Sicily for his province.
- Gaius Aquilius Gallus, praetor in 66 BC, an early jurist, and pupil of Quintus Mucius Scaevola.
- Publius Aquillius Gallus, tribune of the plebs in 55 BC, he tried to oppose the Lex Trebonia which granted a proconsulship of five years to Crassus and Pompey.
- Lucius Aquillius C. f. Florus Turcianus Gallus, a senator under Augustus. His name indicates a possible alliance between the Aquillii Flori and Galli.

=== Others ===
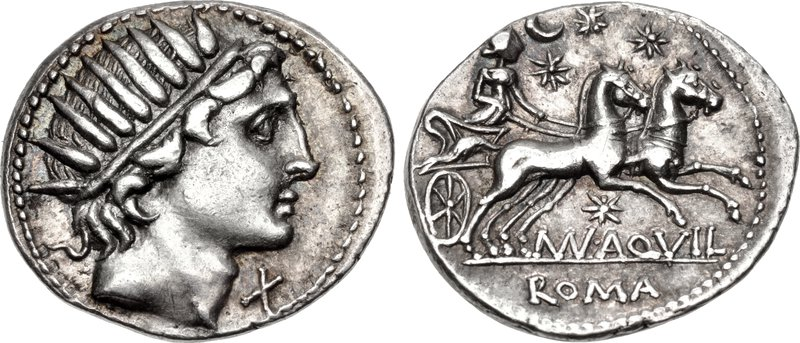
Denarius of Manius Aquillius, 109-108 BC. On the obverse is the head of Sol, while the reverse depicts Luna driving a biga with stars around.

- Aquillius, a tribune of the plebs, and author of the Lex Aquillia, possibly dated from 286 BC.
- Publius Aquillius, tribune of the plebs in 211 BC, although the date is disputed.
- Publius Aquillius, legate in 210 BC.
- Aquillia, reportedly engaged to marry Quintus Tullius Cicero circa 44 BC.
- Marcus Aquillius Crassus, praetor in 43 BC, sent by the Senate to oppose Octavianus, and later proscribed. Perhaps the same as Acilius, also proscribed, whose escape is related by Appian.
- Aquillius Niger, a writer referred to by Suetonius for a statement about the death of the consul Hirtius.
- Lucius Aquillius L. f. Regulus, quaestor of Tiberius, and later pontifex.
- Marcus Aquillius Julianus, consul in AD 38.
- Marcus Aquillius Regulus, one of the delatores, or informers, in the time of Nero, and again under Domitian.
- Gaius Aquillius Proculus, consul suffectus for July and August, AD 90.
- Quintus Aquillius Niger, consul in AD 117.
- Marcus Aquillius M. f. Felix, a centurion primus pilus of the Legio XI Claudia in 193, he was ordered by Didius Julianus to murder Septimius Severus, but defected to him instead. He was rewarded by several senior positions in the administration of Severus.
- Aquillius Severus, a minor poet from Hispania during the time of Valentinian I.

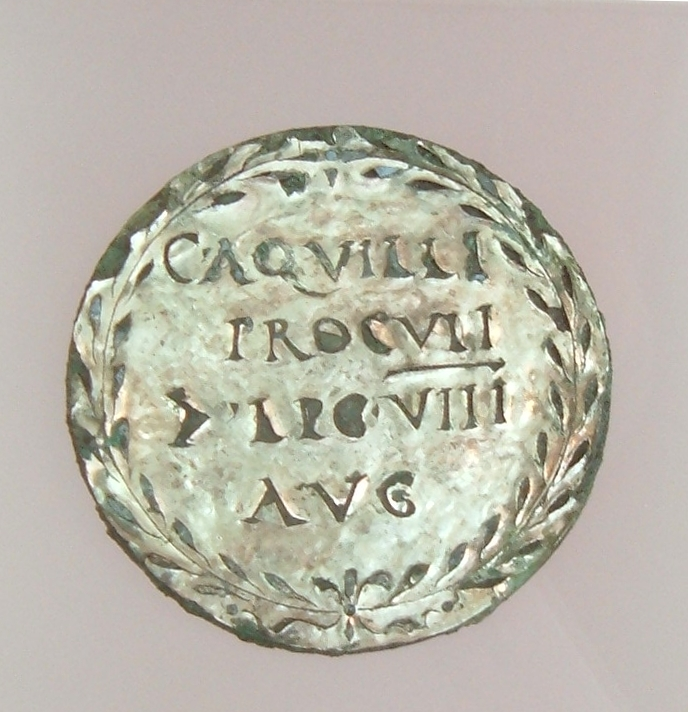
Medallion naming Gaius Aquillus Proculus, a centurion of the Legio VIII Augusta. Valkhof Museum, Nijmegen

== See also ==
- List of Roman gentes

== Bibliography ==
- Marcus Tullius Cicero, Epistulae ad Atticum, Pro Cluentio.
- Titus Livius (Livy), History of Rome.
- Sextus Julius Frontinus, De Aquaeductu (On Aqueducts).
- Gaius Suetonius Tranquillus, De Vita Caesarum (Lives of the Caesars, or The Twelve Caesars).
- Appianus Alexandrinus (Appian), Bellum Civile (The Civil War).
- Lucius Cassius Dio Cocceianus (Cassius Dio), Roman History.
- Aelius Lampridius, Aelius Spartianus, Flavius Vopiscus, Julius Capitolinus, Trebellius Pollio, and Vulcatius Gallicanus, Historia Augusta (Lives of the Emperors).
- Eusebius Sophronius Hieronymus (St. Jerome), De Viris Illustribus (On the Illustrious Men).
- Joseph Hilarius Eckhel, Doctrina Numorum Veterum (The Study of Ancient Coins, 1792–1798).
- Theodor Mommsen et alii, Corpus Inscriptionum Latinarum (The Body of Latin Inscriptions, abbreviated CIL), Berlin-Brandenburgische Akademie der Wissenschaften (1853–present).
- René Cagnat et alii, L'Année épigraphique (The Year in Epigraphy, abbreviated AE), Presses Universitaires de France (1888–present).
- René Cagnat et al., Inscriptiones Graecae ad res Romanas Pertinentes (abbreviated IGRP), Paris (1911-1927)
- C. H. V. Sutherland, Roman Imperial Coinage, volume 1 : Augustus–Vitellius (31 BC–69 AD), London, 1923 (revised 1984).
- James H. Oliver, "M. Aquilius Felix", in The American Journal of Philology, Vol. 67, No. 4 (1946), pp. 311–319.
- T. Robert S. Broughton, The Magistrates of the Roman Republic, American Philological Association (1952–1986).
- Lily Ross Taylor, The Voting Districts of the Roman Republic, University of Michigan Press (1960).
- T. P. Wiseman, New Men in the Roman Senate, 139 BC–AD 14, Oxford University Press (1971).
- Michael Crawford, Roman Republican Coinage, Cambridge University Press (1974, 2001).
- Charles Hersh and Alan Walker, "The Mesagne Hoard", in Museum Notes (American Numismatic Society), Vol. 29 (1984), pp. 103–134.
- Timothy J. Cornell, The Beginnings of Rome: Italy and Rome from the Bronze Age to the Punic Wars (c. 1000–264 BC), Routledge, London (1995).
- Robert Sablayrolles, Libertinus miles. Les cohortes de vigiles, Publications de l'École Française de Rome, (1996).
