= Licinus =

Licinus (Latin for "Upturned") may refer to:

- Julius Licinus, a prominent freedman in the early Roman Empire
- Clodius Licinus or Claudius Licinus, various members of the Claudia clan of ancient Rome
- Porcius Licinus or Portius Licinus, various members of the Porcia clan of ancient Rome
- Sariolenus Licinus, various members of the Sariolena clan of ancient Rome
- Licinus (beetle), a genus of insects in the family Carabidae

== See also ==
- Licinius (disambiguation)
