= Licinius Crassus =

Licinius Crassus may refer to:

- Lucius Licinius Crassus, Roman orator
- Marcus Licinius Crassus (disambiguation), Romans
  - including, Marcus Licinius Crassus
- Publius Licinius Crassus (disambiguation), Romans

== See also ==
- Licinii Crassi
