= Triocala =

Triocala or Triokala (Ancient Greek: Τριόκαλα) was an inland settlement in Sicily, traditionally associated with a fortified hilltop site. Stephanus of Byzantium refers to the place as Tricalon/Trikalon (Τρίκαλον) and Tricala/Trikala (Τρίκαλα).

Tommaso Fazello reports that, in his own era, the remains of the city could still be seen not far from Caltabellotta.

== Name ==
The name is explained by ancient writers as deriving from the Greek "τρία καλά", meaning "three beauties". These are said to refer to:

- its fertile land, suitable for vineyards, olive groves, and agriculture
- its abundant supply of fresh spring water
- its strong natural position on a high, rocky and nearly impregnable height

== Second Punic War ==
Triocala appears in Silius Italicus Punica among the Sicilian cities supporting Carthage during the Second Punic War, within a poetic catalogue of communities involved in the conflict between Rome and Carthage.

== The Servile War and Triocala as a Rebel Center ==
During the Servile War, Triocala became the main stronghold of the Sicilian slave rebellion as the insurgents expanded their influence through raids in the countryside. Under Salvius, who took the name Tryphon after being proclaimed king, it was chosen as his royal base. The site was strengthened with defensive works, including a city wall and a surrounding trench, taking advantage of its naturally strong position on elevated and difficult terrain.

Within Triocala, Tryphon adopted the outward signs of kingship. He wore royal-style clothing, used ceremonial insignia such as attendants bearing rods and axes and acted with the authority of a monarch. He also appointed councillors to advise him and established himself in a palace, with an assembly area where large numbers could gather.

From Triocala, the rebels continued their operations across Sicily, sending out forces to plunder and gather support. The leadership remained based there while campaigns were directed outward from the stronghold.

The strength of Triocala made it difficult for Roman commanders to capture. Lucius Lucullus failed to take the fortress and was forced to withdraw and a later siege by a Roman praetor also ended unsuccessfully, after heavy fighting on both sides.

After Salvius Tryphon and Athenion of Cilicia joined forces, Athenion followed Tryphon's authority and acted in accordance with his commands. However, Tryphon later became suspicious of Athenion's intentions and had him placed under guard.

After Tryphon's death, Athenion succeeded him as leader of the rebels and was not subdued until 101 BC.

== Cicero ==
Cicero, in his prosecution of Gaius Verres, refers to events in the district of Triocala in connection with accusations of conspiracy during his administration in Sicily. He describes how information concerning a suspected conspiracy involving the family of a Sicilian named Leonidas was brought before Verres, after which the named individuals were arrested by his order and taken to Lilybaeum. Cicero includes this case within his account of Verres judicial proceedings, arrests and punishments carried out in Sicily.

== Pliny the Elder ==
Pliny the Elder lists the Triocalini (inhabitants of Triocala) among the tributary inland communities of Sicily.

== Diocese of Triocala ==
The diocese of Triocala, called in Latin Trecalae in the Catholic Church's list of titular sees, is mentioned in the 6th-century Synecdemus as Τρόκαλις (Trocalis).

Its reputed first bishop was Saint Pellegrino, a disciple of Saint Peter. Historical records give the names of four bishops of the see:

- Peter, mentioned in two letters of Pope Gregory I (c. 598)
- Maximus, who attended the Lateran Council of 649 convened by Pope Martin I
- Gregory, who signed the acts of the Third Council of Constantinople (680)
- John, who participated in the Second Council of Nicaea
