= Sicilian revolt =

Sicilian revolt can refer to a number of military conflicts involving Sicily, including:

- First Servile War (135–132 BC) against Roman rule.
- Second Servile War (104-100 BC) against Roman rule.
- Sicilian Vespers (1282) against Angevin rule and the subsequent War of the Sicilian Vespers (1282-1301).
- Sicilian revolution of 1848 against Bourbon rule.

== See also ==
- Sicilian Wars
- Bellum Siculum
