= Servile Wars =

Series of slave revolts in the late Roman Republic

The Servile Wars were a series of three slave revolts ("servile" is derived from servus, Latin for "slave") in the late Roman Republic:

- First Servile War (135−132 BC) — in Sicily, led by Eunus, a former slave claiming to be a prophet, and Cleon from Cilicia
- Second Servile War (104−100 BC) — in Sicily, led by Athenion and Tryphon
- Third Servile War (73−71 BC) — in mainland Italy, led by Spartacus

== See also ==
- Battles of the Servile Wars
- Gaius Octavius' suppressed remnant rebels in Thurii (60 BC)
- Slavery in ancient Rome
- Roman Republican civil wars
- Latrocinium
