= Lucullus (disambiguation) =

Lucullus may refer to:

== People ==
- Licinius Lucullus, any man of the family Licinii Luculli;
- Lucius Licinius Lucullus (fl. 2nd century BC), a Roman consul in 151 BC, grandfather of the famous Lucullus;
- Lucius Licinius Lucullus (c.144 BC – ?), a Roman praetor in 104 BC, father of the famous Lucullus;
- Lucius Licinius Lucullus also known as just Lucullus (118 – 57/56 BC), a Roman consul in 74 BC, the Roman general in Third Mithridatic War;
- Marcus Terentius Varro Lucullus (c. 116 – 56 BC), a consul in 73 BC and proconsul of Macedonia, brother of the famous Lucullus;
- Sallustius Lucullus (died c. 89), a governor of Roman Britain during late 1st century;
- Willis Lucullus Palmer (1854–1912), an American politician and Mayor of Orlando (1891–1893);
- Lucullus Virgil McWhorter (1860–1944), an American farmer and frontiersman.

== Arts and plays ==
- The Trial of Lucullus, a 1930s radio play by Bertolt Brecht;
- The Condemnation of Lucullus (Die Verurteilung des Lukullus), a 1950s opera by Paul Dessau.

== Biology ==
- Svetovidovia lucullus, a cod-like fish in the family Moridae
- Papilio lucullus, synonym of Euphaedra ceres, a butterfly in the family Nymphalidae

== Others ==
- Gardens of Lucullus (Horti Lucullani), the Persian garden laid out by Lucullus
- Lucullus, the dialogue by Cicero that was one of the books of the Academica
