= Lucius Licinius Lucullus (praetor 104 BC) =

Roman general and statesman

Lucius Licinius Lucullus (born c. 144 BC) was a politician and a general of the Roman Republic. He was the eldest son of Lucius Licinius Lucullus, the consul of 151 BC. He, however, did not achieve the political success of his father and failed to hold the consulship, reaching only the position of praetor in 104 BC. During his praetorship he first successfully put down the Vettian Revolt, a minor slave revolt in Campania, before being sent to take command in Sicily during the Second Servile War. He was later relieved of his command and prosecuted for embezzlement upon his recall to Rome. Being convicted, he was banished from the city and lived the remainder of his life in exile. He is the father of the more famous Lucius Licinius Lucullus, who defeated Mithridates and Tigranes in the Third Mithridatic War.

== Family ==
The first recorded Lucullus is a L. Licinius Lucullus who held the junior magistracy of Curule Aedile in 202 BC, and his descendants were to play a relatively obscure part in history until Lucullus' father became the first member of the family to be elected to the consulship in 151 BC, thereby officially ennobling his family. While consul, the elder Lucullus was sent to continue the war against the Celtiberians in Hispania, however, his predecessor made peace and ended the war before his arrival, thereby depriving him of the opportunity for obtaining booty, through which he had hoped to make his family fortune. He therefore proceeded to make war on the neighbouring Vaccaei tribe, without any pretext or authorisation from the Senate, and with the sole aim of plundering their towns and lands for his own enrichment. Upon his return to Rome the elder Lucullus had succeeded in making himself and his family wealthy, and therefore influential, and was never prosecuted for his illegal conduct.

His son, also Lucius Licinius Lucullus, was born around 144 BC and, sometime around 119 BC, married Caecilia Metella, the daughter of Lucius Calvus. She was also the sister of Metellus Numidicus and Metellus Dalmaticus, two of the leading optimates of their day. This political marriage brought the Luculli the support and influence of the powerful Caecilii Metelli family which would help their own rise to prominence. From this marriage Lucullus had two sons, Lucius and Marcus, born around 118/117 BC and 116 BC. However, despite being politically beneficial the match was an unhappy one, with Metella engaging in numerous scandalous affairs which led to an eventual divorce. Plutarch refers to her as having "the bad name of a dissolute woman".

== The Vettian Slave Revolt ==
Lucullus was elected as one of the praetors for 104 BC, probably Praetor Peregrinus, the magistrate responsible for hearing appeals and judicial cases in Italy outside of the city of Rome. During his praetorship a young Roman knight (Eques), Titus Vettius led a slave revolt around the city of Capua in Campania.

Vettius had fallen in love with a beautiful young slave girl and, promising to pay her owner the huge sum of seven Attic talents, had been permitted to take her. However, when the time within which it had been agreed that payment would be made expired, Vettius was unable to fulfil his promise. A further extension of his credit was agreed but, when this again ran out, Vettius panicked. Kidnapping and murdering all his creditors, as well as the girl's owner, he then armed his slaves and declared himself the King of Campania, proclaiming that all slaves who deserted their masters to join him would be free. Soon an army of seven-hundred escaped slaves were terrorising the Campanian countryside, killing all those who refused to join them.

When news reached Rome of the revolt, the Senate appointed Lucullus, then praetor, 'to apprehend the fugitives.' Diodorus records that upon his arrival at Capua, Lucullus had 4,000 infantry and 400 cavalry under his command and that Vettius had a force of about 3,500. Upon learning of Lucullus' approach, Vettius and his men had taken up positions on a nearby hill which they had hastily fortified, and waited. Lucullus' first assault against the rebels was repulsed, given their advantage of the higher ground. So Lucullus tried a different strategy. Making contact with Apollonius, Vettius's general, Lucullus promised him that he would receive no punishment for his part in the rebellion if he were to co-operate with Rome and turn all he could against Vettius. Apollonius accepted the offer and, with the rebels now fighting amongst themselves, Lucullus was able to easily defeat them and put an end to the revolt. Vettius himself, seeing that all was lost, committed suicide before he was captured. All the rebels who were taken prisoner were executed, save Apollonius who, true to his word, Lucullus pardoned and set free.

== The Second Sicilian Slave Revolt ==
=== Outbreak of the Revolt ===
In 104 BC, while Lucullus was suppressing the revolt of Titus Vettius, a second more serious rebellion broke out on Sicily. In that year, consul Gaius Marius had decreed that any Italian citizen being held in slavery was to be released immediately and that henceforth it was to be illegal for an Italian to be a slave. This was in response to the Italian allies refusing to supply levies to fight the invading Germanic Cimbri unless such a decree was issued and the practice of selling Italian citizens into slavery for non-payment of debts outlawed.

As a consequence of this, the Governor of Sicily, Publius Licinius Nerva, set up a tribunal and began the process of interviewing slaves claiming to be Italians and determining whether in fact they were telling the truth or not. By presenting themselves at the tribunal in this way, in a few days, eight hundred Italians had obtained their freedom. However, several wealthy landowners, most of whom depended on a large slave workforce to farm their extensive estates, soon became agitated and demanded that the Governor desist from his work immediately. Giving into pressure, Nerva closed the tribunals. The slaves waiting to present themselves were outraged at being denied their freedom and soon slaves began to rise up against their masters, landowners were murdered in their villas and the escaped slaves began to gather, rapidly growing in numbers until rebel slave armies were roaming the Sicilian countryside looting and pillaging as they went. Nerva, after defeating one band of rebels, found others springing up wherever he turned and, with only a small militia at his disposal, quickly lost control of the situation. An Italian slave named Salvius then emerged, calling himself "King of Sicily" and the rebels began to unite behind him. In Rome, the crisis meant a disruption of the essential Sicilian grain supply, and so swift action was needed.

Having just successfully put down one slave rebellion, the Senate turned to Lucullus again to take over from his hapless relative, Nerva. At the head of a new Roman and allied army numbering around 17,000 men according to Diodorus, Lucullus landed in Sicily in 103 BC.

=== The Battle of Scirthaea ===
Salvius, now calling himself Tryphon, planned to respond to Lucullus' arrival by withdrawing into his fortress of Triocala and there hold out against the Roman siege. However, his general Athenion prevailed upon him not to hide behind the walls of Triocala and instead face the Romans in open battle. Marching to meet Lucullus, the rebels encamped at Scirthaea, twelve miles distant from the Roman camp and, the next day, the two sides prepared for battle. According to Diodorus, Tryphon's host numbered around 40,000 against Lucullus' 14,000.

After much skirmishing, the main battle began as the two armies closed the gap separating them from their enemies and came together. At first it seemed as if the rebels would drive the Romans back, with Athenion and his cavalry inflicting heavy losses upon Lucullus. However, just as it seemed that the slaves might be victorious, Athenion was wounded and cut down from his horse. He was forced to feign death in order to save himself. The rebels, believing their brave general to be dead, lost heart and fled. Tryphon, seeing his army vanishing before him, turned and joined them in flight back to his refuge in Triocala. Later that night, under cover of darkness, the wounded Athenion also escaped. With thousands of slaves cut down in the rout, Diodorus estimates that, as night fell, around 20,000 rebels lay dead, half of Tryphon's army destroyed and Lucullus victorious.

=== The Siege of Triocala ===
From his defeat at Scirthaea, Tryphon, along with the remnants of his army, shut himself behind the gates of Triocala and prepared to resist the inevitable siege. Lucullus, however, was slow to follow up his victory at Scirthaea and it was not until nine days after the battle that he finally arrived outside the walls of the rebel stronghold and placed it under siege. Several times Lucullus attempted to take the city by assault, however all his assaults were repulsed with heavy losses for the Romans. This emboldened the defenders, so Lucullus settled for a long siege to starve the enemy out.

By the end of 103 BC, Lucullus remained outside the walls of Triocala, frustratingly unable to take the city and end the rebellion. In Rome, seeing his failure to take Triocala as evidence of some indolence or incompetence, the Senate did not prorogue his command in Sicily and instead appointed Gaius Servilius to take his place when his term expired in 102 BC.

Enraged at what he saw as a betrayal by the Senate, Lucullus, when he heard that his replacement had crossed the straits and landed in Sicily, ordered his army to burn their camp and destroy all their supplies and siege equipment before withdrawing from Triocala and disbanding completely. By ordering his army to disband, he intended, by ensuring the failure of his successor, he would prove his own innocence from any alleged incompetence. His successor, Servilius, with no army or fortifications, did indeed fail in his attempt to defeat the rebels and was unable to effectively contain the revolt for his entire year. Servilius was ultimately defeated by Athenion, who had succeeded Tyrphon as leader upon the latter's death. Servilius was replaced in 101 BC by Manius Aquillius, the junior consul of that year, who also brought several cohorts from the army of Gaius Marius in Gaul. Aquillius succeeded in defeated the rebel slaves, captured their strongholds and finally putting an end to the revolt in 100 BC.

== Prosecution and Banishment ==
Naturally, upon return to Rome in 102 BC, after disbanding his army and destroying all of his own fortifications, he was immediately brought up on charges and exiled. He was further charged with abuse of his command in Sicily and accused of seeking to prolong the war merely as a pretext to plunder the province for his own profit just as his father had done during his command in Spain. The destruction of his camp and equipment, as well as the disbanding of his army, also supported the charge that he had abused his position and the public resources entrusted to him. To avenge the disgrace done by Lucullus to the Servilii through his treatment of Gaius Servilius, it was a Servilius, known as Servilius the Augur, who prosecuted him for embezzlement.

Lucullus turned to his powerful brother-in-law, Metellus Numidicus, for support against his accusers, Numidicus refused to speak for him. This may have been because the Servilii, too, had family connections with the Metelli—Servilius Vatia being married to the daughter of Metellus Macedonicus, Numidicus's uncle—and so they were unable to favour either side in the trial.

Lucullus was found guilty of peculation and banished from the city in 102 BC. He spent the remainder of his life in exile, possibly in Heraclea in Lucania, and died at an unknown date.

When his two sons, Lucius and Marcus Lucullus reached their majority, they immediately sought revenge by impeaching their father's accuser, Servilius the Augur, whom they charged with misusing public funds. However, despite the best efforts of the brothers, the trial descended into chaos and Servilius was acquitted.
