= Lucius Licinius Lucullus (consul 151 BC) =

2nd-century BCE Roman politician and general, consul in 151 BCE

Lucius Licinius Lucullus was a Roman politician who became consul in 151 BC.

Lucullus was sent to Hispania Citerior (Nearer Spain, on the east coast of Hispania) when the senate rejected a proposal for a peace treaty with the Celtiberians by Marcus Claudius Marcellus to end the Numantine War (154–152 BC). However, Marcellus went ahead with his plan and quickly concluded a treaty before Lucullus got there. Lucullus was disappointed and, "being greedy of fame and needing money because he was in straitened circumstances", he attacked the Vaccaei, a Celtiberian tribe which lived further north and who were not at war with Rome, and did so without the authorisation of the senate. He claimed that they had mistreated the Carpetani as an excuse.

He pitched camp by the town of Cauca (near modern Segovia) and when its people asked for peace terms he demanded, among other things, that a garrison be placed in the town. He got his soldiers to kill all the adult men. Only a few out of 20,000 escaped. Lucullus then went the city of Intercatia (Villanueva del Campo, in the modern province of Zamora) whose inhabitants, having heard about Cauca, refused to ask for terms. He struggled to seize the city, and his lieutenant, Scipio Africanus the Younger, promised the Intercatians that if they made a treaty it would not be broken. They trusted him and surrendered. Lucullus was advised not to attack the large city of Pallantia (modern Palencia), which hosted many refugees and was renowned for its bravery, but because he heard that it was a rich city he camped there. The Pallantian cavalry constantly harassed his foragers until he ran out of food and he had to withdraw. He set up winter camp in the land of the Turdetani (in modern Andalusia).

He was imprisoned by the tribunes for attempting to enforce a troop levy too harshly.

Appian emphasised the greed of Lucullus and said that he fought these campaigns for the sake of gold and silver, which he thought were abundant all over Hispania. However, the people he attacked did not have any and did not even "set any value on those metals". He added that Lucullus was never called into account for his actions.

While he was in Turdetania, the Lusitanians, who were also rebelling, carried out raids in the area. Lucullus invaded Lusitania and, according to Appian, he depopulated it. He was not meant to get involved. The war with the Lusitanians was under the jurisdiction of Servius Sulpicius Galba, the praetor of Hispania Ulterior (Further Spain, roughly modern Andalusia) and Lucullus was wintering in his province. However, Appian wrote that Galba was even more greedy than Lucullus. He let him do so and did the same on the other side of Lusitania. Galba, too, was in search for booty, and slaughtered a large number of Lusitanians by treachery. He, too, was not held to account.

Lucullus built a temple dedicated to Fortuna in the Velabrum to celebrate his "success". He adorned it with statues which Lucius Mummius Achaicus, who defeated the Achaean League in Greece, had lent him. Later Mummius asked for his statues back, but Lucullus told him that it would be irresponsible because they were now dedicated to the goddess. Cassius Dio wrote that Mummius lent him his statues because of his amiable and charitable nature.

== Children ==
Lucullus was the father of the Lucius Licinius Lucullus who was praetor in 104 BC and led Roman forces against rebel Sicilian slaves in the Second Servile War (104–100 BC). He was the grandfather of Lucius Licinius Lucullus, who was consul in 74 BC, and the Roman commander in the first part of the Third Mithridatic War (74-63 BC) until 67 BC, and Marcus Terentius Varro Lucullus, who was consul in 73 BC and proconsul of Macedonia in 72 BC.

== See also ==
- Licinia (gens)

== Notes ==
Political offices
| Preceded by Lucius Valerius Flaccus; Marcus Claudius Marcellus | Consul of the Roman Republic with Aulus Postumius Albinus; 151 BC | Succeeded by Tiberius Quinctius Flaminius; Manius Acilius Balbus |
