= Saria gens =

The gens Saria was an obscure plebeian family at ancient Rome. No members of this gens attained any of the higher offices of the Roman state, but several are known from inscriptions.

== Origin ==
The origin of the nomen Sarius is unclear, but seems to be the source of another gentilicium, Sariolenus, perhaps through a diminutive, Sariolus. The suffix -enus typically indicates nomina formed from other gentilicia.

== Branches and cognomina ==
The only distinct family of the Sarii is known from an inscription at Corfinium in Samnium. Two of them, a father and son, bore the surname Felix, happy or fortunate, while a daughter bore a diminutive, Felicula, and a second son bore the cognomen Justinus. The latter is a derivative of Justus, just, and was apparently inherited from the mother of the family, Pontia Justina. Other surnames found among the Sarii include Celer, swift, Secundus, traditionally given to a second child, and Surus, a Syrian, perhaps indicating the origin of the freedman who bore it.

== Members ==
This list includes abbreviated praenomina. For an explanation of this practice, see filiation.

- Lucius Sarius Celer, buried at Turgalium in Lusitania, aged forty.
- Saria L. f. Felicula, the daughter of Lucius Sarius Felix and Pontia Justina.
- Lucius Sarius Felix, the husband of Pontia Justina, and father of Lucius Sarius Felix, Lucius Sarius Justinus, and Saria Felicula.
- Lucius Sarius L. f. Felix, a decurion buried at Corfinium in Samnium, aged thirty years, six months, and ten days, with a monument from his parents, Lucius Sarius Felix and Pontia Justina, brother, Lucius Sarius Justinus, and sister, Saria Felicula.
- Lucius Sarius L. f. Justinus, the son of Lucius Sarius Felix and Pontia Justina.
- Lucius Sarius L. l. Philinus, buried at Aquileia in Venetia and Histria.
- Titus Sarius Secundus, a potter from Narnia, whose name is stamped on various works.
- Lucius Sarius L. l. Surus, a freedman named in inscriptions from Sacis ad Padum in Venetia and Histria, and the present site of Perpignan, formerly part of Gallia Narbonensis.

== See also ==
- List of Roman gentes

== Bibliography ==
- Theodor Mommsen et alii, Corpus Inscriptionum Latinarum (The Body of Latin Inscriptions, abbreviated CIL), Berlin-Brandenburgische Akademie der Wissenschaften (1853–present).
- Ettore Pais, Corporis Inscriptionum Latinarum Supplementa Italica (Italian Supplement to the Corpus Inscriptionum Latinarum), Rome (1884).
- René Cagnat et alii, L'Année épigraphique (The Year in Epigraphy, abbreviated AE), Presses Universitaires de France (1888–present).
- George Davis Chase, "The Origin of Roman Praenomina", in Harvard Studies in Classical Philology, vol. VIII, pp. 103–184 (1897).
- La Carte Archéologique de la Gaule (Archaeological Map of Gaul, abbreviated CAG), Académie des Inscriptions et Belles-Lettres (1931–present).
- John C. Traupman, The New College Latin & English Dictionary, Bantam Books, New York (1995).
