= Lucius Fufius =

Lucius Fufius was a Roman orator, who was an elder contemporary of Cicero. In 98 BC he accused Manius Aquillius of extortion during the consulship of Aquillius in Sicily in 101 BC. The accused, defended by Marcus Antonius Orator, was acquitted. Lucius Fufius had a quarrelsome personality with passionate oratory, which he retained into extreme old age until his voice was almost gone.
