= Salvius Tryphon =

Late 2nd-century BC leader of Second Servile Revolt

Salvius Tryphon was an aulos player who was proclaimed king by the rebelling slaves of ancient Sicily during the Second Servile War against Rome.

== The Second Servile War ==
In 104 BC the Consul Gaius Marius was recruiting soldiers (legionaries and Italian and foreign auxiliaries) for the war against the Cimbri and Teutones in Gaul. He requested support from King Nicomedes III of Bithynia and was refused, on the grounds that every able-bodied man in Bithynia had been enslaved by Roman tax-farmers for being unable to pay their dues. The Senate issued orders that no slaves were to be taken from among the allies of Rome, and that all such slaves should be immediately freed.

The Roman Propraetor of Sicily Publius Licinius Nerva, in obedience to the edict, at once freed around 800 slaves in his province; aside from awakening discontent among slaves from other nationalities who were not freed, this had the effect of alienating rich plantation owners who saw their slaves being taken from them. Alarmed, Nerva revoked the sentence of manumission, which provoked the slave population into revolt.

== King Tryphon ==
Nerva then failed to react with decision; by false promises he was able to return one body of the rebels to slavery, while neglecting to address a more serious outbreak near Heraclea. A troop of 600 soldiers which he finally dispatched to quell this revolt was beaten and slaughtered; the slaves now gained confidence, having won a large supply of armaments and a strong leader, a former slave called Salvius. Following the example of Eunus, the slave-leader of the First Servile War, who had proclaimed himself an Antiochus of the Seleucid line, Salvius assumed the name Tryphon, from Diodotus Tryphon, a Seleucid ruler.

=== Morgantina ===
After his victory Salvius turned to besiege the city of Morgantina. Nerva tried to relieve the city but was badly beaten by Salvius' slave army. After they took Morgantina the rebel army's ranks grew until they numbered 20,000 infantry and 2,000 cavalry. Athenion, another slave turned rebel, meanwhile rose in the west of Sicily, and marched to join his forces with Salvius's.

=== Rome Strikes Back ===
The Senate sent the praetor perginus Lucullus to crush the rebellion. Salvius planned to respond to Lucullus' arrival by withdrawing into his fortress of Triocala and there hold out against the Romans. However, his general Athenion prevailed upon him not to hide behind the walls of and instead face the Romans in open battle. Marching to meet Lucullus, the rebels encamped at Scirthaea, twelve miles distant from the Roman camp. The next day, the two sides prepared for battle. According to Diodorus, Tryphon's host numbered around 40,000 against Lucullus' 14,000. After much skirmishing, the main battle began as the two armies closed the gap separating them from their enemies and came together. At first it seemed as if the rebels would drive the Romans back, with Athenion and his cavalry inflicting heavy losses upon Lucullus. However, just as it seemed that the slaves might be victorious, Athenion was wounded and cut down from his horse. He was forced to feign death in order to save himself. The rebels, believing their brave general to be dead, lost heart and fled. Salvius Tryphon seeing his army vanishing before him, turned and joined them in flight back to his refuge in Triocala. Later that night, under cover of darkness, the wounded Athenion also escaped. With thousands of slaves cut down in the rout, Diodorus estimates that, as night fell, around 20,000 rebels lay dead, half of Tryphon's army destroyed and Lucullus victorious.

While laying siege to the rebels stronghold Lucullus was recalled and it is alleged, spitefully cut short his campaign, retreating and burning provisions to render the task harder for his successor, Gaius Servilius.

== Death ==
Salvius Tryphon died sometime after the battle of Scirthaea and was succeeded by Athenion. The Slave Revolt was crushed in 101 BC by the consul Manius Aquillius who supposedly killed Athenion with his own hand.

== See also ==
- List of slaves
- Slave revolt
