= Gaius Licinius Macer Calvus =

Orator and poet of ancient Rome

Gaius Licinius Macer Calvus (28 May 82 BC – c. 46 BC) was an orator and poet of ancient Rome.

Son of Licinius Macer and thus a member of the gens Licinia, he was a friend of the poet Catullus, whose style and subject matter he shared.

Calvus's oratorical style opposed the "Asian" school in favor of a simpler Attic model: he characterized Cicero as "solutum et enervem" (loose and nerveless), while Cicero described him as "exsanguem et aridum" (bloodless and dry). However, there was no enmity between these two, and Cicero praised Calvus highly.

Tacitus mentions twenty-one of his speeches, including several speeches against Publius Vatinius. Calvus likely prosecuted Vatinius multiple times, in 58 BC and then later in 54 BC, where he was defended by Cicero. One of these trials (probably the second) is described in Catullus's poem 53. At the trial one of the bystanders caused Catullus to laugh by crying out "Great gods, what an eloquent salaputium!". The meaning of the rare word salaputium has been disputed, but it has been suggested that it may have referred to Calvus's wit or short stature. There may also have been an obscene meaning.

Seneca the Elder mentions his short stature, and refers a story in which Calvus asked to be raised to a platform, so that he could defend one of his clients, Asinius Pollio, being attacked by supporters of Gaius Cato. Seneca also tells a story of how, at a trial, the defendant jumped up and complained "I ask you, judges, am I to be condemned just because that man is a good speaker?"

Catullus counted him as a close friend and addressed several poems to him. In one of these, no. 50, he describes how he and Calvus spent a pleasant afternoon taking turns to write short poems.

Frédéric Plessis published fragments of Calvus in 1896.

== See also ==
- Licinia (gens)
- Poetry of Catullus
