= Titus Vettius =

2nd-century BC Roman knight

Titus Minucius Vettius was a Roman Knight (Eques) who led a minor and unsuccessful slave revolt in Campania in 104 BC. The revolt was quickly crushed by a Roman force led by Lucius Licinius Lucullus. Upon the defeat of his army, Vettius committed suicide to avoid capture.
