= Sariolena gens =

The gens Sariolena was an obscure plebeian family at ancient Rome. They were of senatorial rank, and Lucius Sariolenus Naevius Fastus obtained the consulship in the time of Antoninus Pius.

== Origin ==
The nomen Sariolenus belongs to a class of gentilicia derived from other names using the suffix -enus. The root of the name should be Sariolus, perhaps a diminutive of Sarius.

== Praenomina ==
The only praenomina associated with the Sarioleni are Lucius, Publius, Quintus, and Titus, all of which were among the most common names throughout Roman history.

== Branches and cognomina ==
There is no evidence that the Sarioleni were ever divided into distinct families, and all of their cognomina seem to have been personal, rather than inherited. Many belonged to freedmen, whose surnames had been their personal names prior to their manumission. Among other cognomina, Vocula, a diminutive of vox, a voice, seems to have been bestowed on the senator Sariolenus because of the rumours and gossip that were his stock-in-trade. Celsus was originally given to someone particularly tall. Licinus probably referred to someone with an upturned nose, while Rufus designated someone with red hair, and Proculus, originally a praenomen, was generally believed to have referred to someone born while his father was abroad.

== Members ==
This list includes abbreviated praenomina. For an explanation of this practice, see filiation.

- Sariolenus Vocula, a Roman senator, and a notorious delator under Nero and Vitellius. On the accession of Vespasian, the senate compelled its members to swear that they had not taken part in such deeds, and Sariolenus was threatened with harm until he fled.
- Titus Sariolenus L. f., dedicated a tomb at Scarbantia in Pannonia Superior to his wife, Comagenia Ingenua, aged thirty.
- Lucius Sariolenus Achilleus, buried in an uncertain province, aged twenty-five, with a monument from his friend, Gaius Octavius Mnestus.
- Sariolena L. l. Atalante, a freedwoman buried at Castrimoenium in Latium, in the latter part of the first century AD, with a monument from her friend Daphnus, a freedman, and her son, Auricula.
- Sariolena Auge, built a tomb at Rome for her daughter, Julia Procula, aged twenty-seven years, two months, and fifteen days.
- Sariolena Q. l. Celsa, a freedwoman named in an inscription from Narbo in Gallia Narbonensis, together with Quintus Sariolenus Licinus, and Felix, a freedman.
- Sariolena Dicaeosyne, buried at Rome, aged nineteen years, eighteen days, with a monument dedicated by Marcus Statilius.
- Sariolenus Junianus, mentioned in the Fasti Ostienses under AD 151.
- Quintus Sariolenus Licinus, named in an inscription from Narbo.
- Lucius Sariolenus Naevius Fastus, consul in an uncertain year, probably during the reign of Antoninus Pius.
- Lucius Sariolenus L. f. Proculus, the patron of Volubilis in Mauretania Tingitana.
- Publius Sariolenus Rufus, named in an inscription from Pola in Venetia and Histria.

== See also ==
- List of Roman gentes

== Bibliography ==
- Publius Cornelius Tacitus, Historiae.
- Theodor Mommsen et alii, Corpus Inscriptionum Latinarum (The Body of Latin Inscriptions, abbreviated CIL), Berlin-Brandenburgische Akademie der Wissenschaften (1853–present).
- René Cagnat et alii, L'Année épigraphique (The Year in Epigraphy, abbreviated AE), Presses Universitaires de France (1888–present).
- George Davis Chase, "The Origin of Roman Praenomina", in Harvard Studies in Classical Philology, vol. VIII, pp. 103–184 (1897).
- Paul von Rohden, Elimar Klebs, & Hermann Dessau, Prosopographia Imperii Romani (The Prosopography of the Roman Empire, abbreviated PIR), Berlin (1898).
- John C. Traupman, The New College Latin & English Dictionary, Bantam Books, New York (1995).
