= Publius Licinius Crassus =

Publius Licinius Crassus may refer to:

- Publius Licinius Crassus (consul 171 BC)
- Publius Licinius Crassus (consul 97 BC)
- Publius Licinius Crassus (son of triumvir)
- Publius Licinius Crassus Dives Mucianus
- Publius Licinius Crassus Dives (consul 205 BC)
- Publius Licinius Crassus Dives (praetor 57 BC)
- Publius Licinius Crassus Junianus (fl. 1st century BC), Roman tribune 53 BC

== See also ==
- Crassus (cognomen)
