= Licinius Macer =

Roman historian and senator (died 66 BC)

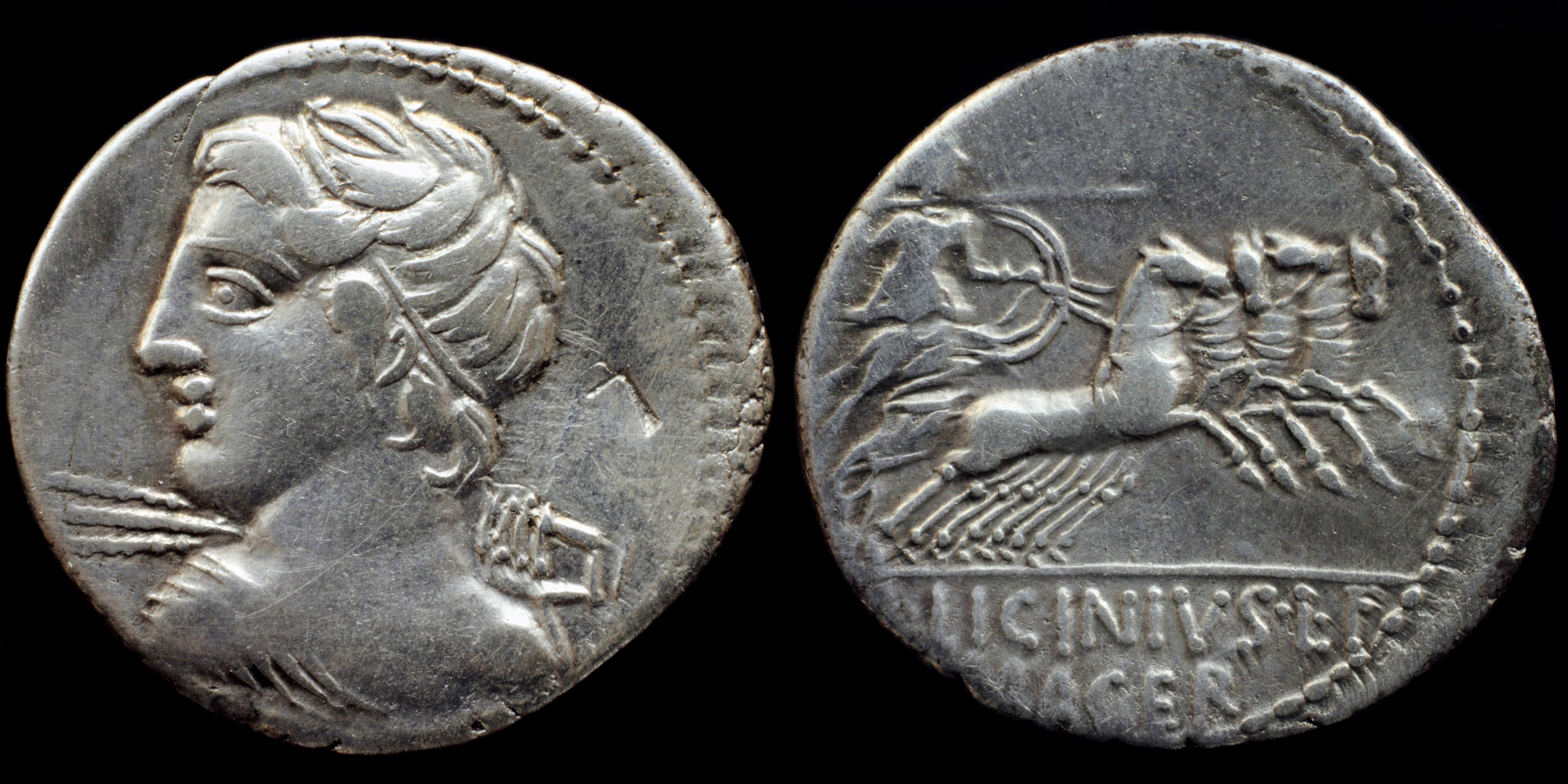

First side of the image: O: Diademed bust of Vejovis hurling thunderbolt
Second side of the image: R: Minerva with javelin and shield riding quadriga C·LICINIUS·L·F / MACER
Silver denarius struck by Licinius Macer in Rome 84 BC. Licinius Macer as moneyer was responsible for production of the Roman coinage ref.: Licinia 16; sear5 #274; Cr354/1; Syd 732

Gaius Licinius Macer (died 66 BC) was a Roman annalist and politician.

== Life ==
A member of the ancient plebeian clan Licinia, he was tribune in 73 BC. Sallust mentions him agitating for the people's rights. He became praetor in 68 BC, but in 66 BC Cicero succeeded in convicting him of bribery and extortion, upon which Macer committed suicide.

== Work ==
Macer wrote a history of Rome, in 16 books. The work is now lost, but from Livy and Dionysius who both used it, we know that it began with the founding of the city, and that Pyrrhus appeared in Book II. Livy casts doubt on Macer's reliability, suggesting that he misrepresented events in order to glorify the Licinii, but notes that he quotes original sources such as the Linen Rolls. According to Macrobius, he credited Romulus with the introduction of intercalation to the Roman calendar.

== See also ==
- Licinius Macer Calvus, his son and a noted poet.
