= Petrus Crassus =

Italian jurist

Petrus Crassus was a jurist of the eleventh century, teaching at Ravenna. He is known for his treatise The Defence of King Henry (Latin: Defensio Henrici IV) from 1084 supporting the Emperor Henry IV against Pope Gregory VII during the investiture contest.

According to the Catholic Encyclopedia, he was the only layman involved in the struggle, and supported the autonomy of the state. Walter Ullmann says that the Defensio is "the first book that employed Roman law in a professional manner and in the service of public government." Joseph Canning writes

Peter Crassus' text also formed part of the general theme of Romanism developed among Italian supporters of the Salian monarchy, as witnessed by Benzo of Alba's Liber ad Heinrichum IV. (c.1085), with its emphasis on the central role of the emperor as ruler of the world (with Rome its head), 'vicar of the Creator' (vicarius conditoris) and maker of popes.
