= Julius Licinus =

Roman administrator in Gaul

Julius Licinus was a Gallic freedman, who worked as a procurator for the Roman emperor Augustus in Gaul. He became rather infamous for the amount of wealth he extracted from Gaul and for his methods in doing so.

Licinus was captured and enslaved by Julius Caesar during the Gallic Wars. Later Caesar freed him and under Augustus he was assigned the position of a procurator for all of Gaul or parts of it. The exact dates for his appointment are not known, but by the time Augustus visited Gaul in 16/15 BC Licinus had been in office for a number of years and already garnered a somewhat dubious reputation. Cassius Dio described him as having done more damage to Gaul than the Germanic tribes. Complaints about Licinus' unethical behaviour to Augustus led to him being recalled to Rome in 15 BC. According to Cassius Dio Augustus was so embarrassed by Licinus' actions, that he decided to dismiss the complaints as untrue. Licinus himself argued before Augustus, that his large wealth extortion had deprived the Gauls of the resources for a potential uprising and that he merely saved and managed all that wealth for Rome. Aside from his removal as procurator Licinus got away unscathed and retired in Rome.

Licinus cleverly used his appointment and his knowledge of Roman culture to extract large amounts of wealth from the Gauls. For instance in an anecdote described by Cassius Dio Licinus convinced the Gauls that the Roman year had 14 rather than 12 months and hence required 14 "monthly" tributes per year.

Within Roman society Licinus became a symbol for the archetypal millionaire. Seneca and Persius compared him to Crassus, one of the richest Romans during the late republic. Juvenal linked him to Pallas, the extremely rich freedman of emperor Claudius. Martial described Licinus's tomb in Rome as lofty marble structure and an anonymous contemporary poem mentioned his marble tomb as well. However Licinus didn't just become synonymous for great riches but also an example of a Roman administrator fleecing provincials and later retiring with his ill-gotten wealth.

== Historical sources ==
- Cassius Dio: Roman History, Volume 54
