= Villanueva del Campo =

Coordinates: 41°59′08″N 5°24′27″W

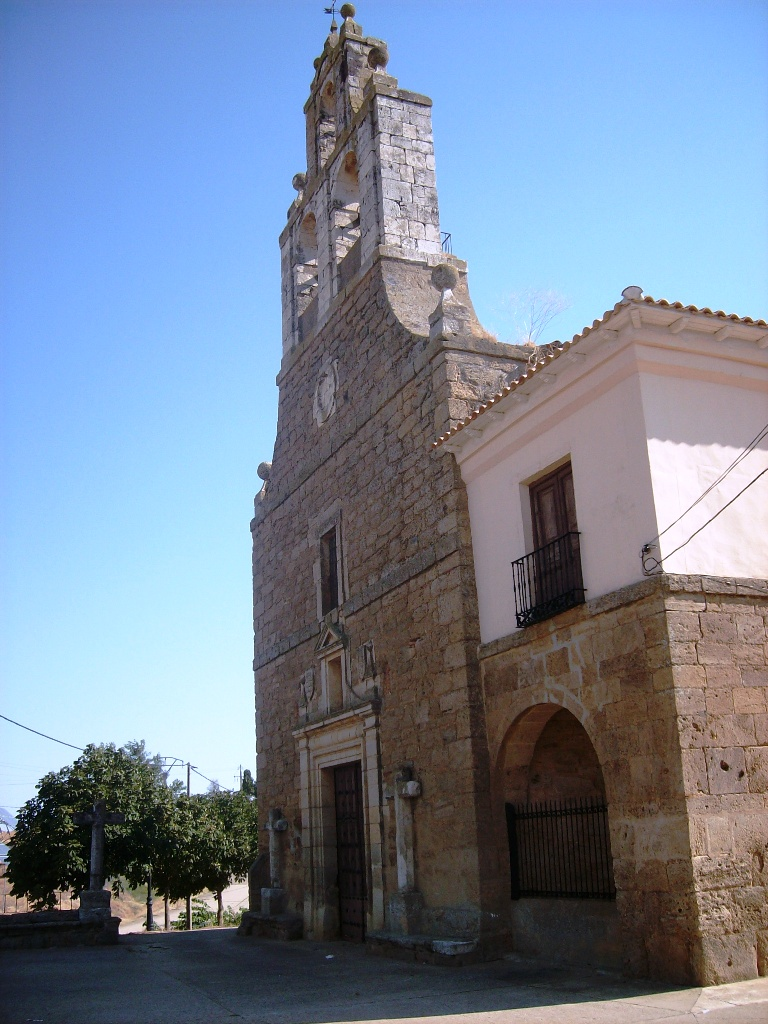

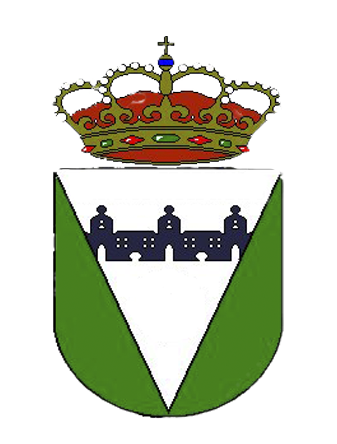
- Flag Coat of arms
- Interactive map of Villanueva del Campo
- Country: Spain
- Autonomous community: Castile and León
- Province: Zamora
- Municipality: Villanueva del Campo

Area
  - Total: 40.09 km^{2} (15.48 sq mi)

Population (2025-01-01)
  - Total: 736
  - Density: 18.4/km^{2} (47.5/sq mi)
- Time zone: UTC+1 (CET)
  - Summer (DST): UTC+2 (CEST)

Villanueva del Campo (Spanish pronunciation: [biʎaˈnweβa ðel ˈkampo]) is a town located in the Province of Zamora, Castile and León, Spain. In ancient Rome, it was called Intercatia.
