= Publius Licinius Crassus Dives (praetor 57 BC) =

Publius Licinius Crassus Dives (fl. 59–57 BC) was a Roman senator during the time of the First Triumvirate in the late Republic. He was the judge who examined in 59 BC the controversial affair of Lucius Vettius, who was supposedly involved in a conspiracy to assassinate the "triumvir" Pompey. Broughton supposed, on basis of this, that Dives had been a plebeian aedile in the previous year. Dives was a praetor in 57 BC, and, along with his other colleagues in office, supported the recall of the ex-consul Cicero from exile. He appears to have squandered a substantial amount of his wealth, causing Cicero to comment, in 59 BC, that his surname Dives (Latin for 'rich') was no longer appropriate for him. Valerius Maximus reported that Crassus went bankrupt and that the name "Dives" became a provocative taunt; this must have happened after his term as praetor.

Crassus Dives must have been a grandson or (more likely) great-grandson of Publius Licinius Crassus Dives Mucianus, consul in 131 BC, whose "wisdom and eloquence" D. R. Shackleton Bailey contrasted with his descendant's "degenerate" behavior". The later Crassus Dives was thus only a distant relation of the contemporary Marcus Licinius Crassus, one of the three so-called triumvirs. Publius Crassus Dives has also been tentatively identified as the adoptive father of Publius Licinius Crassus Junianus, an opponent of Julius Caesar during the civil war. The adoption had taken place by 54 BC.

== See also ==
- Licinia gens
