= Marcus Licinius Crassus (disambiguation) =

Marcus Licinius Crassus was a member of the First Triumvirate with Julius Caesar and Pompey the Great.

Marcus Licinius Crassus may also refer to:

- Marcus Licinius Crassus (quaestor 54 BC), son of the above
- Marcus Licinius Crassus (consul 30 BC), son of the above, who led a successful campaign in Macedonia and Thrace from 29 to 27 BC
- Marcus Licinius Crassus Frugi (consul 14 BC), born into the Calpurnius Piso Frugi family, adopted by the above
- Marcus Licinius Crassus Frugi (consul 27), son of the above
