= Athenion of Cilicia =

Rebel slave king of ancient Rome

Athenion (Ancient Greek: Ἀθηνίων) was a man of ancient Cilicia who was a major figure in the Second Servile War in Sicily, and had a career similar to that of the Cilician Cleon.

Athenion had been a herdsman or leader of bandits (or both) in Cilicia, and was captured there and sold into slavery, and shipped off to Sicily.

After the war broke out on the eastern side of the island, led by the Syrian slave and ostensible prophet Salvius Tryphon, Athenion killed his own masters and led a slave rebellion of the 200 slaves on the farm he worked. Five days later, they had liberated 800 more slaves from nearby slavemasters, and his army ultimately grew to 10,000. Ancient sources call out that Athenion was an advanced strategic thinker, and did not unilaterally accept all western slaves into his army, and compelled many to keep at their former tasks, mostly farming, in order to insure the continuity of the army's supply chain.

By the aid of his strategy of resource management and his own supposed astrological powers, Athenion cemented his leadership position and became the "king" of these freed slaves in the western part of Sicily. After a fruitless attack upon Lilybaeum, he joined Tryphon, who, under the influence of a suspicious jealousy, threw Athenion into prison initially, but afterwards released him.

Athenion and his armies tore through the forces of two Roman praetors, Gaius Servilius and Lucius Licinius Lucullus, and in the latter battle, the Battle of Scirthaea, Athenion was severely wounded. On the death of Salvius, he took the title of king of all the rebel forces. He maintained his ground for some time successfully, but in 101 BCE the Romans sent against him the Roman consul Manius Aquillius. Athenion challenged Aquillius to single combat, and the fact that Aquillius accepted demonstrated how seriously Rome took him as an enemy leader. However, Athenion lost the battle, and was slain by Aquillius. Athenion's army lost heart and was routed shortly thereafter.
