= Publius Licinius Nerva =

Roman governor of Sicily during the Second Servile War

Publius Licinius Nerva was a Roman politician during the Late Roman Republic. As a propraetor he was assigned as Governor of Sicily in 104 BC at the outbreak of the Second Servile War.

In the midst of the Cimbrian War, Italian allies of Rome, upon the mustering of troops, protested publicani tax farmers selling their citizens into slavery as punishment for tax arrears. As these abuses interfered with Roman ability to speedily raise troops, the Senate decreed that any citizen of an ally would be immediately emancipated. The Senate assigned Nerva to establish a tribunal in Sicily to determine who qualified for release.

A coalition of slaveholders in Sicily confronted the praetor and, with bribes and threats, shut the tribunal down. Due to the mounting pressure from the slaveholders and the slaves themselves, Nerva feared violent outbreaks from the side who came off worse in the confrontation and refused to listen to any more of the slaves' complaints. Claiming that they would not face repercussions for their actions, Nerva told the slaves to disperse and return to their masters. However, the slaves instead decided amongst themselves to start a revolt. Nerva tried to put down the revolt, but failed to react with decision; by false promises he was able to return one body of the rebels to slavery, but neglected to address more serious outbreaks near Heraclea and near Lilybaeum. Eventually, Nerva dispatched a detachment of 600 soldiers to Heraclea but they were defeated, the slaves now gained confidence, having won a large supply of armaments. Nerva was replaced at the end of his term by Lucius Licinius Lucullus.
