= Second Servile War =

Unsuccessful slave uprising against the Roman Republic on the island of Sicily

- Part of the Servile Wars
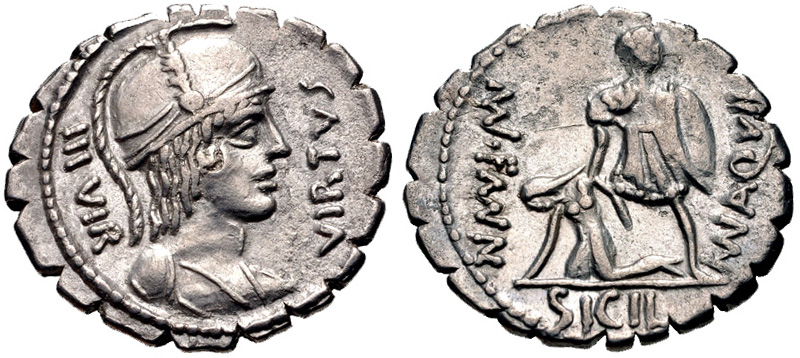
- Denarius minted by Aquillius' grandson in 65 BC. The obverse features Virtus, an allusion to the valour shown by Aquillius during the Second Servile War, a theme also depicting on the reverse, with Aquillius raising an allegory of Sicily.
Date	104–100 BC
Location	Sicily
Result	Roman victory
Territorial changes	None

Belligerents
Roman Republic	Slaves of Sicily

Commanders and leaders
Publius Licinius Nerva; Lucius Licinius Lucullus; Gaius Servilius; Manius Aquilius	Salvius; Athenion †

The Second Servile War was an unsuccessful slave uprising against the Roman Republic on the island of Sicily. The war lasted from 104 BC until 100 BC. It was one of three Servile Wars, spaced approximately 30 years apart.

== Background ==
The consul Gaius Marius was recruiting soldiers for the war against the Cimbri and Teutones in the North. He requested support from King Nicomedes III of Bithynia near the Roman province of Asia; but Nicomedes refused, on the grounds that every able-bodied man in Bithynia had been enslaved by Roman tax-gatherers for being unable to pay their dues. The Senate replied by issuing orders that no slaves were to be taken from among allies of Rome, and that all such slaves should be immediately freed.

The propraetor Publius Licinius Nerva, in obedience to the edict, at once freed (that is, manumitted) around 800 slaves in his province of Sicily. Aside from awakening discontent among slaves from other nationalities who were not freed, this had the effect of alienating the Sicilian plantation owners who saw their human chattels unceremoniously being taken out of their hands. Alarmed, Nerva revoked the manumission, which provoked the slave population into revolt.

== Salvius Tryphon ==
Nerva failed to react decisively; by false promises he was able to return one body of the rebels to slavery, while neglecting to address a more serious outbreak near Heraclea. Eventually, Nerva dispatched a detachment of 600 soldiers to take care of the rebels near Heraclea but they were beaten and slaughtered; the slaves now gained confidence, having won a large supply of armaments and a strong leader, a former slave called Salvius. Taking the previous slave-leader Eunus for his example, who had proclaimed himself an Antiochus of the Seleucid line, he assumed the name Tryphon, from Diodotus Tryphon, a Seleucid ruler.

After his victory, Salvius besieged the city of Morgantina. Nerva now marched against him with Sicily's militia but he was also defeated. The slaves then managed to take the city. After Morgantina, Salvius' slave army swelled to 2,000 horsemen and 20,000 foot. Meanwhile, another revolt had broken out in western Sicily; there Athenion, a Cilician slave with a career analogous to Cleon's, rose in revolt. He marched his slave army to join with Salvius upon hearing about the victory at Morgantina.

== Lucullus ==
In 103 BC the Senate sent the praetor Lucius Licinius Lucullus, who had just put down a revolt in Campania (Vettian Revolt), to quell the rebellion. Lucullus, at the head of a 17,000 strong Roman and allied army, landed in western Sicily and marched on the rebel stronghold of Triocala.

=== Battle of Scirthaea ===
When Salvius Tryphon, the Slave King, heard of Lucullus‘ arrival he wanted to hold out against the Romans inside Triocala. His general Athenion, however, persuaded him not to hide but instead face the Romans in open battle. Marching to meet Lucullus, the rebels encamped at Scirthaea, twelve miles distant from the Roman camp and, the next day, the two sides lined up for battle. According to Diodorus, Tryphon's host numbered around 40,000.

After much skirmishing, the main battle began as the two armies closed the gap and came together. At first it seemed as if the rebels would drive the Romans back, with Athenion and his cavalry inflicting heavy losses upon Lucullus‘ flanks. However, just as it seemed that the slaves might be victorious, Athenion was wounded and fell from his horse. He was forced to feign death in order to save himself. The rebels, believing their general to be dead, lost heart and fled. Salvius Tryphon, seeing his army routed, turned and joined them in flight back to Triocala. Later that night, under cover of darkness, the wounded Athenion escaped the battlefield. With thousands of slaves cut down in the rout, Diodorus estimates that, as night fell, around 20,000 rebels lay dead, half of Tryphon's army.

=== Siege of Triocala ===
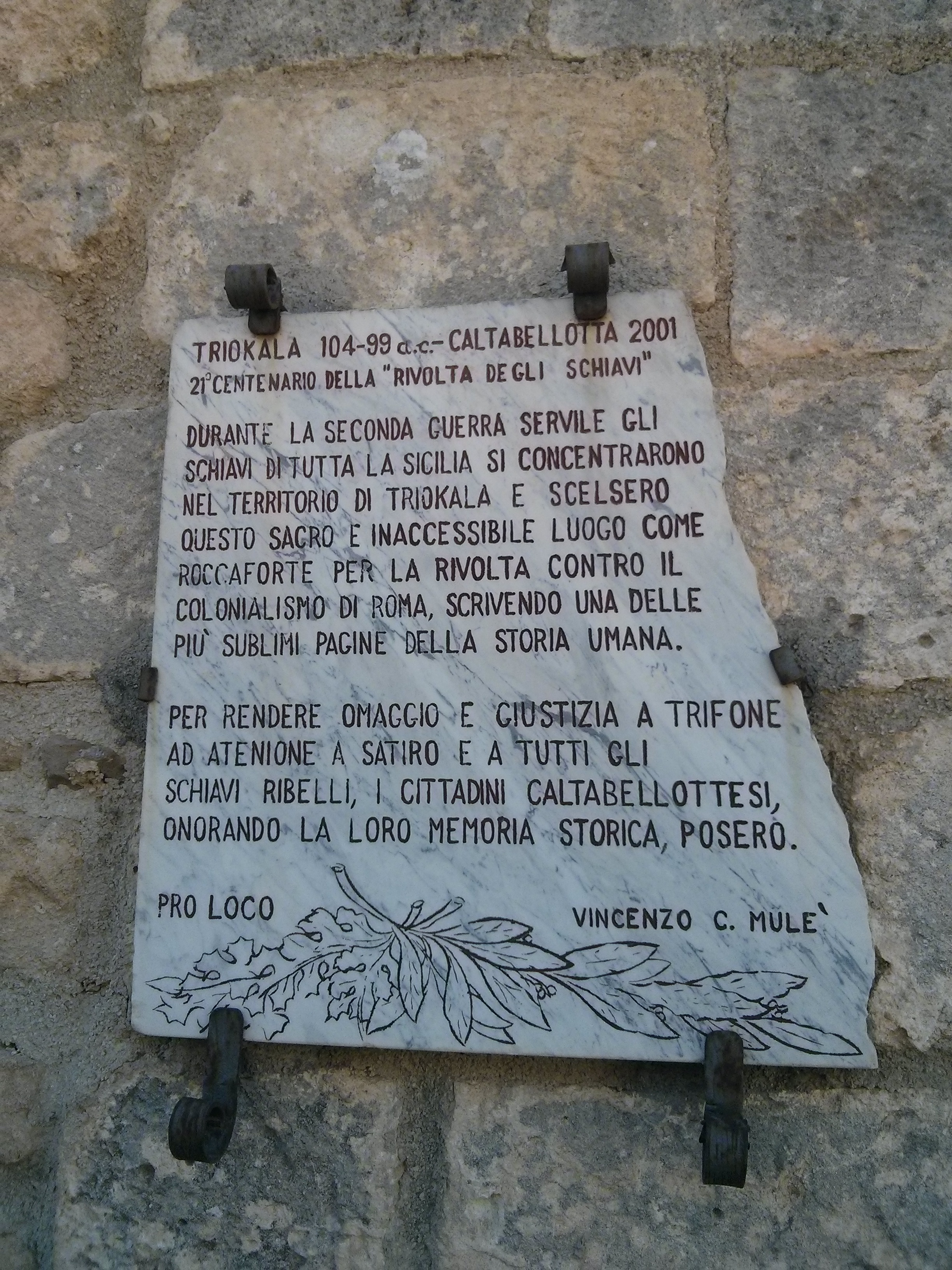
Plaque in Caltabellotta marking the 2,100th anniversary of the revolt. (2001)

After the battle, Lucullus slowly but surely worked his way to Triocala, restoring Roman Rule while he marched. At Triocala the rebels had dug in; Lucullus started a siege while waiting for his command to be extended, but when he heard that he had been replaced he spitefully ended the siege, burned his siegeworks, camp and provisions, retreated and disbanded his army. Lucullus did this to render the task harder for his successor, Gaius Servilius the Augur; Lucullus intended, by ensuring the failure of his successor, to prove his own innocence from any alleged incompetence.

=== Other ===
According to Deipnosophistae (early 3rd-century AD), referring to Posidonius, making mention of large slave revolt happened in Mines of Laurion around the times of the second servile war in Sicily.

== Athenion ==
In 102 BC Athenion, who had succeeded as slave-king after Salvius' death (he had passed after the earlier battle) was able to take Gaius Servilius's camp by surprise; Servilius' army was routed and dispersed, undoing all of Lucullus' previous success.

== Revolt suppressed ==
Finally, in 101 BC, the Roman consul Manius Aquillius was given the command against the insurgents in Sicily. The Senior Consul, Gaius Marius, donated several cohorts from his army in Gaul to Aquillius. With these and the troops he recruited, equipped and trained en route he succeeded in defeating Athenion's slave army upon arrival. He supposedly killed Athenion by his own hand. The revolt was quelled, and 1,000 slaves who surrendered were sent to fight against beasts in the arena back at Rome for the amusement of the populace. To spite the Romans, they refused to fight and killed each other quietly with their swords, until the last flung himself on his own blade. It was the second of a series of three slave revolts in the Roman Republic fueled by the same abuses in Sicily and Southern Italy.

== Second Servile War in literature ==
- F. L. Lucas's short story "The Boar" (Athenaeum, 10 September 1920 ) is set in Sicily in the aftermath of the Slave War.
- In Steven Saylor’s novel Arms of Nemesis (the second book in his Roma Sub Rosa series) the Second Slave War (Servile War) is mentioned in detail during a dinner party with Marcus Licinius Crassus who is about to campaign against the rebel slaves of Spartacus in the Third Slave War.
- In Colleen McCullough‘s novel The First Man in Rome (the first book in her Masters of Rome series) the Second Servile War is mentioned several times. It figures as the background for the story line about Lucius Appuleius Saturninus.
