= Manius Aquillius (consul 101 BC) =

2nd and 1st-century BC Roman consul

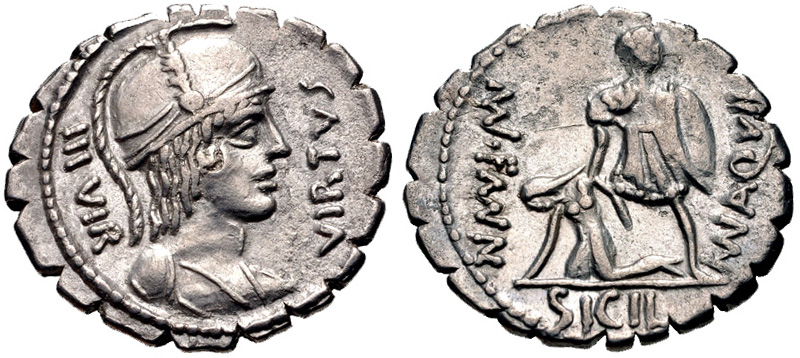
Denarius minted by Aquillius' grandson in 65 BC. The obverse features Virtus, an allusion to the valour shown by Aquillius during the Second Servile War, a theme also depicting on the reverse, with Aquillius raising an allegory of Sicily.

Manius Aquillius (died 88 BC) was a Roman politician and general during the late Roman Republic. He was a member of the ancient Roman gens Aquillia, probably a son of Manius Aquillius, consul in 129 BC. Aquillius served as Consul of Rome with Gaius Marius in 101 BC. Before his consulship, during the Cimbrian War, he had served as a legate under Marius in Gaul. He played a pivotal role during the Battle of Aquae Sextiae where he surprised the Teutones by attacking them from behind. As consul he crushed a slave revolt in Sicily by defeating Athenion of Cilicia in single combat, a victory that was commemorated by Aquillius's family by coinage issued decades later. At the start of the First Mithridatic War he was defeated and captured by Mithridates VI of Pontus who had him executed by pouring molten gold down his throat.

== Career ==
=== Triumvir monetalis ===
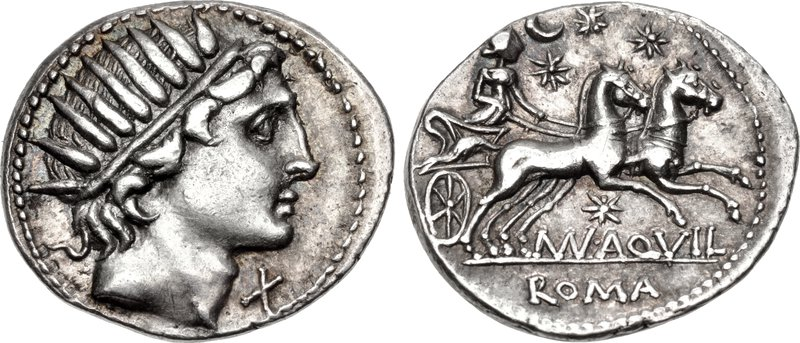
Denarius minted by Aquillius in 109 or 108 BC. The obverse shows the head of Sol, while the reverse depicts Luna riding the heavens.

Aquillius was triumvir monetalis in 109 or 108, minting denarii showing the interest of his family in the cult of Sol and Luna.

=== Supporter of Marius ===
Aquillius was a loyal follower of Gaius Marius. He served Marius as a legate (104-102 BC) during Marius's campaign against the Cimbri and Teutones in Gaul. In 103 BC, while Marius was in Rome for his election campaign (running for his fourth consulship), Aquillius was left in command of the army in case the migrating Cimbri and Teutones invaded before Marius could return to command the army himself.

=== Aquae Sextiae ===
Manius Aquillius fought with the Roman army of Gaius Marius defeating the Teutones and Ambrones at the Battle of Aquae Sextiae. As one of Marius's legates, Aquillius shared in the glory and prestige earned through their victory. He would capitalize on his military success when he ran for consul.

=== Consulship and Sicily ===
As a reward for his loyal services, Gaius Marius ran with Aquillius under a joint ticket for the consulship of 101 BC. In gratitude for their victory against the Teutones they were both elected with Aquillius as Junior Consul and Marius as Senior Consul. During his consulship, with Rome struggling with a famine caused by the slave revolt in Sicily, Aquillius was sent to Sicily to put down the revolt. Aquillius completely subdued the insurgents and was rewarded an ovation in Rome in 100 BC. In 98 BC, Aquillius was accused by Lucius Fufius of maladministration in Sicily. In the subsequent trial, he was defended by Marcus Antonius the orator, the consul of 99. Gaius Marius also showed his support. Even if there was sufficient evidence of his guilt, he was acquitted because of his bravery in the war.

=== Mithridates and death ===
In 90 BC, Aquillius was sent as ambassador to Asia Minor to restore Nicomedes IV of Bithynia, who had recently been expelled from his kingdom by Mithridates VI of Pontus. However, after achieving this, Aquillius then encouraged Nicomedes to raid Pontic territory. This prompted a furious backlash from Mithridates in 89 BC, whose counter-attack began the First Mithridatic War.

Aquillius marched with one legion of auxiliaries (4,000-6,000 men), the only troops available in the Asia province, against Mithridates from the west while Quintus Oppius, the governor of Cilicia, invaded with two legions from the south. Aquillius soon found out he was seriously outnumbered; at Lake Tatta he saw 100,000 Pontic infantry waiting for him. Mithridates' forces eventually tracked and defeated Aquillius near Protostachium. Aquillius fled and attempted to make his way back to Italy. He managed to make it to Lesbos, where he was delivered to Mithridates by the inhabitants of Mytilene. After being taken to the mainland, he was then placed on a donkey and paraded back to Pergamon. During the trip, he was forced to confess his supposed crimes against the peoples of Anatolia. Aquillius's father, the elder Manius Aquillius, was a former Roman governor of Pergamon and was hated for the egregious taxes that he imposed. It was generally thought that Manius Aquillius the younger would follow in the footsteps of his father as a tax profiteer and was hated by some of the local peoples.

Aquillius was eventually executed by Mithridates by having molten gold poured down his throat. The method of execution became famous and, according to some unreliable accounts, was repeated by Parthian contemporaries to kill Marcus Licinius Crassus who was at the time the richest man in Rome and a member of the First Triumvirate.

== Notes ==
Political offices
Preceded by Gaius Marius; Quintus Lutatius Catulus	Roman consul 101 BC; With: Gaius Marius	Succeeded by Gaius Marius; Lucius Valerius Flaccus
