= Lucius (praenomen) =

Ancient Roman praenomen

Lucius (/ˈluːʃ(i)əs/ LOO-sh(ee-)əs, Latin: [ˈluːkiʊs]) is a Latin praenomen, or personal name, which was one of the most common names throughout Roman history. The feminine form is Lucia (/ˈluːʃiə, luːˈtʃiːə/ LOO-shee-ə, loo-CHEE-ə, Latin: [ˈluːkia]). The praenomen was used by both patrician and plebeian families, and gave rise to the patronymic gentes Lucia and Lucilia. It was regularly abbreviated L.

Throughout Roman history, Lucius was the most common praenomen, used slightly more than Gaius and somewhat more than Marcus. Although a number of prominent families rarely or never used it, it was amongst the most frequently given names in countless others. The name survived the collapse of the Western Empire in the fifth century, and has continued into modern times.

== Origin and meaning ==
In the treatise De Praenominibus (Concerning Praenomina), of uncertain authorship, Lucius is said to have been derived from lux, light, and is supposed originally to have been given to children who were born at dawn. This was the general belief among Roman scholars.

Chase connects the name with the archaic adjective loucus, which meant "bright" or "shining", although by the classical period it had come to refer to a cleared grove. He points out the Greek cognate, leukos, from which the personal name Lucas or Luke is derived. The cognomen Lucullus is supposed to be a diminutive formed from the same root, referring to a grove. The Etruscan form of this praenomen is Lucie.

== Bibliography ==
- Marcus Terentius Varro, De Lingua Latina (On the Latin Language).
- Liber de Praenominibus, a short treatise of uncertain authorship, traditionally appended to Valerius Maximus' Factorum ac Dictorum Memorabilium (Memorable Facts and Sayings).
- Gaius Suetonius Tranquillus, De Vita Caesarum (Lives of the Caesars, or The Twelve Caesars).
- Paulus Diaconus, Epitome de Sex. Pompeio Festo de Significatu Verborum (Epitome of Festus' De Significatu Verborum).
- Dictionary of Greek and Roman Biography and Mythology, William Smith, ed., Little, Brown and Company, Boston (1849).
- Christian Matthias Theodor Mommsen, Römische Forschungen (Roman Research), Weidmannsche Buchhandlung, Berlin (1864–1879).
- George Davis Chase, "The Origin of Roman Praenomina", in Harvard Studies in Classical Philology, vol. VIII, pp. 103–184 (1897).
- Harper's Dictionary of Classical Literature and Antiquities, Harry Thurston Peck, ed. (Second Edition, 1897).
- Jacques Heurgon, La Vie quotidienne chez lez Etrusques (Daily Life of the Etruscans), Hachette, Paris (1961, 1989).
