= Caltabellotta =

- Comune
- Comune di Caltabellotta
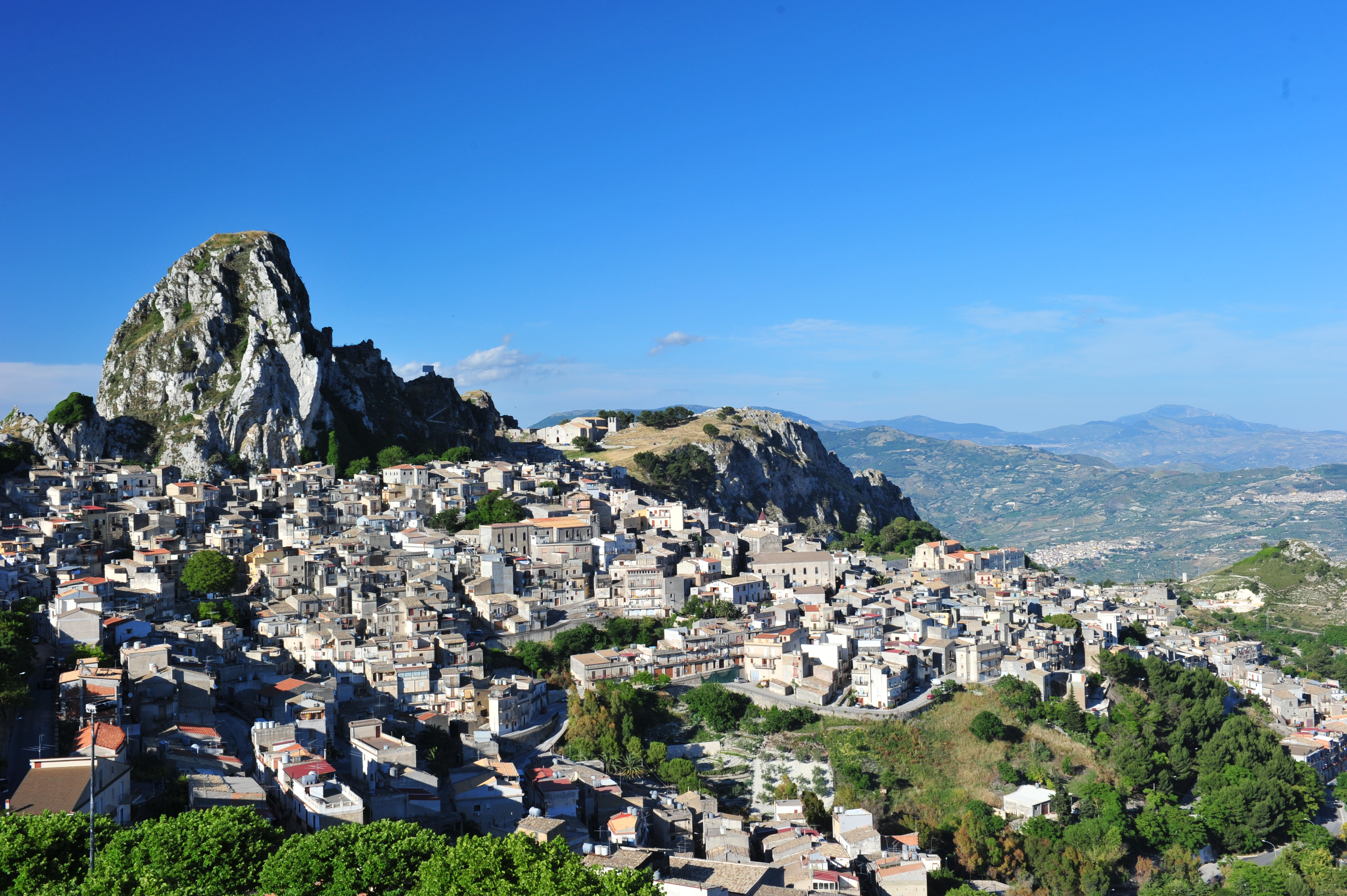
- View of Caltabellotta

- Coat of arms

- Location within Italy Location within Sicily
- Coordinates: 37°35′N 13°13′E
- Country: Italy
- Region: Sicily
- Province: Agrigento (AG)
- Frazioni: Sant'Anna

Government
  - Mayor: Paolo Luciano Segreto

Area
  - Total: 124.09 km^{2} (47.91 sq mi)
- Elevation: 949 m (3,114 ft)

Population (2026)
  - Total: 3,065
  - Density: 24.70/km^{2} (63.97/sq mi)
- Demonym: Caltabellottesi
- Time zone: UTC+1 (CET)
  - Summer (DST): UTC+2 (CEST)
- Postal code: 92010
- Dialing code: 0925
- Patron saint: Saint Pellegrino
- Saint day: 18 August
- Website: Official website

Caltabellotta (Sicilian: Cataviḍḍotta) is a municipality (comune) in the province of Agrigento, in the autonomous island region of Sicily in Italy, located about 60 kilometres (37 mi) south of Palermo and about 45 kilometres (28 mi) northwest of Agrigento. It has 3,065 inhabitants.

In addition to the main portion of Caltabellotta, the municipality also contains the frazione of Sant'Anna, and borders the municipalities of Bisacquino, Burgio, Calamonaci, Chiusa Sclafani, Giuliana, Ribera, Sambuca di Sicilia, Sciacca, and Villafranca Sicula.

== History ==
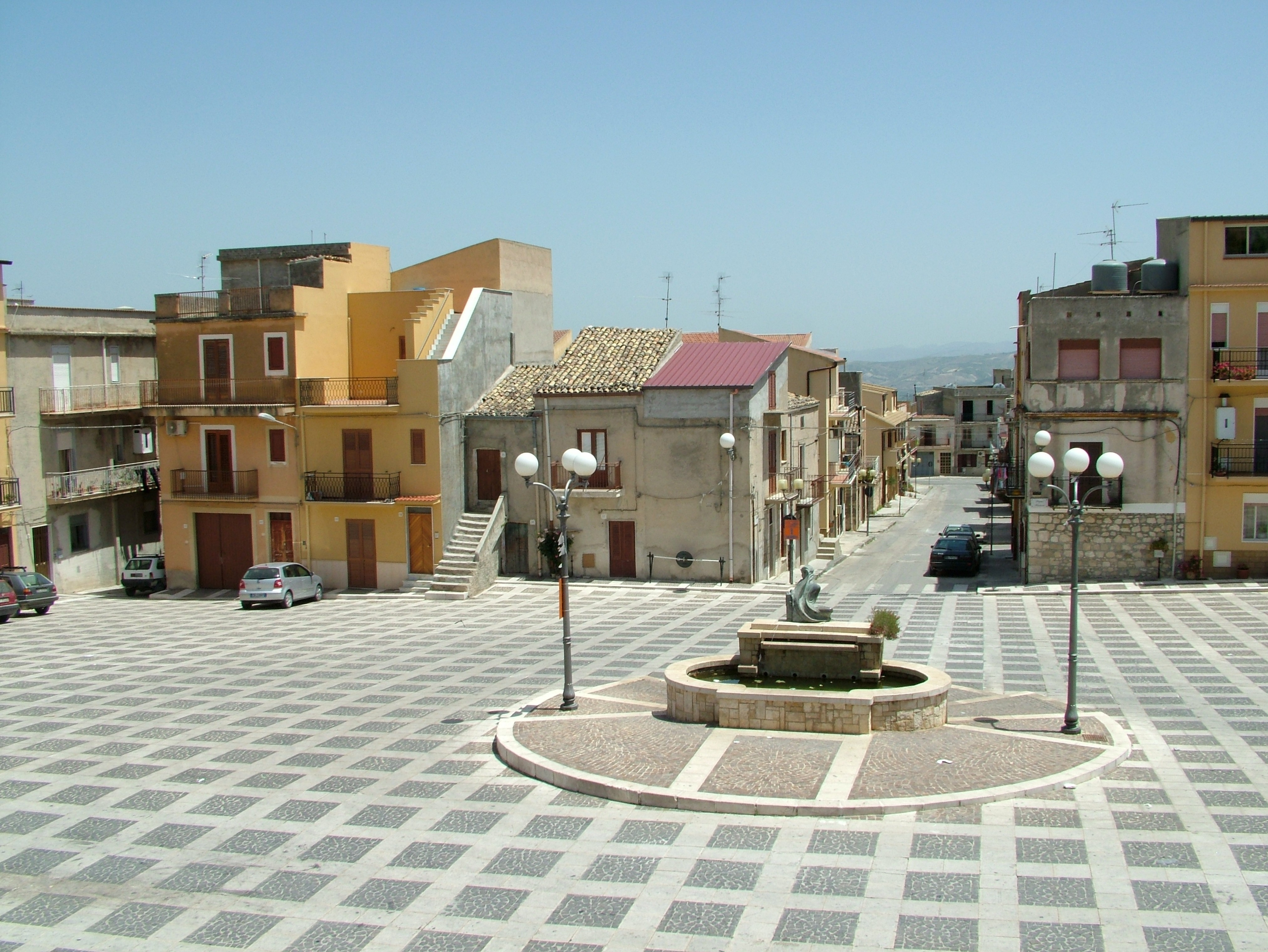
piazza Fontana, Sant'Anna, Caltabellotta subtown

Caltabellotta has been identified with the ancient Sicani town of Triocala (Τριόκαλα), a name meaning "three fine things" in Greek.

The town was the location of the Peace of Caltabellotta (1302) which ended the War of the Sicilian Vespers.

== Demographics ==
As of 2026, the population is 3,065, of which 48.1% are male, and 51.9% are female. Minors make up 11.7% of the population, and seniors make up 31.3%.

Historical population

Year	Pop.	±%
1861	6,229	—
1871	6,570	+5.5%
1881	6,891	+4.9%
1901	7,462	+8.3%
1911	7,302	−2.1%
1921	7,098	−2.8%
1931	6,561	−7.6%
1936	6,936	+5.7%

Year	Pop.	±%
1951	7,311	+5.4%
1961	6,894	−5.7%
1971	5,526	−19.8%
1981	5,267	−4.7%
1991	5,059	−3.9%
2001	4,448	−12.1%
2011	3,907	−12.2%
2021	3,238	−17.1%

Source: ISTAT

=== Immigration ===
As of 2025, of the known countries of birth of 3,022 residents, the most numerous are: Italy (2,817 – 93.2%), Romania (83 – 2.7%), Germany (80 – 2.6%).

== Notable people ==
- Joseph Costa — photographer, founder of the National Press Photographers Association, born in Caltabellotta
- Pedro de Luna - Peralta y Medici-Salviati
- Flavius Mithridates

== Sources ==
- Trigilia, Melchiorre (2011). S. Pellegrino di Caltabellotta. Caltabellotta.
