= Cornificia gens =

Plebeian family at Rome

The gens Cornificia was a plebeian family at Rome. No persons of this name occur until the last century of the Republic; and the first who obtained any of the higher honours of the state was Quintus Cornificius, praetor in 66 BC.

== Origin ==
The Cornificii seem to have come originally from Rhegium. On coins the name is written Cornuficius, which is also the form used by Cassius Dio.

== Praenomina used ==
The only praenomina associated with the Cornificii are Quintus, Lucius, and Publius.

== Members ==
This list includes abbreviated praenomina. For an explanation of this practice, see filiation.

- Cornificius, secretary of Verres during his praetorship, 74 BC.
- Quintus Cornificius, praetor in 66 BC, had been one of the judges at the trial of Verres, and tribune of the plebs the following year. Although an unsuccessful rival of Cicero's for the consulship of 63, he assisted Cicero in suppressing the conspiracy of Catiline.
- Quintus Cornificius Q. f., one of Caesar's officers during the Civil War, and a man of letters much admired by Cicero. He was proscribed by the Second Triumvirate and fell in battle.
- Cornificia, a famous poet. Probably sister of Quintus.
- Lucius Cornificius, one of the accusers of Milo after the death of Clodius.
- Publius Cornificius, a senator mentioned by Asconius, who may be the same as the accuser of Milo.
- Lucius Cornificius (L. f.), accused Marcus Junius Brutus of Caesar's murder, and afterward one of the generals of Octavianus. He held the consulship in 35 BC, and may have been identical with the rhetorician and/or the poet Cornificius.

== See also ==
- List of Roman gentes
