= Battle of Histria =

Battle between the Scythian Bastarnae and Romans led by Gaius Antonius Hybrida

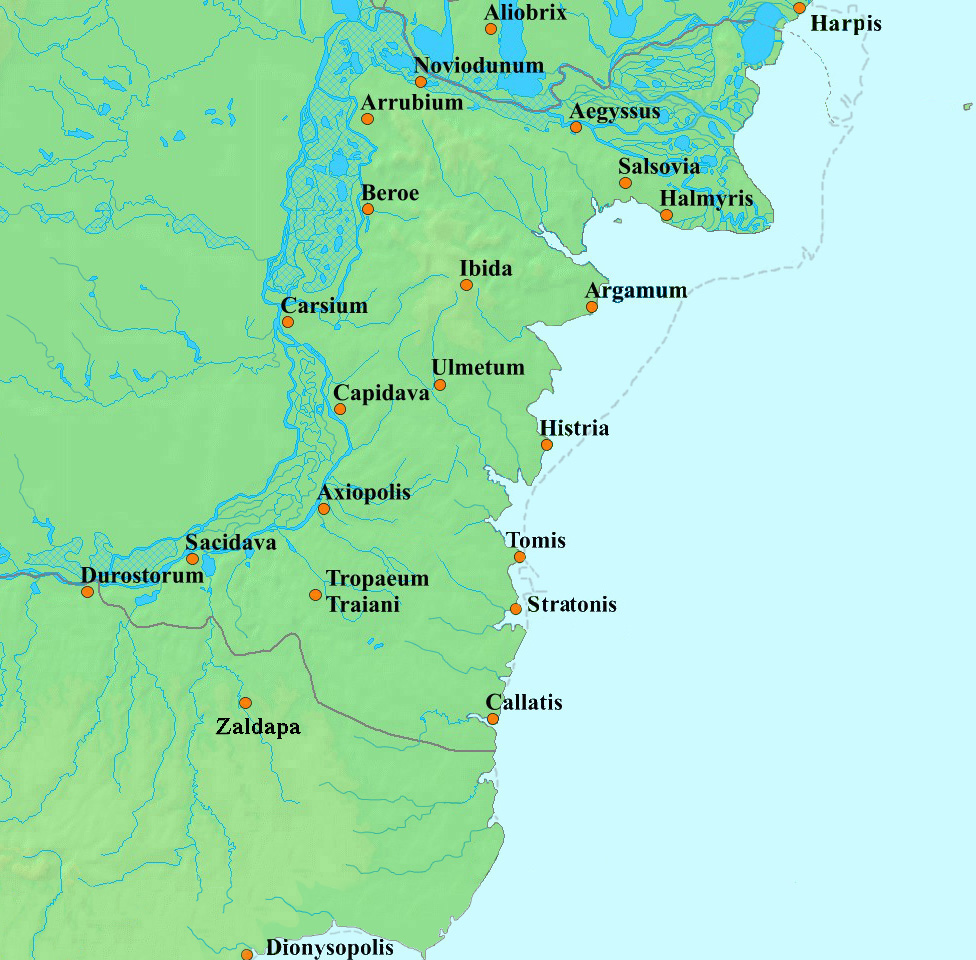
- A map of Scythia Minor showing the ancient Greek polis of Histria, in relation to other polises, where the battle took place.
Location	Near the Greek polis of Histria
Result	Bastarnaean and Scythians victory

Belligerents
Bastarnae Scythians	Roman Republic

Commanders and leaders
Unknown Bastarnae king, possibly Burebista	Gaius Antonius Hybrida

Strength
Unknown number of cavalry	Large infantry and cavalry force

Casualties and losses
Unknown	Entire infantry unit

The Battle of Histria, c. 62–61 BC, was fought between the Bastarnae peoples of Scythia Minor and the Roman Consul (63 BC) Gaius Antonius Hybrida. The Bastarnae emerged victorious from the battle after successfully launching a surprise attack on the Roman troops; Hybrida escaped alongside his cavalry forces leaving behind the infantry to be massacred by the Bastarnian-Scythian attackers.

In the late 2nd Century BC, the Pontic king Mithridates VI Eupator began a campaign of expansion around the Black Sea and into the interior of Asia Minor in modern-day Turkey. His campaigns led to the subjugation of the Bosporan Kingdom, Scythia Minor including the Black Sea Greek polises of Histria and Tomis, as well as the provinces of Bithynia, Cappadocia and much of Asia Minor. These campaigns led to conflict with the Roman Republic, the outcome of which was the return of Bithynia and Cappadocia to their respective rulers. The Roman Republic then urged the king of Bithynia to invade Pontus with the intent of seizing loot to return to Rome. Mithridates in retaliation conquered Bithynia and Cappadocia once again and began massacring the Roman and Italic populations of Asia Minor with the assistance of the Greeks in what is referred to as the Asiatic Vespers. This led to two further wars between the Roman Republic and Pontus which ended with the death of Mithridates VI, the end of revolts in Greece, Macedonia, and Asia Minor among others, and the subjugation of Armenia.

During this period, Gaius Antonius Hybrida was sent alongside Sulla to Macedonia to assist in the First Mithridatic War in around 87 BC. After the end of the First Mithridatic War, while Sulla returned to Rome, Hybrida stayed in Macedonia levying contributions for himself. He was later recalled to Rome. First to face criminal charges in 76 BC resulting in his expulsion from the Senate, and then again in 63 BC to be elected to the position of Roman Consul and to fight the campaign against Catiline. From here he returned to Macedonia where he began incurring into the territory of Lower and Upper Moesia. He was to be attacked and defeated twice during this time, first by the Dardanians in an unknown location and then second near Histria by a coalition of Bastarnian and Scythian peoples, who may have been under the command of the Dacian king Burebista.

Burebista himself took command of the Bastarnae, Scythian, Dacian and Getae peoples sometime between 82 BC and 60 BC. His rule led to a vast expansion of the Dacian kingdom, as far north as the Bug River at Olbia, south into Thrace, east along the Black Sea and west into Moesia and Pannonia. During the civil war between Pompey and Caesar, Pompey sought the assistance of Burebista, however, the Battle of Pharsalus ended any chance of an alliance between the two. Caesar himself had plans to lead a campaign against Dacia, however, both Caesar and Burebista were assassinated in 44 BC and Dacia itself broke apart into several smaller pieces soon after. The Dacians later enjoyed a resurgence in 85–86 AD under the rule of Decebalus, but, were again eventually defeated in 106 by Emperor Trajan who then turned a large portion Dacia into a province of Rome; Roman Dacia.

== Background ==
=== Mithridates VI Eupator ===
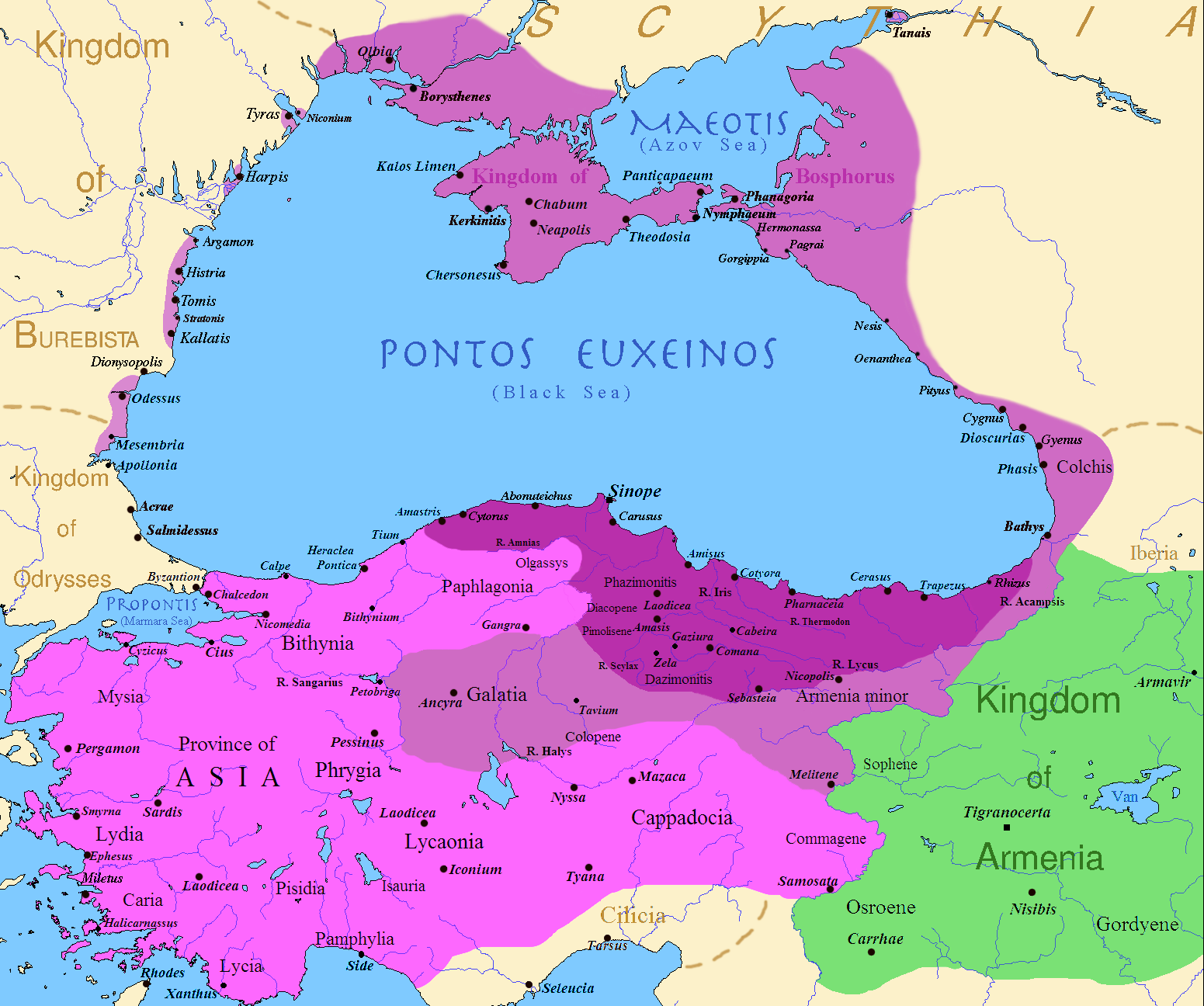
Extent of the Pontic Kingdom under Mithridates VI Eupator. Before the reign of Mithridates (Darkest purple), after his conquests (purple), after his conquests in the Mithridatic Wars (pink).

Mithridates VI Eupator, or Mithridates VI of Pontus, came to rule over the Pontic kingdom in 113 BC at the age of 11, when his father was assassinated. The Pontic kingdom is roughly located in the north-eastern quadrant of modern-day Turkey bordering against the Black Sea. Mithridates VI began his career of military expansion first to the east, in modern-day Georgia, and soon after followed the coast of the Black Sea to the north. Around 108 BC the Bosporan Kingdom was also peacefully incorporated into Mithridates VI growing Pontic Kingdom when Pairisades V handed its control to Mithridates VI. By 100 BC the Scythians had been subdued by Mithridates, here he recruited Scythian cavalry which he employed into his later campaigns to the south. Mithridates' influence extended onto the north of the Black Sea and included the cities of Odessos, Nesebar, Histria (Istros), Tomis, Kallatis and Byzantion.

Having subjugated Scythia, Mithridates turned his attention to the south and began conquering the neighbouring lands of Bithynia and Cappadocia while the Romans were embroiled in the Social War (91–88 BC), Rome attempted to force Mithridates into releasing the territory back to their respective kings urging the king of Bithynia to retaliate by invading Pontus and seizing loot to give to Rome. By 90 BC, however, Mithridates had successfully defeated the king before attacking Pergamon and killing a Roman envoy. During 89–88 BC Mithridates further expanded his territory by peacefully incorporating many Greek city-states within Asia Minor into his kingdom and Greece itself sought his assistance in freeing itself from Roman rule. In 88 BC, Mithridates had the Romans and Italic peoples residing in his kingdom and those that were within Asia Minor and Greece, including at Ephesus, Pergamon, Adramyttium, Caunus, Tralles and others, massacred in what is now called the "Asiatic Vespers".

The Roman response to this was immediate and Mithridates was defeated in 85 BC by Sulla and pushed out of Greece the following year in the First Mithridatic War. Kohn challenges this assertion slightly, suggesting that a Roman General, Fimbria, had defeated Mithridates in 84 BC while Sulla and his army defeated the Greeks, who had allied themselves with Mithridates, in 85 BC. A few years later a Roman General Murena invaded Mithridate's land, sparking the Second Mithridatic War, in the Kizil Irmak River area. Mithridates emerged victorious in this encounter around 82 BC. During the 70s BC Mithridates came to further blows with Rome now against the Roman General Lucullus who forced Mithridates out of Pontus. Mithridates was now forced to flee to Armenia where he sought refuge with his son-in-law, King Tigranes I "the Great" of Armenia, who after refusing to surrender to the Romans was also invaded by Lucullus and his army. Tigranocerta fell to the Romans during this campaign after a battle in the autumn of 69 BC, the following year Lucullus attempted to continue the subjugation of Armenia, however, his army was unprepared for the mountainous region and climate. A second battle occurred at Artaxata in 68 BC where Mithridates was again defeated. Despite this Lucullus and his army was forced to retreat to the Euphrates Valley. In 66 BC, Lucullus was recalled to Rome and Pompey took over the command. Armenia was subdued the same year. Finally in 64–63 BC, Pompey pushed Mithridates into the Crimean peninsula where he committed suicide ending the Third Mithridatic War.

=== Gaius Antonius Hybrida ===
In 87 BC, Gaius Antonius Hybrida accompanied Sulla during his campaign to Greece as a military tribune. Sulla had left Rome, after ending an uprising in Rome, to face the Mithridatic Greek armies commanded by Archelus and Aristion in Greece and laid siege to Athens. Afterwards, while Sulla returned to Rome, Hybrida remained behind with a small cavalry contingent to levy contributions from the province of Achaea. In 76 BC, Caesar had Hybrida prosecuted for his offences, but he failed to appear and the charges were dropped until he was ousted from the Senate for his crimes in 70 BC. In 64 BC, Hybrida was nominated for the position of consul alongside Lucius Sergius Catilina and Cicero. Cicero and Hybrida were elected to hold the position for the following year. Cicero made a deal with Hybrida; Hybrida was to be given the governorship-elect of the province of Macedonia, which was supposed to have been Cicero's at the end of the consulship, in exchange for granting Cicero sole power to rule over the Roman Republic. In late 63 BC, Hybrida went into Etruria with the intention of assisting the praetor Quintus Metellus Celer in capturing Catiline and his men, but handed command of the army to his Lieutenant, Marcus Petreius. He claimed to be ill, though this may have been a fabrication on his part. Petreius met Catiline, and approximately 3,000 of his men, in battle and emerged victorious after destroying Catiline's army and killing Catiline. Hybrida, having adhered to the agreement with Cicero and the Senate, was given control of Macedonia which he pillaged and robbed its provincials. He also incurred upon barbarian lands in Lower and Upper Moesia.

== Battle ==
The battle of Histria took place c. 62–61 BC, between the Bastarnae and Scythians and the Roman Consul (63 BC) Gaius Antonius Hybrida near the ancient town of Histria. Hybrida had, according to Dio, 'inflicted many injuries' against his subjects during his tenure as Governor of Macedonia. He sent incursions into Upper and Lower Moesia, where he and his men stole from the 'Dardanians and their neighbours' before retreating away in anticipation of their retaliation. Hybrida pretended to manoeuvre his cavalry but instead fled, leaving his men to be surrounded by enemy infantry and forced out without any plunder.

Hybrida tried a similar tactic at Histria but was defeated by the Bastarnian Scythians. Rome had been under the impression that the region had been conquered with Mithridates defeat, but while Hybrida and his men marched to occupy the city of Histria, they were attacked by a large cavalry force of Bastarnae. Hybrida and his cavalry force detached from the main column and retreated from the batlle, leaving the Roman infantry to be massacred.

== Aftermath ==
=== Burebista ===
Various accounts set different starting dates for Burebista's reign. Jordanes, in his work "the origin and deeds of the goths" writes that Burebista was king during the time of Sulla, without an explicit date. Sulla was appointed dictator by the Senate in late 82 BC or early 81 BC. Grumeza, and Hitchins set Burebista's rule to begin in 82 BC. Jones and Ereira suggest that Burebista came to reign over the Dacians around 70 BC. Bunson, Middleton, and Schmitts suggest that Burebista's reign started around 60 BC.

Burebista's rule is marked by the unity of the Dacian and Getae peoples and campaigns of expansion throughout the Danube. His campaign of expansion led to the destruction of the Boii, at the time led by Critasiros, and the Taurisci, residing in an area around modern-day Czech Republic and Slovakia. Further, Burebista led campaigns against the Celts living in Thrace and Illyria, which were likely the Scordisci, raided throughout Thrace and into Roman Macedonia, and subjugated the Greek polis', including Histria, Tomis, Apollonia, Odessos, and Dionysopolis along the Black Sea. To the north Burebista's campaigns led to the capture and control of the Greek merchant city of Olbia/Olbiopolis extending the border of the Dacian kingdom to the western bank of the Bug River. In Pannonia, the Dacians took over the fortified cities of Zemplin and Židovar and attacked the Celtic tribes that had expanded their lands towards the Black Sea. The Anarati, Pannoni, and Eravisci were also brought under the Dacian rule. Despite these conquests, the Breuci and Sagestani tribes remained defiant closing access to the Adriatic.

In 48 BC, Pompey sought Burebista's assistance in his war against Caesar, but the Battle of Pharsalus ended any chance of an alliance between the two. Caesar intended to lead a campaign against Burebista and the Dacians, as part of a larger campaign planned to go through to Parthia, but this plan did not come to fruition as in 44 BC, both Caesar and Burebista were assassinated. After Burebista's death, a revolt led to the disintegration of the Dacian kingdom into four parts, and, by the time of Augustus, into five parts.

=== Subjugation of Dacia ===
Between Tiberius' and Domitian's reigns as Emperor, Dacian activity was minimal. They had divided into smaller tribes following Burebista's death and posed no serious threat to the Roman Empire until the ascension of Decebalus to the throne in 85–86 AD. Decebalus, like Burebista, successfully united the Dacians and earned a reputation as a competent leader and military commander. His rule saw raiding into Moesia, Illyria, and Macedonia by the Dacians. The scale and intensity of which prompted Domitian to send the praetorian prefect Fuscus with a large contingent force to combat the raiders. Decebalus attempted to negotiate peace with Domitian, but the overconfident emperor rejected the offer. In the end, Decebalus set up an ambush which saw Fuscus and his forces massacred. This period of Dacian dominance ended after Trajan became emperor in 98. Trajan waged two wars against the Dacians in 101–102 and 105–106. The first war ended in a temporary peace that was not respected by the Dacians resulting in a second war that ended with a permanent defeat of the Dacians, the death of Decebalus, and a substantial portion of Dacia being turned into a Roman province.
