= Catiline His Conspiracy =

Work by Ben Jonson

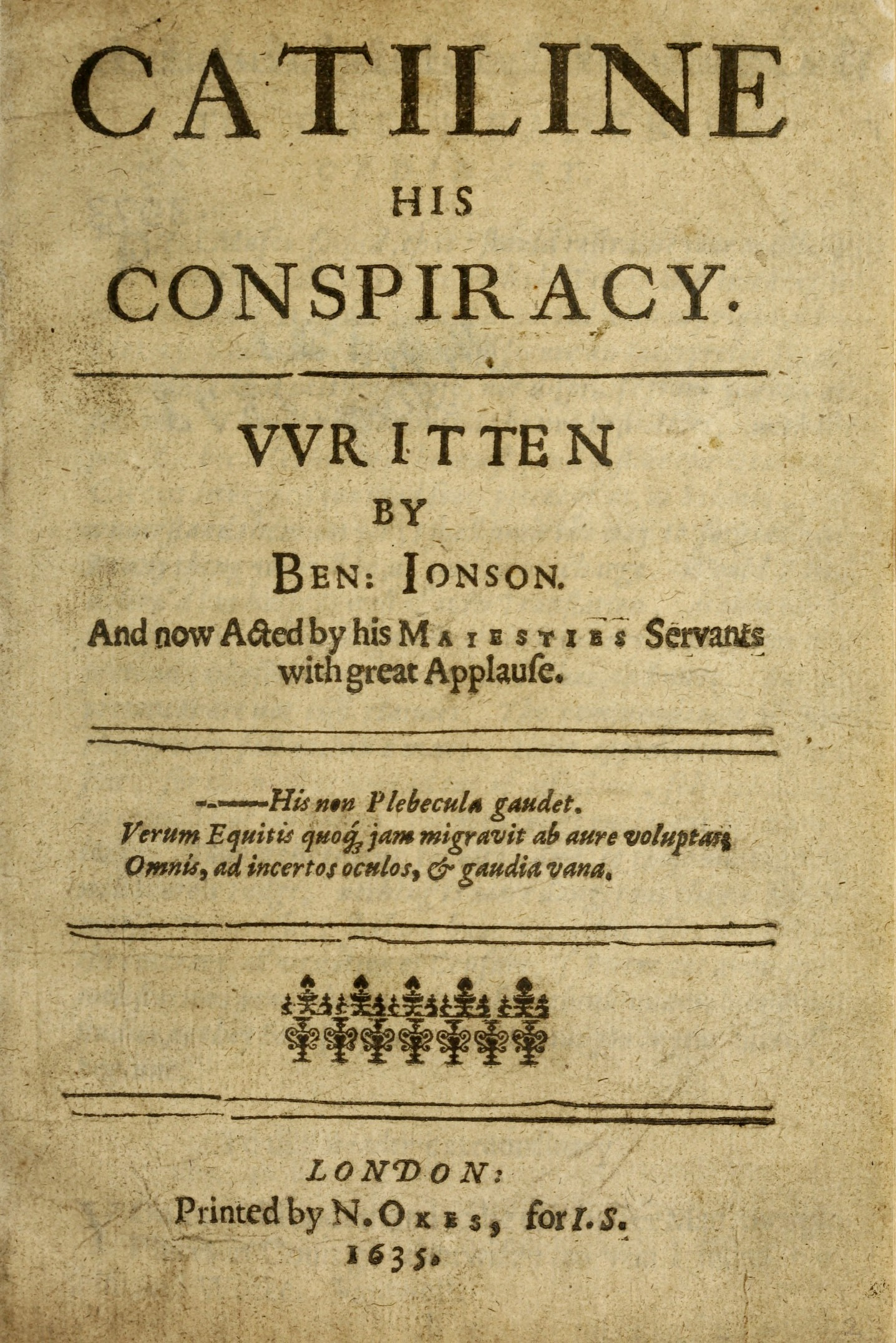
Title page of the 1635 quarto

Catiline His Conspiracy, 1611, is a Jacobean tragedy written by Ben Jonson. It is one of the two Roman tragedies that Jonson hoped would cement his dramatic achievement and reputation, the other being Sejanus His Fall (1603).

== Background ==
Jonson, a devout Catholic convert, wrote Catiline in the historical context of the Gunpowder Plot and surrounding events. Written when he was already under suspicion of "popperie and treason", the play explores the relationship of law to prerogative and treason to tyranny.

Jonson was not the first playwright of his era to dramatize the story of Catiline. Stephen Gosson in his "School of Abuse" (1579) praised a play called Catiline's Conspiracies, which was acted by Leicester's Men at The Theatre some time between 1576 and 1579. A Catiline (either Gosson's or another play, author unknown) was acted at the home of William Cecil, 1st Lord Burghley, on 16 January 1588. In 1598 or 1599, the Diary of Philip Henslowe records an advance payment of five shillings to Henry Chettle, for a play titled Catiline's Conspiracy—though Chettle appears never to have completed writing it.

== Publication ==
The play was first published in quarto in 1611 by the stationer Walter Burre, prefaced with commendatory verses by Francis Beaumont, John Fletcher and Nathan Field. It was reprinted the 1616 folio of Jonson's works. The folio text states that Catiline was first performed in 1611 by the King's Men, and lists the cast as: Richard Burbage, John Heminges, Alexander Cooke, Henry Condell, John Lowin, John Underwood, William Ostler, Nicholas Tooley, Richard Robinson and William Ecclestone.

== Story ==
As its title indicates, the play recounts the story of Catiline, the Roman politician and conspirator of the 1st century B.C. Besides Catiline appear other historical figures such as Julius Caesar, Sempronia, Fulvia, Crassus, Cicero and Aurelia Orestilla.

== Reception ==
That the play was not a popular success is indicated by Jonson's reproachful preface to the published edition. Thomas Rymer praised the play's subject matter but condemned Jonson's violations of decorum. The Guardian states that: "Although booed off stage at its 1611 premiere, it became a great favourite in its day, but has not been staged since the 17th century".

John Dryden introduced the traditional prescriptive rule against preposition stranding in English in criticising a phrase from this play: "The maws, and dens of beasts could not receive / the bodies that those souls were frighted from."

In 2011, the play was edited and translated for the first time in Italian.
