= Lucius Calpurnius Bestia =

Lucius Calpurnius Bestia may refer to:

- Lucius Calpurnius Bestia (consul 111 BC)
- Lucius Calpurnius Bestia (exiled 90 BC)
- Lucius Calpurnius Bestia (tribune 62 BC)
- Lucius Calpurnius Bestia (aedile 57 BC)
