= Aurelia Orestilla =

Roman woman of the 1st century BCE

Aurelia Orestilla, daughter of the very wealthy Gnaeus Aufidius Orestes, was woman of ancient Rome chiefly remembered for her association with the politician Catiline, who in 65 BCE attempted to take control of the Roman Senate in what came to be called the Catilinarian conspiracy.

Contemporaneous Roman writers on the opposing side — chiefly Cicero and Sallust — write of her disparagingly as a «beautiful but profligate» woman. Sallust writes that «no good man ever complimented her on anything besides her beauty».

An anecdote originally related by these authors but repeated throughout history is that when Catiline proposed marriage, Aurelia objected on the grounds that he had an adult son from a previous marriage. Catiline was said to have killed his son with poison to remove the impediment to that marriage, with the implication being that Catiline killed his son of out of lust for the wanton Aurelia. First-century BCE historian Sallust implies the scheme was Aurelia's idea to begin with. First-century historian Valerius Maximus wrote that Catiline lit his marriage torch for Aurelia from his son's funeral pyre, and describes the situation as having been caused by «wicked libido». This is notable as an attempt to further malign Catiline, as marrying for lust was considered contemptible in Roman society (whereas marrying for money was not).

This anecdote of Aurelia's role in what writers claimed was Catiline's son's murder was used at the time, and for centuries later, to paint both Catiline and Aurelia in an unflattering light (in the same work, Cicero also accuses Catiline of fratricide and incest). Almost two millennia later, Aurelia Orestilla continued to be used as a character of the scheming woman, as well as of the wicked stepmother, as in for example Catiline His Conspiracy by 17th-century dramatist Ben Jonson (who uses Sallust as his primary historical source), and the play Catilina by the 18th century poet Prosper Jolyot de Crébillon, and the play of the same name by the 19th century writer Alexandre Dumas, in which Catiline and Aurelia drink from goblets of human blood to seal their bargain.

Aurelia Orestilla had herself already been married, as she had a daughter by a previous husband. Her daughter was betrothed to Quintus Cornificius in 49 BCE.

Catiline appears to have felt genuine affection for Aurelia. In exile, shortly before his death, the doomed Catiline wrote a letter to his friend Quintus Lutatius Catulus Capitolinus asking him to take care of his wife.
