= Fulvia (mistress of Quintus Curius) =

1st-century BCE Roman noblewoman

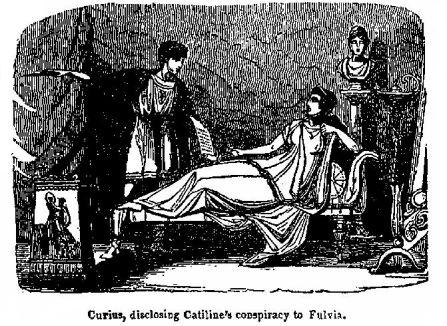
- Years active: 1st century BCE
- Known for: Revealing the Catilinarian conspiracy to Cicero
- Partner: Quintus Curius
- Family: Fulvia gens

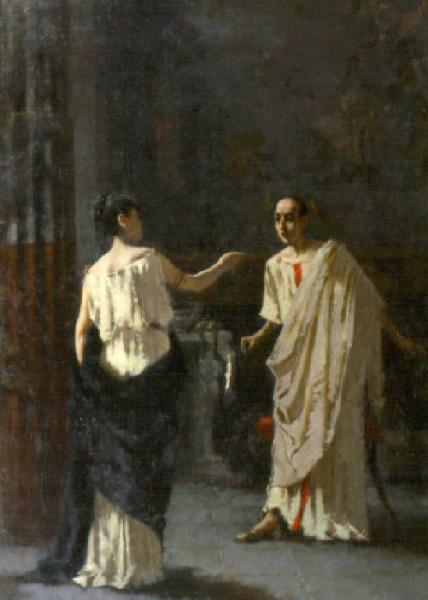
The depiction of Fulvia revealing the conspiracy to Cicero by Francesco Filippini, 1879

Fulvia was a 1st century BCE Roman noblewoman who revealed the Catilinarian conspiracy to Cicero.

== Sallust's account ==
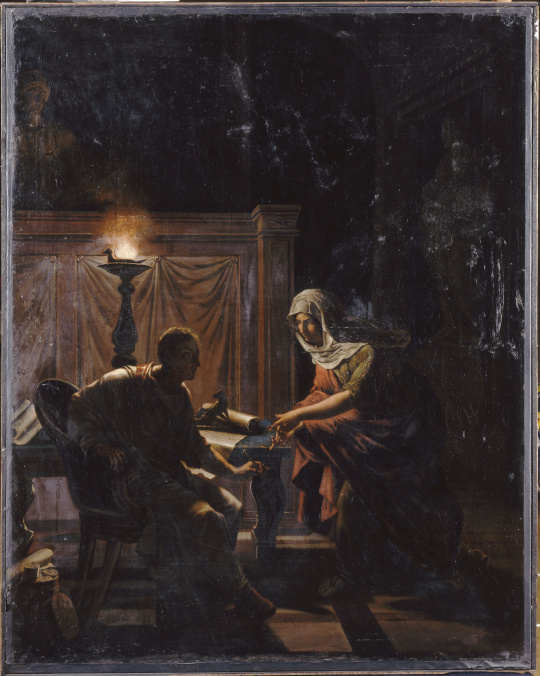
The depiction of Fulvia revealing the plot to Cicero by Nicolas-André Monsiau, 1827

Fulvia, according to the 1st-century BCE Roman historian Sallust, had entered into an illicit affair with a former senator named Quintus Curius, who was also involved in the Catilinarian conspiracy.

Sallust writes that Curius had fallen out of favor with Fulvia due to his poverty inhibiting lavish spending, which led Curius to become boastful and to make grand promises to her, but also to threaten Fulvia with violence should she disobey him. Fulvia learned of his destitution, but also the reason for his boasts, and spread news of the Catilinarian plot throughout Rome, although without mentioning Curius by name. Sallust writes that these rumors helped propel public support for the transfer of the consulship to Cicero, as — once the Roman people had been made aware of the danger posed by Catiline — they were more willing to ignore their distaste for allowing a novus homo such as Cicero to hold consular office. Later, Catiline sought the consulship once more and hoped to manipulate Cicero's co-consul Gaius Antonius Hybrida for his own ambitions, yet his plans were foiled when Cicero, after having made "many promises," received information regarding Catiline's devices from Curius but "through Fulvia" ("per Fulviam"). Later, Curius, having learned of the attempted assassination plot targeting Cicero, warned him, also "through Fulvia" ("per Fulviam").

In the text, Sallust emphasizes the high status of Fulvia; she is one of only five named individuals in the entirety of the Bellum Catilinae described with the adjective nobilis ("noble"). According to the classicist Matthew Loar, the elevated status of Fulvia, and her association with the influential Fulvia gens, also conferred on Curius an aggrandized rank by association. Ultimately, Loar suggests that Sallust had sought to convey a supposed decline in the character of the Roman gentes, which he achieved in part by highlighting and defaming prominent Roman families and individuals. According to the classicist Therese Fuhrer, Fulvia is herself described with traits that would fit the Roman image of a decadent elite; she is involved in an illegal extramarital affair and deeply concerned with the promise of wealth from Curius. Sallust otherwise characterizes women as debaucherous, writing that Roman noblewomen were bribed into supporting Catiline's cause out of a desire to fund their extravagant lifestyles. Fulvia, though portrayed as instrumental in facilitating Cicero's political success, is nevertheless depicted by Sallust as greedy — she is presumably, within the narrative of the text, bought by Cicero to deliver information from Curtius.

== Diodorus Siculus's account ==
Another historian, the 1st century BCE historian Diodorus Siculus, records a similar story to that of Sallust, though he does not explicitly mention either Curius or Fulvia by name. Diodorus records that one of the conspirators had been insulted by a girl with whom he was in love, and — in response — he had remarked that, in a few days, her life would be within his power. Later, whilst they were together and he was intoxicated, she pretended to greatly enjoy his company and requested that he reveal the meaning of his threat. Upon learning of the conspiracy, she at first remained visibly calm and feigned compliance with the schemers, though — the following morning — she revealed the details of the plan to Terentia, the wife of Cicero. In Diodorus's account, Fulvia is portrayed as more conforming to ancient Roman gender roles than in Sallust's account. Sallust describes Fulvia directly approaching Cicero himself, which may violate the Roman taboo against politically outspoken women. However, Diodorus depicts Fulvia as merely approaching Terentia, who then spoke with Cicero. It would be more socially acceptable for Cicero to speak with his wife than with Fulvia, a courtesan.

== Other accounts ==
Appian, a 2nd century CE historian, writes that Fulvia, supposedly "a woman of some distinction", was the lover of a man named Quintus Curius, who had been previously expelled from the Senate on account of misconduct. In this version of the story, Curius declares to Fulvia that he will soon be in a position of great power, hoping this boast will impress her. However, Fulvia still reveals the scheme to Cicero when Catiline leaves for the camp of Manlius to join his army. The 1st century CE Greek author Plutarch records that Fulvia approached Cicero at night and warned him to be on guard against assassins.

== See also ==
- List of distinguished Roman women

== Bibliography ==
- Fuhrer, Therese (8 October 2018). "On the Economy of "Sending and Receiving Information" in Roman Historiography". In Harrison, Stephen; Frangoulidis, Stavros; Papanghelis, Theodore D. (eds.). Intratextuality and Latin Literature. De Gruyter. doi:10.1515/9783110611021. ISBN 978-3-11-061102-1.
- Loar, Matthew (1 July 2019). "Sempronia, Q. Curius, and the Decline of Roman Gentes in Sallust's Bellum Catilinae". Histos. 13. doi:10.29173/histos421. ISSN 2046-5963.
- Pagán, Victoria Emma (2005). "Conspiracy Narratives in Roman History". De Gruyter Brill. doi:10.7560/705616. ISBN 9780292797185.
