= Quintus Cornificius =

Quintus Cornificius (died 42 BC) was an ancient Roman of senatorial rank from the gens Cornificia. He was a general, orator and poet, a friend of Catullus and a correspondent of Cicero. He was also an augur. He wrote a now lost epyllion titled Glaucus.

During the Roman civil war of 49–45 BC, Cornificius sided with Julius Caesar against Gnaeus Pompeius. As quaestor pro praetore for Illyricum in 48 BC, he recovered the province and defended it against the attacks of Pompeius' fleet. In 46, he was sent to Cilicia, probably as legatus pro praetore, and then to Syria, where he prosecuted the war against Quintus Caecilius Bassus. In 45 BC, he was made a praetor and in the summer of 44 BC, after the assassination of Caesar, he was appointed governor of the province of Africa Vetus by the senate.

Later in 46 BC, the senate, under the influence of Marcus Antonius, appointed Gaius Calvisius Sabinus governor of Africa Vetus, but Cornificius refused to give up the province. In 43 BC, the Second Triumvirate, including Antonius, had him proscribed and his province given to Titus Sextius. He was defeated and killed in battle near Utica in 42 BC.

A monument in Rome to Cornificius' sister Cornificia, also a poet, reads: CORNIFICIA Q. F. CAMERI Q. CORNIFICIUS Q. F. FRATER PR. AUGUR (Cornificia, the daughter of Quintus, wife of Camerius, her brother Quintus Cornificius, son of Quintus, praetor and augur).

At some point he was betrothed to the daughter of Aurelia Orestilla, widow of Catiline.
