= Marcus Sergius Silus =

Roman General

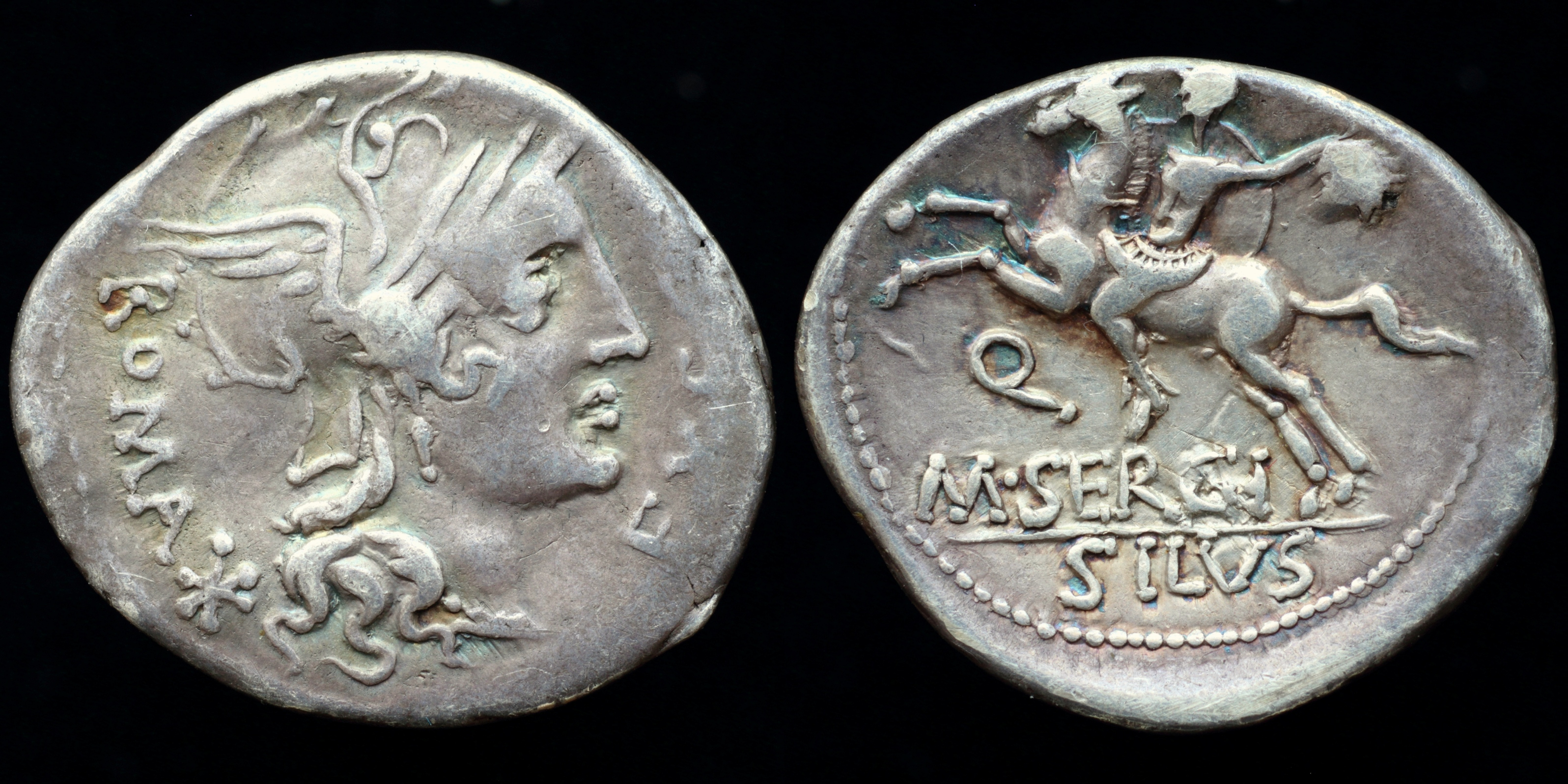
Denarius depicting the goddess Roma wearing a winged helmet on the obverse, and on the reverse Marcus Sergius as a horseman displaying the head he severed, issued 116-115 BC by a descendant of the same name

Marcus Sergius was a Roman general during the Second Punic War (218 to 201 BC). He is famed in prosthetics circles as the first documented user of a prosthetic hand. The metal hand was constructed to allow him to hold his shield in battle.

A description of Marcus Sergius is found in the seventh book of Pliny's Natural History, published in AD 77:

Nobody - at least in my opinion - can rightly rank any man above Marcus Sergius, although his great-grandson Catiline shames his name. In his second campaign Sergius lost his right hand. In two campaigns he was wounded twenty-three times, with the result that he had no use in either hand or either foot: only his spirit remained intact. Although disabled, Sergius served in many subsequent campaigns. He was twice captured by Hannibal - no ordinary foe- from whom twice he escaped, although kept in chains and shackles every day for twenty months. He fought four times with only his left hand, while two horses he was riding were stabbed beneath him.

He had a right hand made of iron for him and, going into battle with this bound to his arm, raised the siege of Cremona, saved Placentia and captured twelve enemy camps in Gaul - all of which exploits were confirmed by the speech he made as praetor when his colleagues tried to debar him as infirm from the sacrifices. What piles of wreaths he would have amassed in the face of a different enemy!
