= Gnaeus Aufidius Orestes =

Gnaeus Aufidius Orestes (died 1st century BC) was a Roman politician who was elected consul in 71 BC.

== Biography ==
Originally born into the Orestes branch of the plebeian gens Aurelia, Aufidius Orestes was adopted by the elderly Gnaeus Aufidius, a Roman historian. He was an unsuccessful candidate for the plebeian tribunate, but was elected to the post of aedile by or before 79 BC.

In 77 BC, he was elected praetor urbanus. His period in office was contentious for at least one legal proceeding where, after he had ruled in favour of a castrated priest of Magna Mater who had been named as the heir of a deceased freedman, his ruling was overturned by the ruling consul Mamercus Aemilius Lepidus Livianus in favour of the freedman's former patron. The senate then passed a senatus consultum which forbad the eunuch from asking any of the other praetors for help. Although this was limited to one case, it is possible that the consul used his full imperium maius to oversee all of Orestes' legal cases for the rest of the year.

After serving his year in office, he was appointed by lot to possibly either Cisalpine Gaul or Transalpine Gaul. He was then elected as consul alongside Publius Cornelius Lentulus Sura in 71 BC. According to Cicero, Orestes' elections as praetor and consul were due in part to the expensive and extravagant games he held while he was aedile. Following his period in office, Aufidius Orestes refused to accept a proconsular command or other promagisterial appointment.

== Family ==
Aufidius Orestes had at least one daughter, Aurelia Orestilla, who was the third wife of the notorious senator Catiline. According to the historian Sallust, Orestes' wife had an adulterous affair.

== Sources ==
- Broughton, T. Robert S., The Magistrates of the Roman Republic, Vol. II (1952)
- Smith, William, Dictionary of Greek and Roman Biography and Mythology, Vol III (1867)

Political offices
Preceded by Lucius Gellius Publicola and Gnaeus Cornelius Lentulus Clodianus	Consul of the Roman Republic; 71 BC with Publius Cornelius Lentulus Sura	Succeeded by Gnaeus Pompeius Magnus and Marcus Licinius Crassus
