= Marcus Caeparius =

Marcus Caeparius (died 63 BC) was a Roman politician who participated in the Catiline Conspiracy.

He came from the Latin town of Tarracina and was preparing to travel to Apulia in order to incite a revolt among the slaves there when the conspiracy was discovered and its participants detained. Having heard about this, he attempted to flee from Rome, but was apprehended during his escape and brought back to the city, where he was committed to the custody of the senator Gnaeus Terentius. He was executed along with the other conspirators in the Tullianum by strangulation.
