= Battle of Pistoria =

Roman battle

- Part of Catilinarian conspiracy
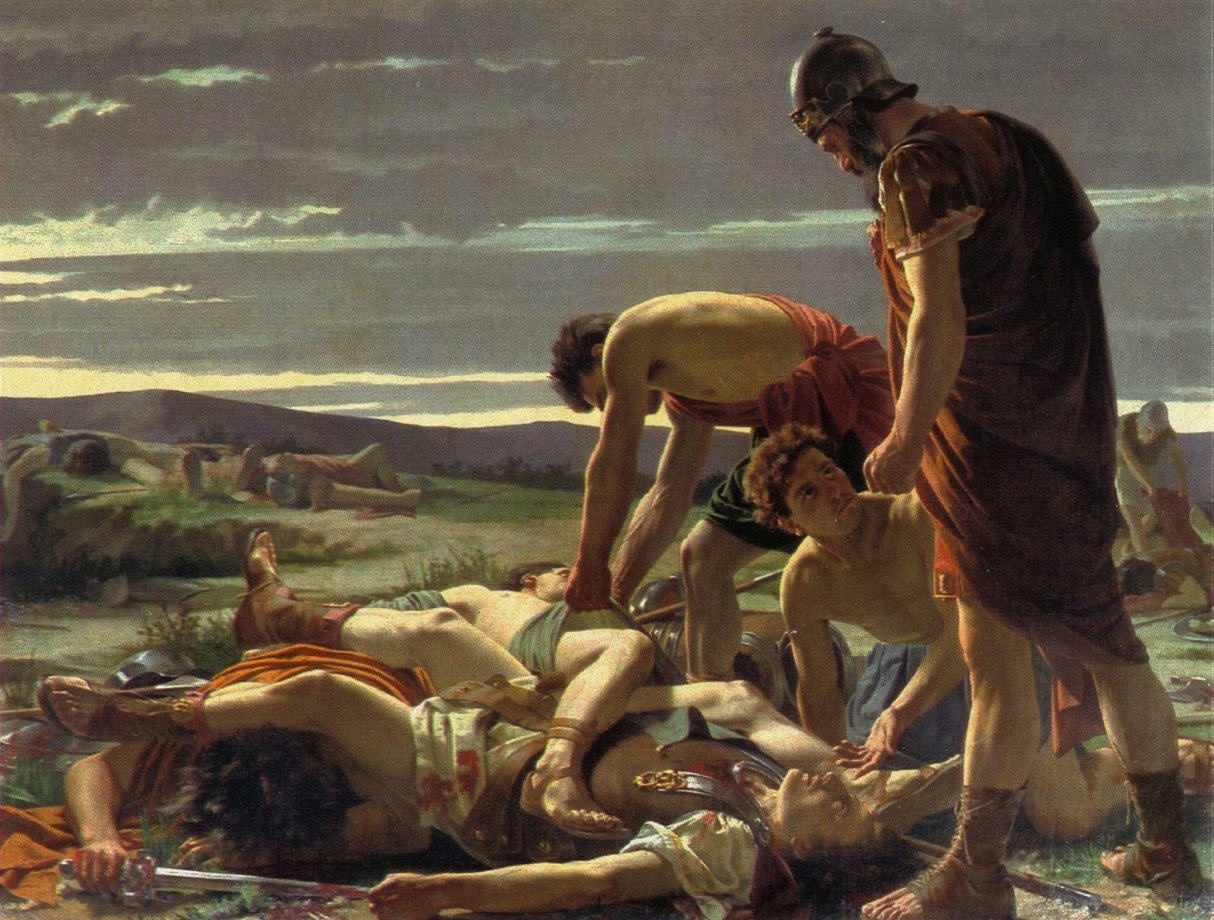
- Discovery of the body of Catiline after the Battle of Pistoria (1871) by Alcide Segoni
Date	shortly before 3 January 62 BC
Location	near Pistoria (today called Pistoia)
Result	Government victory

Belligerents
Roman Republic	Catilinarian rebels

Commanders and leaders
Marcus Petreius; Gaius Antonius Hybrida	Catiline †; Gaius Manlius †

Strength
More than Catiline	At least 3,000

The Battle of Pistoria was fought early in January 62 BC between the Roman Republic and Catiline, a member of the Senate who had been organising a conspiracy against the consuls of the previous year.

After his conspiracy was uncovered in early November 63 BC and he was denounced by then-consul Cicero, Catiline withdrew from Rome and went north into Etruria to join forces with his man there, Gaius Manlius. After arriving there, Catiline took up magisterial insignia; in response, he and Manlius were declared hostes by the Senate. The Senate also assigned Gaius Antonius Hybrida – co-consul with Cicero for 63 BC – to defeat the insurrectionists. Antonius' campaign continued into the new year and he was prorogued as proconsul.

After word reached Catiline's camp of the conspiracy's collapse with the execution of its leaders in Rome, Catiline tried to escape to Transalpine Gaul but was blocked by three legions under Quintus Caecilius Metellus Celer. With escape blocked, he withdrew south from the Apennine passes and toward Antonius' encampment at Faesulae. When Antonius was reinforced by a detachment led by Publius Sestius in the last days of December, he moved out to engage Catiline's army, and came to battle probably in the first days of January.

By the time of the battle, Catiline's army had dwindled to about three thousand. The strength of Antonius' forces is unclear, but Sallust implies that his army outnumbered Catiline's. On the day of the battle, Antonius was afflicted with gout and passed command to his legate, Marcus Petreius. Catiline's forces initially held, but Petreius summoned his praetorian cohort and broke the Catilinarian centre, routing Catiline's army. Sallust reports Catiline was found dead in the midst of Antonius' forces far forward of his own men.
