= Cornificia =

Roman poet and writer of epigrams (c. 85 BCE – c. 40 BCE)

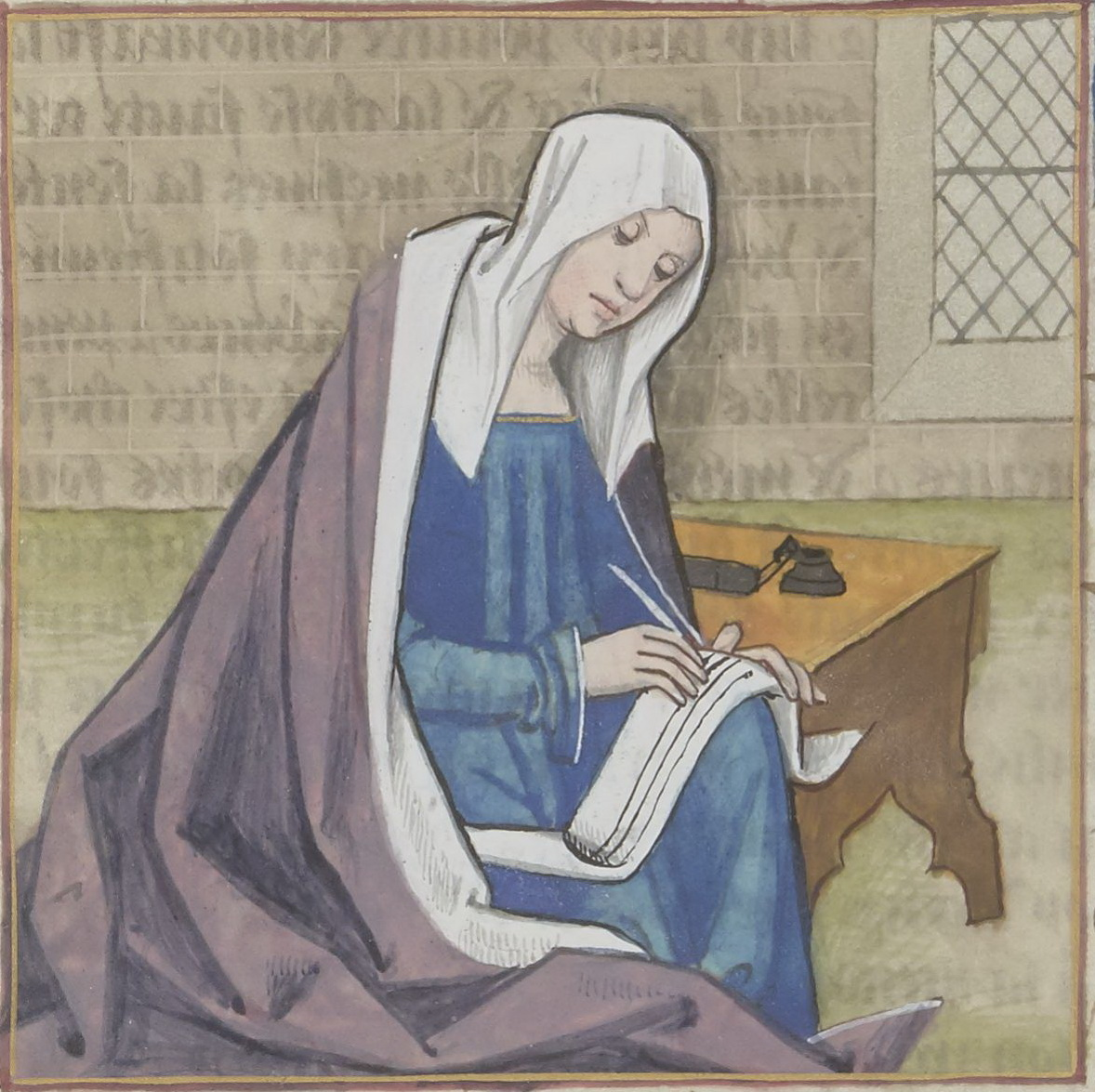
- Born: c. 85 BC
- Died: c. 40 BC
- Occupation: Poet
- Spouse: Camerius
- Children: unknown
- Parent: Quintus Cornificius (father)

Cornificia (c. 85 BC – c. 40 BC) was a Roman poet and writer of epigrams of the 1st century BC.

== Life ==
Cornificia belongs to the last generation of the Roman Republic.

The daughter of Quintus Cornificius and the sister of the poet, praetor and augur Cornificius, Cornificia married a man called Camerius. Jane Stevenson has suggested that this may be the same Camerius who was a friend of the poet Catullus, mentioned in his poem 55.

The fact that Cornificia's brother became both a praetor and an augur indicates that the family was of considerable status. A praetor was a magistrate and/or military commander, while an augur was a priest whose task was to 'take the auspices', interpreting the will of the gods by studying the activities of birds.

The author Christine de Pisan references Cornificia in her book The Book of the City of Ladies (1405), stating that she had an aptitude for learning, particularly poetry and the sciences.

== Work ==
All of Cornificia's work has been lost. Her reputation as a poet is based chiefly on the 4th century Chronicle of St Jerome (347–420 AD). In writing of her brother Cornificius, Jerome says: "Huius soror Cornificia, cuius insignia extant epigrammata" (His sister was Cornificia, whose distinguished epigrams survive). This must mean that her work was still being read some four hundred years after her death.

Cornificia is one of the 106 subjects of Giovanni Boccaccio’s On Famous Women (De mulieribus claris, 1362 AD), which says of her:

She was equal in glory to her brother Cornificius, who was a much renowned poet at that time. Not satisfied with excelling in such a splendid art, inspired by the sacred Muses, she rejected the distaff and turned her hands, skilled in the use of the quill, to writing Heliconian verses... With her genius and labor she rose above her sex, and with her splendid work she acquired a perpetual fame.

The Renaissance humanist Laura Cereta wrote in a letter to Bibolo Semproni: "Add also Cornificia, the sister of the poet Cornificius, whose devotion to literature bore such a fruit that she was said to have been nurtured on the milk of the Castalian Muses and who wrote epigrams in which every phrase was graced with Heliconian flowers."

== Monument ==
A monument to Cornificia and her brother survives in Rome, the inscription reading - CORNIFICIA Q. F. CAMERI Q. CORNIFICIUS Q. F. FRATER PR. AUGUR (Cornificia, the daughter of Quintus, wife of Camerius, [and] her brother Quintus Cornificius, Praetor and Augur).
