= Gaius Antonius Hybrida =

Roman consul in 63 BC and general

Consul of the Roman Republic
- In office 63 BC – 63 BC Serving with Marcus Tullius Cicero
- Preceded by: Lucius Julius Caesar and Gaius Marcius Figulus
- Succeeded by: Decimus Junius Silanus and Lucius Licinius Murena

Governor of Macedonia of the Roman Republic
- In office 63 BC – 60 BC
- Succeeded by: Gaius Octavius

Personal details
- Children: Antonia Hybrida Major; Antonia Hybrida Minor

Military service
- Allegiance: Roman Republic
- Branch/service: Roman Army
- Rank: Legatus
- Commands: First Mithridatic War; Catilinarian Conspiracy
- Battles/wars: Battle of Histria; Battle of Pistoria (by Marcus Petreius)

Gaius Antonius Hybrida (flourished 1st century BC) was a politician of the Roman Republic. He was the second son of Marcus Antonius and brother of Marcus Antonius Creticus; his mother is unknown. He was also the uncle of the famed triumvir Mark Antony. He had two children, Antonia Hybrida Major and Antonia Hybrida Minor.

Hybrida's career began under Lucius Cornelius Sulla, whom he accompanied into Greece as either a military tribune or a legatus. Later, in 63 BC, he was elected to serve as consul (Note: The highest elected office in Rome.) of the Roman Republic alongside Marcus Tullius Cicero. The two struck a deal which effectively allowed Cicero to rule as sole consul in exchange for Hybrida receiving the governorship of Macedonia at the end of his term. The same year, Hybrida was involved in suppressing the Catilinarian conspiracy, a plot to overthrow the state led by Lucius Sergius Catilina, or "Catiline", and which culminated in the Battle of Pistoria and the death of Catiline. After his consulship, Hybrida was granted Macedonia as had been promised. Here, Hybrida abused his rule to rob the provincials and led invasions of the neighbouring lands of Moesia. His incursions brought two separate attacks from the natives who successfully forced Hybrida out of their lands without any loot.

In 60 BC, Hybrida was quietly removed from the position of governor of Macedonia and replaced by Gaius Octavius. The next year, he was prosecuted by Julius Caesar and Marcus Licinius Crassus. The outcome of this was that Hybrida was forced to pay a fine and banished to the island Cephalonia. Sometime in 47, Hybrida was recalled from his banishment by Caesar. In 45, he made himself a candidate for the position of censor (Note: The censors were responsible for reviewing the list of Senators, taking census information and maintaining public morality.) which ultimately failed. The final mention of Hybrida comes from Cicero in 44 when Mark Antony divorced himself from Hybrida's daughter Antonia Hybrida Minor.

== Family ==
Hybrida was the younger of two sons of Marcus Antonius Orator; his brother was Marcus Antonius Creticus. He had also a sister, Antonia. He was also the uncle and father-in-law of Mark Antony. Hybrida had two daughters; Antonia Hybrida Major (major meaning "elder") who married the Roman tribune Lucius Caninius Gallus and Antonia Hybrida Minor (Minor Latin for the younger) who married her paternal first cousin Mark Antony as his second wife. By his daughters, he had at least two grandchildren; Lucius Caninius Gallus by Antonia Major and Antonia by Antonia Minor.

== Early career ==
=== Mithridatic Wars ===
In 87 BC, Hybrida accompanied Lucius Cornelius Sulla on his campaign against Mithridates VI of Pontus either as a military tribune or as a legate. Two years earlier, the Mithridatic Wars had begun due to a dispute between Mithridates and Nicomedes III of Bithynia over the Roman province of Cappadocia. Mithridates invaded and conquered both Bithynia and Cappadocia before moving on to invade the Roman province of Asia, where he massacred all the Roman citizens he could find. He then sent troops to invade Greece, which in turn spurred some of the city-states to rebel against Rome. At the time Rome was embroiled in internal conflict through the Social War from 91 to 87. Sulla, accompanied by Hybrida, marched on Greece to face the Mithridatic-Greek armies under the command of Archelaus and Aristion. The First Mithridatic War continued from 86 to 83. During this campaign, Sulla drove the Mithridatic-Greek armies back towards Athens and besieged them there. After capturing Athens, Sulla marched north and defeated two large Mithridatic armies at Chaeronea and Orchomenus. He invaded Asia Minor the following year and then successfully forced a peace with Mithridates in 83. Sulla returned to Italy in 83, leaving Lucullus to command forces in Asia and Hybrida to command a small cavalry force in Achaea. In Achaia, Hybrida levied contributions on the province, an offence for which he was prosecuted by the young Julius Caesar in 76. However, he refused to appear and succeeded in escaping punishment after appealing to the plebeian tribunes.

=== Expulsion from, and return to, the Senate ===
Years later, in 70 BC, the censors Gellius and Lentulus expelled Hybrida from the Senate for the criminal offences committed by him while in Greece, for disobeying the summons of a praetor (Note: The title of Praetor was conferred onto somebody acting in one of two official capacities; judicial duties within Rome or as commander of an army outside of Rome.) and for the wasteful use of his property. Hybrida is described by the English historian Antony Kamm as "a thoroughly disreputable character" and by author William E. Dunstan as "thuggish". In spite of this notorious reputation, Hybrida regained his seat in 68 or 66 after being elected as praetor. Hybrida also probably served as a tribune sometime before his expulsion from the Senate and also served as aedile (Note: Aediles were responsible for the maintenance of markets, roads, food supply, archives and the hosting of annual games. There were two pairs of Aediles; two Plebeian aediles who were presided over by tribunes and two Curule aediles who were presided over by the consuls.) some time between 69 and 66. For the consular elections of 64, Hybrida and another candidate, Catiline, received the support of Caesar and Marcus Licinius Crassus for their bids to become consuls of Rome. Dunstan describes Catiline as an "opportunist" who had gained notoriety for murders during Sulla's proscriptions; Kamm expands on this description by including the alleged murder of his own son, violation of a Vestal Virgin and many other "unspeakable profligacies". A third candidate also existed for the consular elections, Marcus Tullius Cicero, whom Dunstan describes as being a "brilliant orator", but he came from an undistinguished family. In the end, Cicero and Hybrida were elected consuls for the year 63.

== Consulship ==
Cicero, upon becoming consul, immediately moved to strike a deal with his consular colleague Hybrida, who had supported Catiline and his party, and who might join a rebellion against the state. In exchange for what amounted to the sole consulship for Cicero, Hybrida was to receive the rich consular province of Macedonia. Hybrida himself was heavily in debt and was wasteful of his money, and the wealth of Macedonia could be used by him to restore his lost fortune.

=== Catiliniarian Conspiracy ===
Catiline was once again a candidate for the consulship for the year of 62 BC. As part of his campaign, Catiline promised reforms to reduce and cancel debts, a proposal which brought him the support of bankrupt aristocrats, debtors, and poor farmers whose agricultural ventures had failed. This proposal, however, also pitched the conservatives, moderates and members of the Senate against him. On the day of the elections, Cicero attended wearing a breastplate under his tunic in an attempt to raise the alarm in the Senate and provoke the fear that Catiline might resort to violence as consul. In the end, Lucius Licinius Murena and Decimus Junius Silanus were elected to the position of consul and Catiline's bid for the position had once again failed. In response, and having lost hope of having a successful political career, Catiline began to conspire against the Senate. Cicero employed spies to keep tabs on Catiline and began to piece together a case against Catiline to be brought to the Senate. In the midst of these developments, Hybrida first tried to remain on the fence, but was forced to action in the face of the risk of having himself charged as a co-conspirator. On 6 November 63, Cicero learned of a plot to have himself and other members of the Senate assassinated and Rome set on fire and sacked. While this was happening, Catiline and an army of his supporters, under the command of Gaius Manlius, were to march on Rome and take control of the city. In response to these allegations, Cicero called a meeting of the Senate which Catiline himself attended. At this meeting, Cicero launched an attack against Catiline denouncing him "to his face" while providing the details of the plot that he had learned of the night before. After this meeting, Catiline fled the city of Rome to join up with Manlius and an army of approximately 10,000 men at Etruria. The Senate, upon becoming aware of this, issued a senatus consultum ultimum declaring Catiline and his army as enemies of the state. Finally, Cicero arrested five men to be brought to the Senate for an immediate trial, the outcome of which was an order for their executions which was delivered and enacted by the Senate.

Towards the end of 63, Hybrida went to Etruria to assist the praetor Quintus Metellus Celer in preventing Catiline escaping through the Alps and into Gaul. Catiline, hoping that Hybrida might choose to help him, opted to engage him and his consular army rather than the forces under the praetor. Hybrida, however, had given command of the army to his legate, Marcus Petreius, having either suffered a bout of gout or pretended to have. Catiline put up his final resistance in Pistoria, Etruria, with an army of 3,000 men. Here, Petreius and his soldiers massacred the entire army, killed and beheaded Catiline, and then sent his head to Rome. Hybrida, having adhered to the agreement that he had with Cicero and the Senate, was granted the governorship of Macedonia at the end of his consulship.

== Governor of Macedonia ==
Immediately upon receiving the governorship of Macedonia, Hybrida set about robbing and plundering the provincials. An accountant in his court spread a report claiming that Hybrida's plundering had yielded as much profit for Cicero as it did for Hybrida himself; however, if he had indeed robbed the provincials on Cicero's account he never paid his dues to Cicero. Hybrida then began to move on to the barbarian lands around Macedonia with the same intent to pillage as he had in Macedonia. It was during these incursions that Hybrida suffered two successive defeats: the first came at the hands of the Dardanians after he had encroached upon their land in Lower Moesia, and the second at the Battle of Histria in Upper Moesia. The ancient Roman historian Cassius Dio narrates the events thus:

The latter, while governor of Macedonia, had inflicted many injuries upon the subject territory as well as upon that which was in alliance with Rome, and had suffered many disasters in return. For after ravaging the possessions of the Dardanians and their neighbours, he did not dare to await their attack, but pretending to retire with his cavalry for some other purpose, took to flight; in this way the enemy surrounded his infantry and forcibly drove them out of the country, even taking away their plunder from them. When he tried the same tactics on the allies in Moesia, he was defeated near the city of the Istrians by the Bastarnian Scythians who came to their aid; and thereupon he ran away.

— Cassius Dio's Roman History, Book XXXVIII, 10

In both of these instances, a failed retreat by Hybrida and his cavalry led to his unit being absolutely defeated and any plunder accrued during the attack was forfeited back to the natives. This lack of success, rather than the extortion of the provincials, drew the attention of the Senate who threatened to recall and prosecute Hybrida for his mismanagement of the province. In 60 BC, Hybrida was quietly replaced by Gaius Octavius as the Governor of Macedonia and in March of 59, during the consulship of Caesar and Marcus Culpurnius Bibulus, was prosecuted for the mishandling of the governorship by Caesar and Crassus. In the end, Hybrida was tried by Marcus Caelius Rufus for his participation in the Catilinarian conspiracy and by Lucius Caninius Gallus for his crimes in Macedonia. He was defended by Cicero, not out of duty but as a protest against the current state of affairs in Rome. Despite this, Hybrida was found guilty of his crimes, ordered to pay a fine, and banished from Rome to a place of his choosing. Hybrida settled upon Cephallenia as his residence for the duration of his exile.

== Exile and later career ==
During his exile at Cephellenia, Hybrida pretended to act as governor of the island which the people secretly allowed. In 49 BC, his nephew, Mark Antony, was elected to the role of tribune of the people and a legate of Caesar's in Italy. Despite this, Hybrida remained in exile until 47 when he returned to Rome at Caesar's request. One possible explanation for this is that Mark Antony was indebted to Hybrida; as Hybrida was in exile and had no civil rights, he could not enforce a payment and this suited Mark Antony. Hybrida was a candidate for censorship around 45; his character and support from Mark Antony, however, doomed his candidacy. The final mention of Hybrida during his life comes from Cicero who commented upon Mark Antony's divorce from Antonia Hybrida Minor and the insult this conferred upon Hybrida himself.

== Citations ==
Political offices
Preceded by Lucius Julius Caesar; Gaius Marcius Figulus	Roman consul 63 BC with Marcus Tullius Cicero	Succeeded by D. Junius Silanus; L. Licinius Murena
