= Lucius Calpurnius Bestia (tribune 62 BC) =

1st century BC Roman politician

Lucius Calpurnius Bestia was a Roman politician, and one of the Catilinarian conspirators. (Note: This Bestia is probably not the Lucius Calpurnius Bestia, a candidate for the praetorship in 57. In 56 he was twice accused of using bribery during his candidature; he was acquitted in the first trial and possibly convicted in the second. In 43 he attached himself to the party of Antony, apparently in the hope of obtaining the consulship.)

== Biography ==
He was possibly a grandson of the Lucius Calpurnius Bestia who was consul in 111 BC. He was tribune elect in 63 BC, and it had been arranged that, after entering upon his office, he should publicly accuse Cicero of responsibility for the impending war. This was to be the signal for the outbreak of revolution. The conspiracy, however, was put down and Bestia had to content himself with delivering a violent attack upon the consul on the expiration of his office.

== Cultural depictions ==
In modern literature, he is used as a secondary character in two of the SPQR series of mysteries by John Maddox Roberts; The Catiline Conspiracy and Saturnalia.

== Sources ==
- Alexander, Michael Charles (1990). Trials in the late Roman republic, 149 BC to 50 BC. Toronto: University of Toronto Press. ISBN 0-8020-5787-X. OCLC 41156621.
