= Catilinarian conspiracy =

Attempted coup in the Roman republic in 63 BC

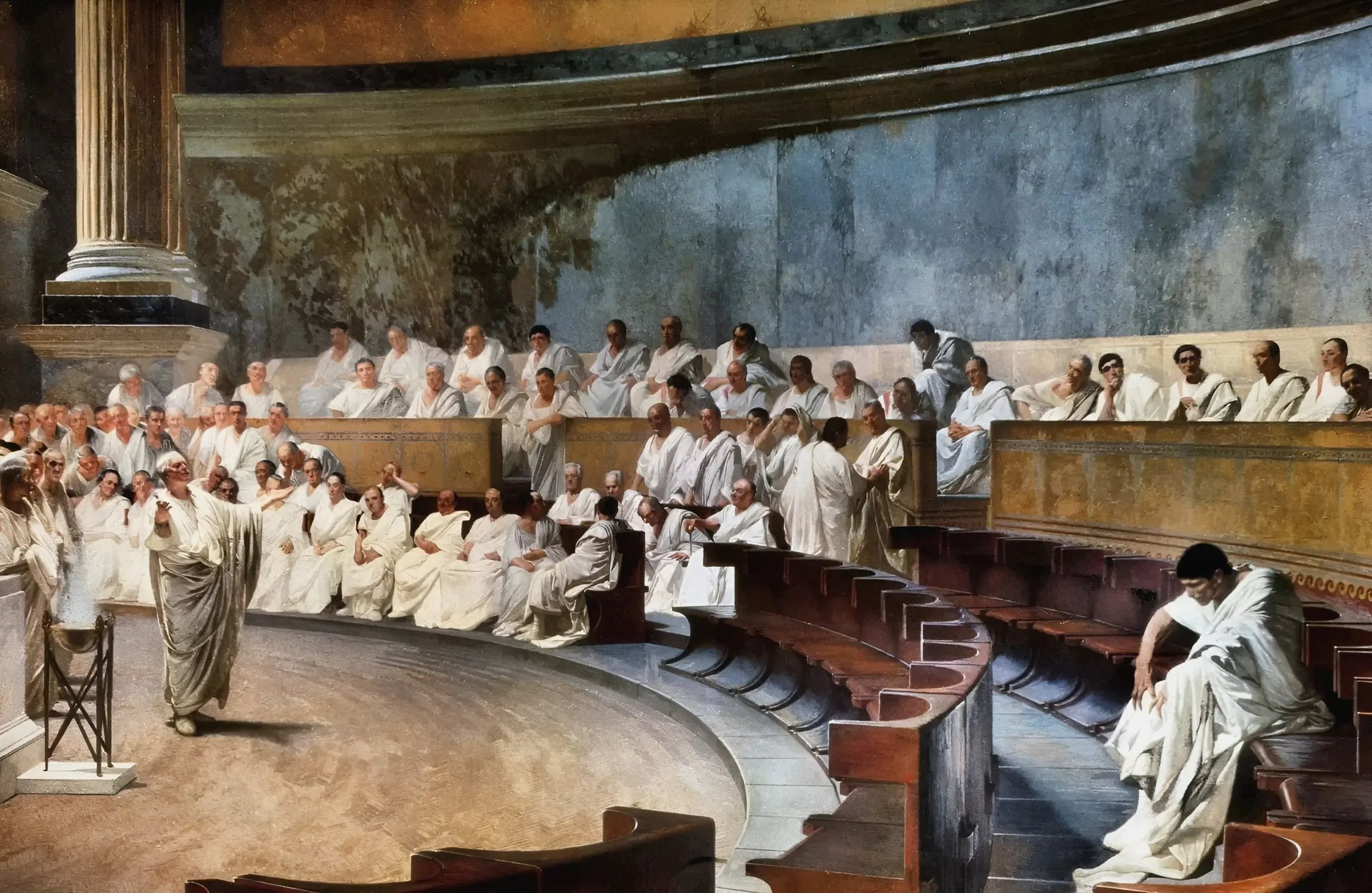
1889 depiction by Cesare Maccari of Cicero denouncing Catiline in the senate. Mary Beard notes that this idealised depiction is "a seductive fantasy of the occasion and the setting". There was no major age gap: both men were in their forties.

The Catilinarian conspiracy, sometimes called the second Catilinarian conspiracy, was an attempted coup d'état by Lucius Sergius Catilina (Catiline) to overthrow the Roman consuls of 63 BC – Marcus Tullius Cicero and Gaius Antonius Hybrida – and forcibly assume control of the state in their stead.

The conspiracy was formed after Catiline's defeat in the consular elections for 62, held in early autumn 63. He assembled a coalition of malcontents – aristocrats who had been denied political advancement by the voters, dispossessed farmers, and indebted veterans of Sulla – and planned to seize the consulship from Cicero and Antonius by force. In November 63, Cicero exposed the conspiracy, causing Catiline to flee from Rome and eventually to his army in Etruria. In December, Cicero uncovered nine more conspirators organising for Catiline in the city; on advice of the senate, he had them executed without trial. In early January 62 BC, Antonius defeated Catiline in battle, putting an end to the plot.

Modern views on the conspiracy vary. It is well accepted that the ancient sources were heavily biased against Catiline and demonised him in the aftermath of his defeat. The extent of the exaggeration is unclear and still debated. Most classicists agree that the conspiracy occurred more or less as described – rather than being a manipulative invention of Cicero's – but concede that its actual threat to the republic was exaggerated for Cicero's benefit and to heighten later dramatic narratives.

== History ==
Catiline's conspiracy was a major armed insurrection against Rome, like Sulla's civil war that preceded it (83–81 BC) and Caesar's civil war (49–45 BC) that followed it. The main sources on it are both hostile: Sallust's monograph Bellum Catilinae and Cicero's Catilinarian orations. Catiline, before the conspiracy, had been complicit in the Sullan regime. While no member of his family had held the consulship since the fifth century BC, he had strong connections to the aristocracy and was both a nobilis and a patrician.

Catiline was prosecuted in 65 and 64 BC for various crimes but was acquitted after several former consuls spoke in his defence. His influence even during his prosecutions was considerable. For example, Cicero had considered a joint candidacy with him in 65 BC. While some of the ancient sources say Catiline was involved in a First Catilinarian conspiracy to overthrow the consuls of that year, modern scholars believe this first conspiracy is fictitious.

=== Causes and formation ===
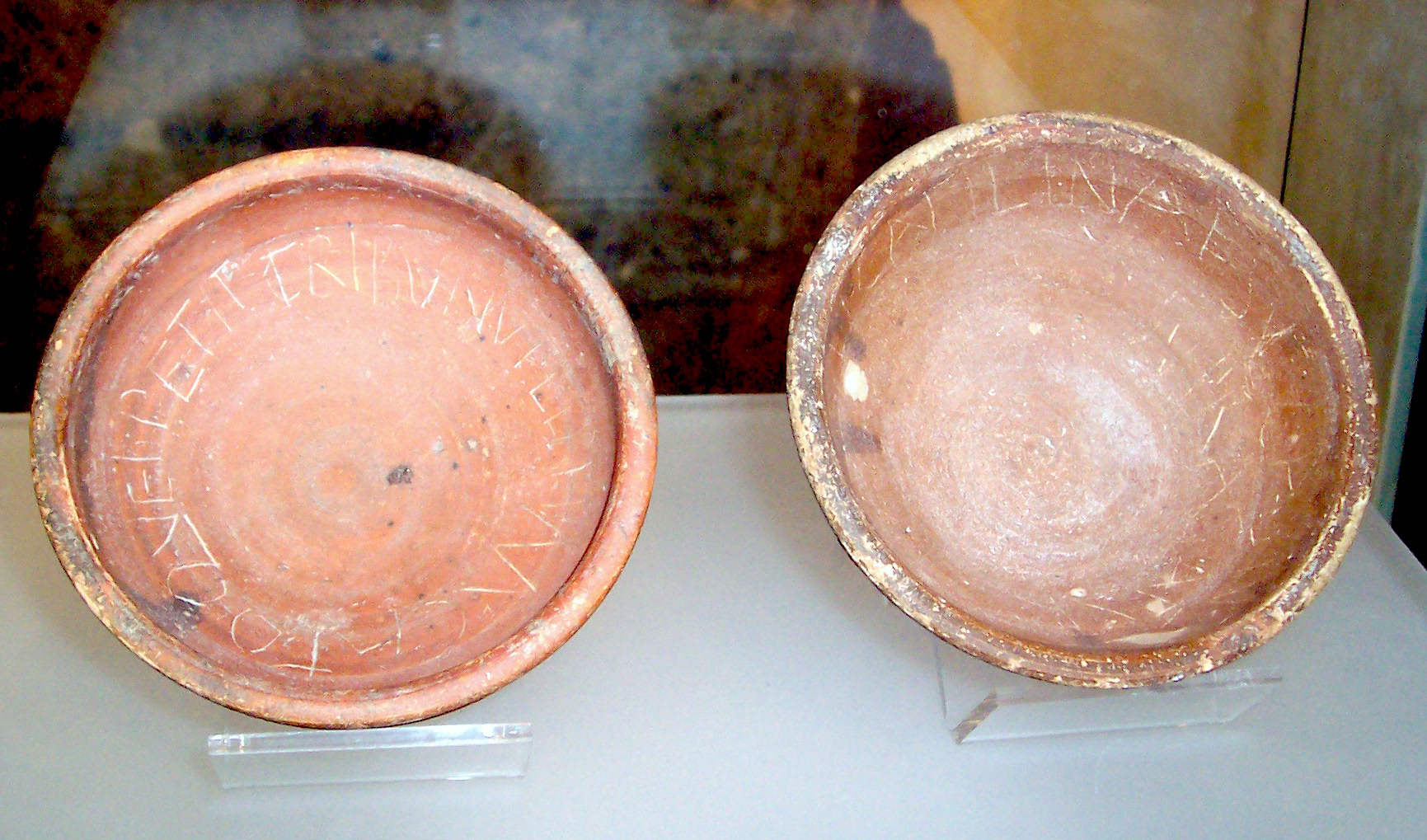
Bowls containing food distributed in electoral canvasses. The bowl to the right was commissioned by Lucius Cassius Longinus and distributed in support of Catiline's consular candidacy in 63 BC. The bowl on the left was distributed by Marcus Porcius Cato in a coeval campaign for the plebeian tribunate.

Catiline had stood for the consulship three times by 63 BC and was rejected every time by the voters. Only after his defeat at the consular comitia in 63 – for consular terms starting in 62 BC – did Catiline start planning a coup to seize by force the consulship which had been denied to him. He enlisted into his circle a number of disreputable senators: Publius Cornelius Lentulus Sura, a former consul ejected from the senate for immorality in 70 BC; Gaius Cornelius Cethegus, a Sertorian sympathiser with few prospects for promotion; Publius Autronius Paetus, a winning consular candidate in the elections of 66 BC who had his victory annulled and senate seat stripped after conviction on bribery charges; and two other senators expelled for immorality and corruption. Other malcontents who had expected but had been denied advancement joined the conspiracy, such as Lucius Cassius Longinus, who had been praetor in 66 and defeated in consular elections in 63 BC, Lucius Calpurnius Bestia, and two Sullae.

Non-senatorial men filled the ranks. The classicist Erich Gruen describes these men as "mixed", adding that "single-minded purpose cannot readily be ascribed" to them. Some were frustrated candidates for municipal elections, some may have been motivated by debts, some sought profit in the chaos, and others were members of declining aristocratic families like Catiline. What allowed them to raise a meaningful threat to the state was their mobilisation of men displaced by Sulla's civil war. Joining those dispossessed in the Sullan proscriptions were landed Sullan veterans who expected monetary rewards and had fallen into debt after poor harvests.

The ancient sources generally credit their involvement in the conspiracy with large debts that Catiline's putsch supposedly would have erased. But scholars reject this as a sole cause and consider the shame of unmet political ambitions indispensable. None of the ancient sources, except Dio, mention any connection between Catiline and land reform. It is likely Dio is wrong; if Catiline had advocated for land reform, Cicero would likely have alluded to it. Three of the conspirators had been repulsed at the consular elections. Another three had been ejected from the senate. Others found themselves unable to attain the same offices as their ancestors.

The conspiracy was for the benefit of Roman citizens only, not slaves. Although Cicero and others stoked fears of another servile rebellion – the last servile rebellion had been suppressed in 71 BC – the evidence leans against their involvement. Catiline planned not a social revolution, but a coup to place himself and his allies in charge of the republic. The defeat of the Rullan land reform bill early in 63 BC also must have stoked resentment: the bill would have confirmed Sullan settlers on their land, and allowed them to sell it to the state. It would have distributed new lands to poor dispossessed citizens. The failure of the relief bill at Rome contributed to the uprising's support among the poor. This was coupled with a general financial and economic crisis stretching back at least to the First Mithridatic War, a quarter-century earlier. With renewed demand for capital in the aftermath of stability secured by Pompey's victory in the Third Mithridatic War, moneylenders would have called in debts and increased interest rates, driving men into bankruptcy.

=== Discovery ===
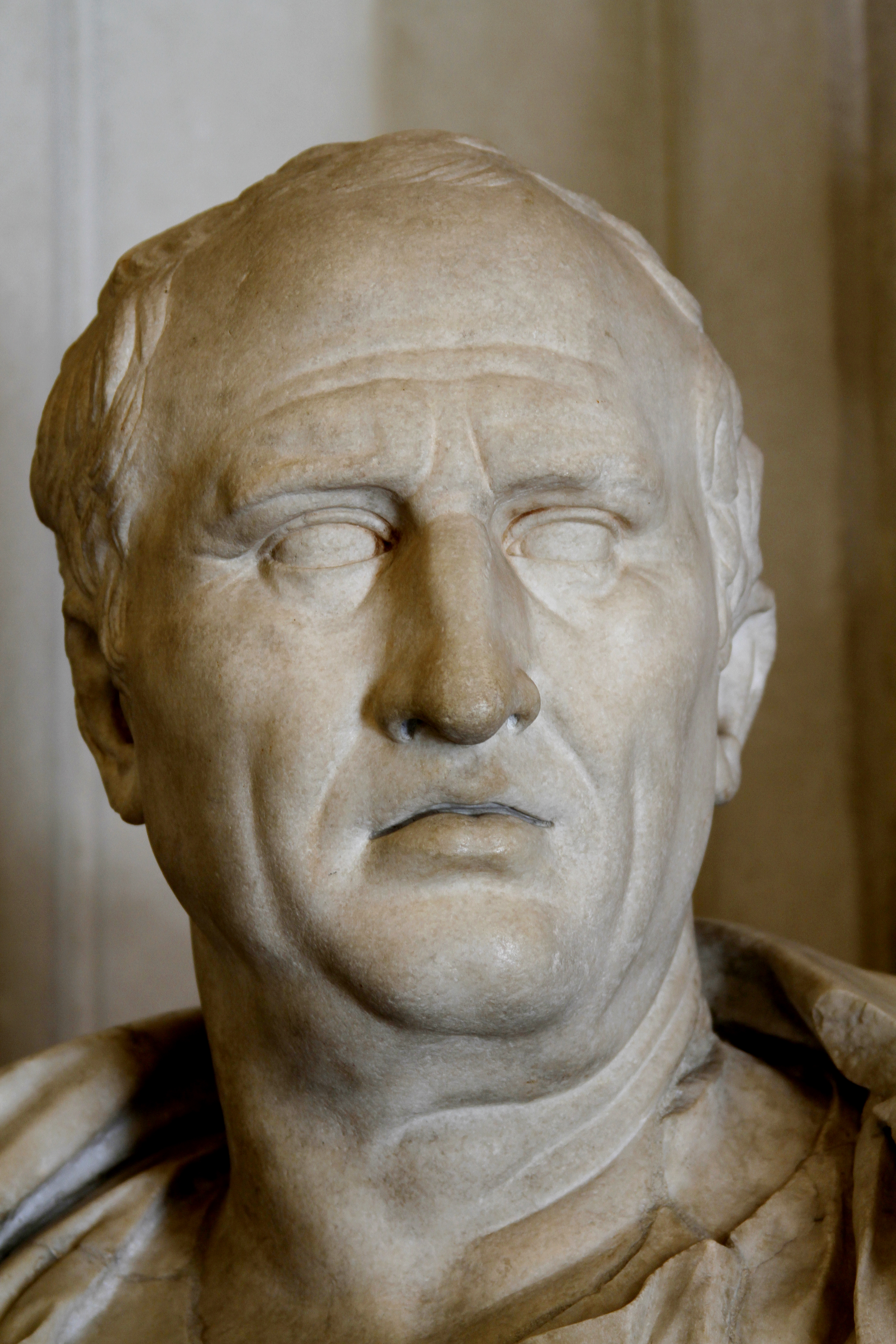
A 1st century AD depiction of Cicero, one of the consuls in 63 BC and one of the leaders of the response against Catiline, today in the Capitoline Museum.

The consul Cicero heard rumours of a plot from a woman named Fulvia in the autumn in 63 BC. The first concrete evidence was provided by Marcus Licinius Crassus, who handed over letters on 18 or 19 October which described plans to massacre prominent citizens. Crassus' letters were corroborated by reports of armed men gathering in support of the conspiracy. In response, the senate passed a decree declaring a tumultus (a state of emergency) and, after receipt of the reports of armed men gathering in Etruria, carried the senatus consultum ultimum instructing the consuls to do whatever it took to respond to the crisis.

By 27 October, the senate had received reports that Gaius Manlius, a former centurion and leader of an army there, had taken up arms near Faesulae. Some modern scholars have argued that Manlius' revolt was initially independent of Catiline's plans; however, Berry 2020, p. 32, rejects this. In response, Cicero dispatched two nearby proconsuls and two praetors to respond to the possibility of armed insurrection with permission to levy troops and orders to maintain night watches.

Catiline remained in the city. While named in the anonymous letters sent to Crassus, this was insufficient evidence for incrimination. But after messages from Etruria connected him directly to the uprising, he was indicted under the lex Plautia de vi (public violence) in early November. The conspirators met, probably on 6 November, and found two volunteers to make an attempt on Cicero's life. Cicero alleged that the conspirators plotted to engulf Rome in flames and destroy the city. Sallust reports this allegation allowed Cicero to turn the urban plebs against Catiline, but modern scholars do not believe that Catiline credibly wanted to destroy the city.

After the attempts on Cicero's life failed on 7 November 63 BC, he assembled the senate and delivered his first oration against Catiline, publicly denouncing the conspiracy. Catiline attempted to speak in his defence – attacking Cicero's ancestry – but was shouted down and promptly left the city to join Manlius' men in Etruria. Writing a letter, likely preserved in Sallust, he committed his wife to the protection of a friend and left the city, justifying his actions in terms of honours unjustly denied to him and denying any alleged indebtedness.

=== Manoeuvres ===
When Catiline arrived in Manlius' camp, he assumed consular regalia. The senate responded immediately by declaring both Catiline and Manlius hostes (public enemies). Cassius Dio's history adds that Catiline was promptly convicted on the pending charges of vis (public violence). The senate dispatched Cicero's co-consul, Gaius Antonius Hybrida, to lead troops against Catiline and put Cicero in charge of defending the city.

==== Execution of the conspirators ====
At this time, Cicero discovered a plot led by Publius Cornelius Lentulus Sura, one of the sitting praetors, to bring in the Allobroges, a Gallic tribe, to support the Catilinarians but the Allobroges revealed Lentulus' plans. Cicero, using the Allobroges' envoys as double agents, sought their cooperation in identifying as many members of the conspiracy in the city as possible. With evidence provided by their help, on 2 or 3 December, five men were arrested: Lentulus, Cethegus, Statilius, Gabinius, and Caeparius. After the Gallic envoys divulged all they knew with promises of immunity before the senate, the prisoners confessed their guilt; Lentulus was forced to resign his magistracy and the others were committed to house arrest.

An informer on 4 December attempted to incriminate Crassus in the Catilinarian plot but the informer was not believed and imprisoned. The same day, an attempt was also made to free the prisoners; the senate responded by scheduling a debate on their fate – along with the fates of four other conspirators who had escaped – for the following day. The debate on the fate of the prisoners occurred in the Temple of Concord. Cicero, as consul, had been empowered by the previously passed senatus consultum ultimum to take whatever steps he thought necessary to safeguard the state, but such decrees, while lending moral support for consular action, did not grant any kind of formal immunity. Cicero's goal in requesting senatorial advice was probably to transfer responsibility for any executions to the senate as a whole. When later charged with killing citizens without trial, he justified his actions in terms of following the senate's non-binding advice.

Calling the senate in order of seniority, (Note: In Cicero's day, speaking order started with the princeps senatus, then the consuls-elect, followed by the ex-consuls in an order set by the presiding consuls at the start of the year. Each grade of magistrates then followed: ex-praetors, praetors, and so descending.) the consuls-elect and ex-consuls all spoke in favour of the death penalty. But when Julius Caesar, who then was praetor-elect, was called, he proposed either life imprisonment or custody pending trial. Caesar's lenient position won many senators over to his side, although it too was illegal – life sentences not being permitted without trial – and impractical. Cicero purports he then interrupted proceedings to deliver a speech urging immediate action, (Note: The interrupting speech was the Fourth Catilinarian. Berry 2020, p. 191 believes the speech as preserved to be fictitious: the speech is too long and contains anachronistic allusions to events.) but the tide did not turn towards execution until Cato the Younger spoke.

Plutarch's summary indicates that Cato gave a passionate and forceful speech inveighing against Caesar personally and implying that Caesar was in league with the conspirators. Sallust's version has Cato rail against moral decline in the state and has him criticising the senators for failing to be strict and harsh like their ancestors. With the appeal that swift execution would cause defections among the Catilinarians and exaggerated claims that Catiline was to be upon them imminently, Cato's speech carried the day. With the senate ratifying Cicero's proposal to execute the conspirators without trial, Cicero had the sentences carried out, proclaiming at their conclusion, vixerunt (lit. 'they have lived'). He was then hailed by his fellow senators as pater patriae ("father of the fatherland").

==== Final defeat ====
After the five prisoners were killed, support fell away from Catiline and his army. Some in Rome, such as the then-tribune Metellus Nepos, proposed transferring command from Antonius to Pompey, calling upon Pompey to save the state. Early the next year, near Pistoria, Catiline's remaining men, numbering at least three thousand, met Antonius's forces in the battle of Pistoria. The now-proconsul claimed illness; with Marcus Petreius in actual command, the Catilinarian army was defeated, ending the crisis. Catiline was himself killed in the battle. Antonius was hailed as imperator for the victory.

=== Conclusion ===
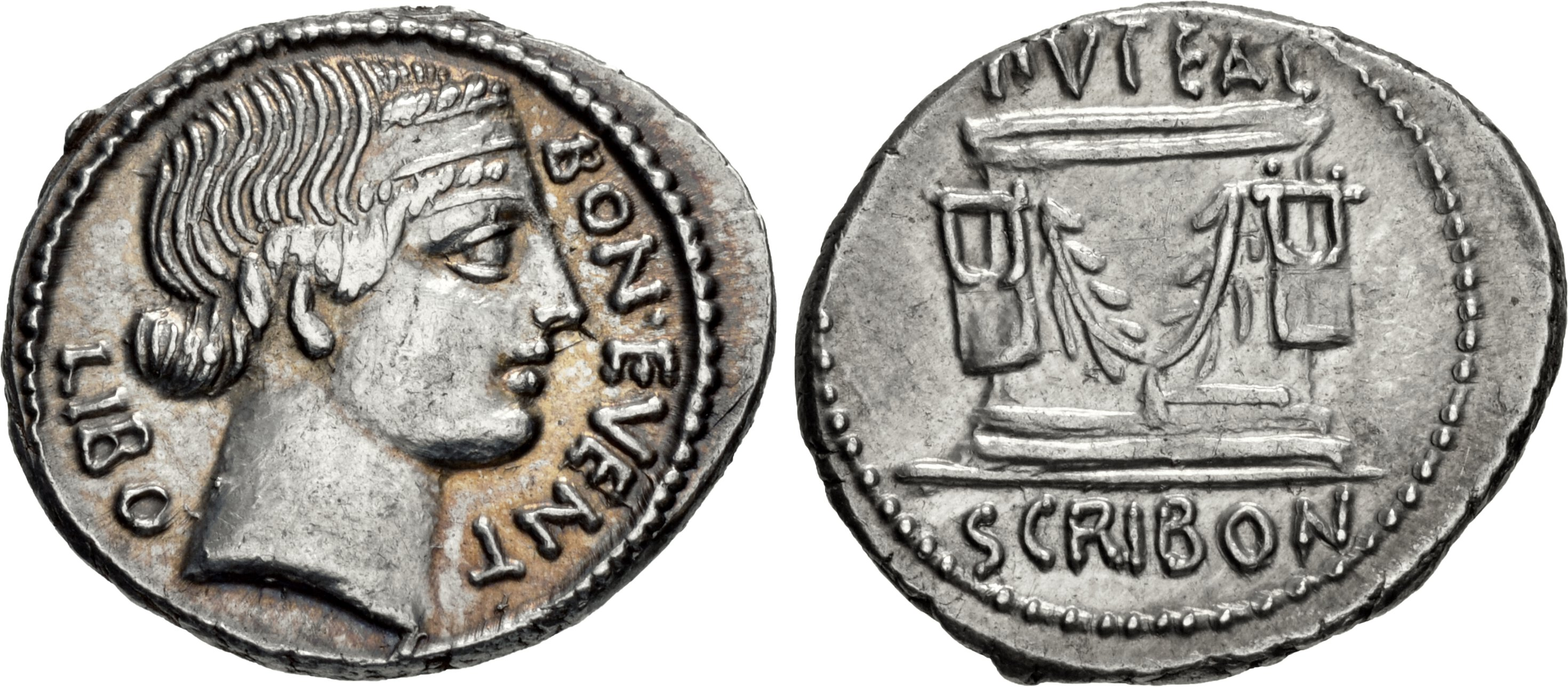
A denarius minted by Lucius Scribonius Libo in 62 BC. The portrayal of Bonus Eventus on the obverse likely commemorates the repression of Catiline's conspiracy.

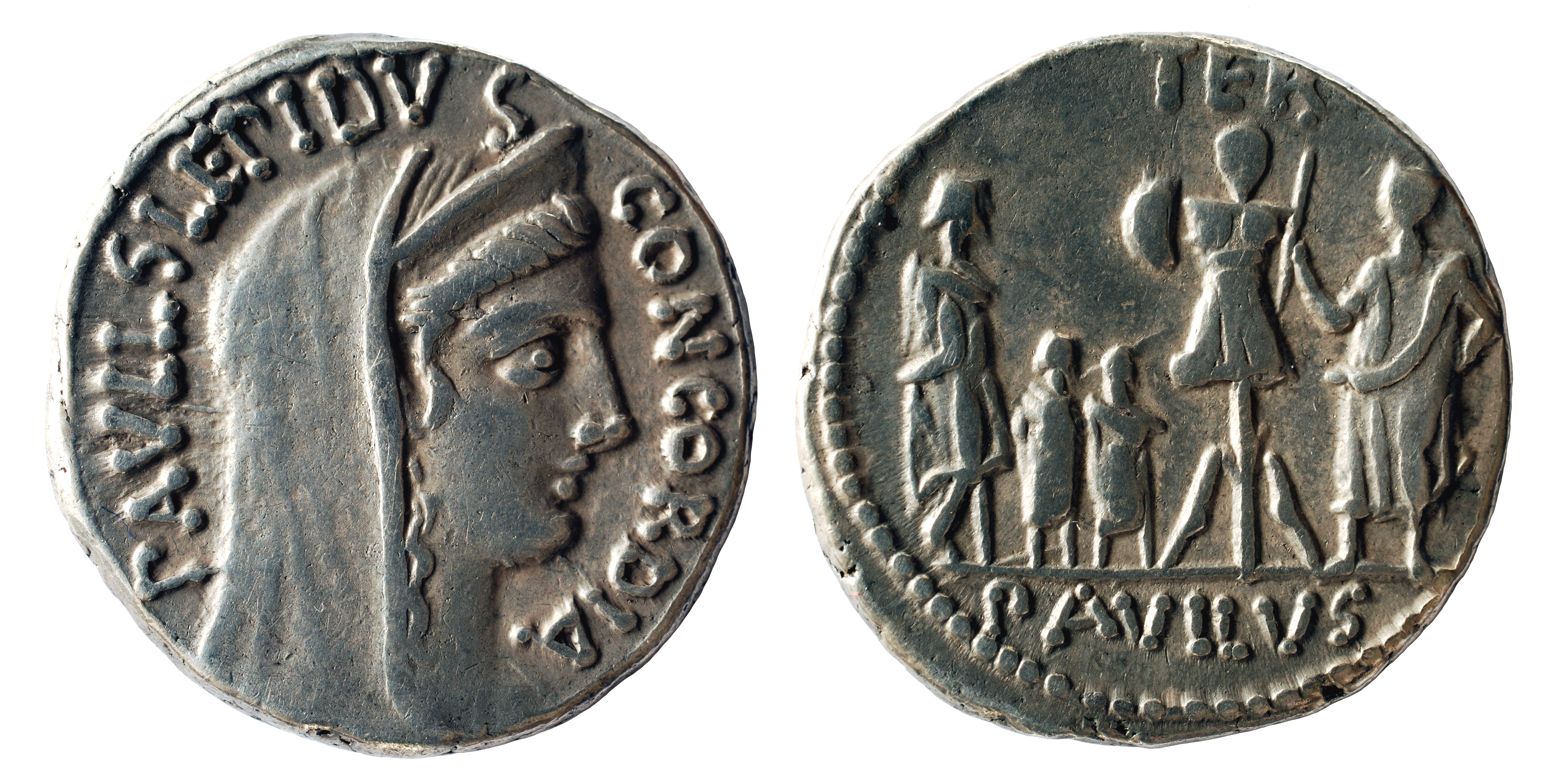
A denarius minted by Lucius Aemilius Paullus in 62 BC commemorating Catiline's defeat. It depicts the goddess Concordia, on the left. Berry 2020, p. 54 argues that Paullus attempted to connect Catiline's defeat to peace.

While Cicero was initially hailed for his role in saving the state, he did not accrue all the credit, to his dismay. Cato was also hailed as having roused the senate to act against the conspirators. There were some turns against Cicero's actions in the immediate aftermath of the summary executions. At the close of the consular year, Cicero's valedictory speech was vetoed by two tribunes of the plebs. One of the tribunes, Quintus Caecilius Metellus Nepos, sought to bring Cicero up on charges for executing citizens without trial. The senate prevented him from doing so, by threatening to declare anyone who brought a prosecution a public enemy.

In the coming years, Cicero's enemies reorganised. Publius Clodius Pulcher, tribune in 58 BC, enacted a law banishing anyone who had executed a citizen without trial. Cicero promptly fled the city for Greece. His exile was eventually lifted and he was recalled to Rome the next year at Pompey's behest. Views on Cicero's success in defending the republic are mixed: while Cicero argued that he had saved the commonwealth and many scholars have accepted his defence of necessary exigency, Harriet Flower, a classicist, writes he did so "by circumventing due process and the civil rights of citizens" while also revealing "the consul's complete lack of confidence in the court system on which the New Republic of Sulla was supposed to be based".

== Historiography ==
=== Bias in ancient accounts ===
The main sources on the conspiracy are Sallust's Bellum Catilinae, a monograph on the conspiracy, and Cicero's Catilinarian orations. As a whole, the sources – in ancient times – almost always took anti-Catilinarian perspectives. The negative view of Catiline in the sources found its way into Roman imperial culture. Cicero's narrative is one-sided and it is well established that he exaggerated the danger of Catiline's threat in his orations for political advantage. He also recounted his side of the story – also an act of self-promotion – in a memoir and a three-book poem De consulatu suo. Cicero's narrative casts Catiline in terms of immorality while eliding the economic hardships of the time. The narratives also extend beyond attacks on Catiline but also into exaggerating and justifying Cicero's role and actions during the conspiracy. The orations were published, c. 60 BC, to defend Cicero from political backlash for his executions without trial.

Sallust, who was active politically before and after the conspiracy, was not present in Rome in 63 BC, likely abroad on military service. His history lies somewhat parallel to Cicero's Catilinarians, relying on extra-Ciceronean evidence, especially contemporary oral sources, but Cicero's orations and a now-lost memoir are core sources for Sallust's monograph. Sallust's overarching focus on moral decline as a cause of the republic's collapse has him paint an ahistorical portrait of Catiline that elides details in favour of his larger narrative. J. T. Ramsey, in a commentary on the monograph, writes:

S. [Sallust] fails to allow for a gradual shift in Catiline's strategy and aims as his hopes of reaching the consulship faded, because S. prefers to present Catiline as a through-going villain, the product of the corrupt age, who was bent on the destruction of the state from the very beginning...

More problematically, Sallust's reliance on Cicero's one-sided narrative leads him to accept Cicero's invective uncritically, exacerbating the portrait's hostility.

=== Overemphasis ===
Both ancient and modern accounts have focused on the ways that Cicero turned the affair to his political advantage. The Pseudo-Sallustian Invective against Cicero, for example, alleges Cicero cynically transformed civil strife for his own political benefit. Many scholars also dismiss the conspiracy and its clean-up as being a minor affair that did not present a serious threat to the republic. For example, Louis E. Lord in the introduction to the 1937 Loeb Classical Library translation of Cicero's Catilinarian orations calls it "one of the best known and least significant episodes in Roman history". Scholars have also criticised over-estimation of the importance of Catiline's insurrection, but others stress that the affair was not meaningless and that it jolted the republic into action. Erich Gruen, in Last Generation of the Roman Republic, writes:

It is evident, in retrospect, that the event did not shake the foundations of the state. The government was in no real danger of toppling; the conspiracy, in fact, strengthened awareness of a common interest in order and stability. It is not, however, to be dismissed as a minor and meaningless episode. Motives of the leader may have been personal and less than admirable. But the movement itself called to notice a number of authentic social ills which had previously lacked effective expression...

The shape of the social structure remained basically unaffected... but the grievances had been brought to public attention... prominent leaders recognised the utility of responding to needs exposed in the Catilinarian affair. The grain bill sponsored by Cato in 62 obviously belongs in this context... Two major bills in 59 and another in 55 went a long way toward relief.

=== Underlying causes ===
Some older historiography viewed the conspiracy in terms of a party-political conflict between the optimates and populares. This view is criticised as uncritically accepting confusing and empty ancient political slogans while ignoring Catiline's Sullan bona fides. While sources sometimes put popularis speeches into the mouths of Catiline and others, the dyadic nature of the Roman constitution forced justification of anti-senatorial policies by appeal to popular sovereignty. Neither popular or senatorial advocates questioned the legitimacy of the other. Scholars also dispute whether Catiline had a following among the urban plebs at all and question whether later Ciceronean speeches connecting Clodius with Catiline are merely political invective. Some older scholarship conceived of Catiline as being a puppet of Julius Caesar or Marcus Crassus; this position "has long been discredited". While scholars accept that Catiline may have received some support from Crassus and Caesar, at least during his campaigns for the consulships of 63 and 62 BC, their support did not extend to the conspiracy.

=== Critical perspectives ===
The most critical historians have alleged that the entire conspiracy was invented or incited by Cicero for his own advantage. Reevaluations and defences of Catiline started with Edward Spencer Beesly's 1878 book Catiline, Clodius, and Tiberius, though this initial defence was poorly received and lacked evidence. The most often-cited modern defences are Waters 1970 and Seager 1973. In 1970, Kenneth Waters argued that the descriptions of the conspiracy were motivated mostly by Cicero's need to present himself as having achieved something during his consulship. After detailing Catiline's purported plan, Waters argues that the description given of it is prima facie unbelievable and that, if true, the conspirators would have been implausibly incompetent. He argues that Catiline was forced to depart Rome under a cloud of false allegations to Etruria, where he made common cause with a pre-existing group of rebels to fight against Cicero's political dominance. Waters dismisses the Gallic evidence as setups by the consul meant to provide the senate with evidence of a plot, and views the execution in Rome of the conspirators and Sallust's reports that no prisoners were taken at Pistoria as Cicero cutting loose ends.

Robin Seager argued in 1973 that Catiline's involvement in a plot against the state postdates Cicero's First Catilinarian and that when he left Rome in November, he had not yet fully committed to any rebellion. He also argues that Manlius, whom Cicero cast as Catiline's military attaché, acted independently of Catiline for separate reasons. Only in Etruria, on Catiline's way to Massilia, he joined with Manlius after concluding that rebellion would protect his dignitas more than exile. Seager also rejects a joint plan between Catiline and Lentulus, arguing Lentulus probably joined late in the conspiracy to capitalise on the disruption, and pictures Cicero as attempting to purge Italy from unreliable elements in advance of Pompey's return to prevent him from taking over the state like Sulla. Most scholars reject Waters' and Seager's reconstructions and accept the broader historicity of Catiline's plot in 63 BC.
