= List of elections before 1701 =

The following elections occurred before 1701.

== 1st century BCE ==
- 64 BCE Roman consular election
- 63 BCE Roman consular election
- 60 BCE Roman consular election

== 600s ==
- Election of Uthman

== 900s ==
- 911 German royal election
- 983 German-Italian royal election

== 1000s ==
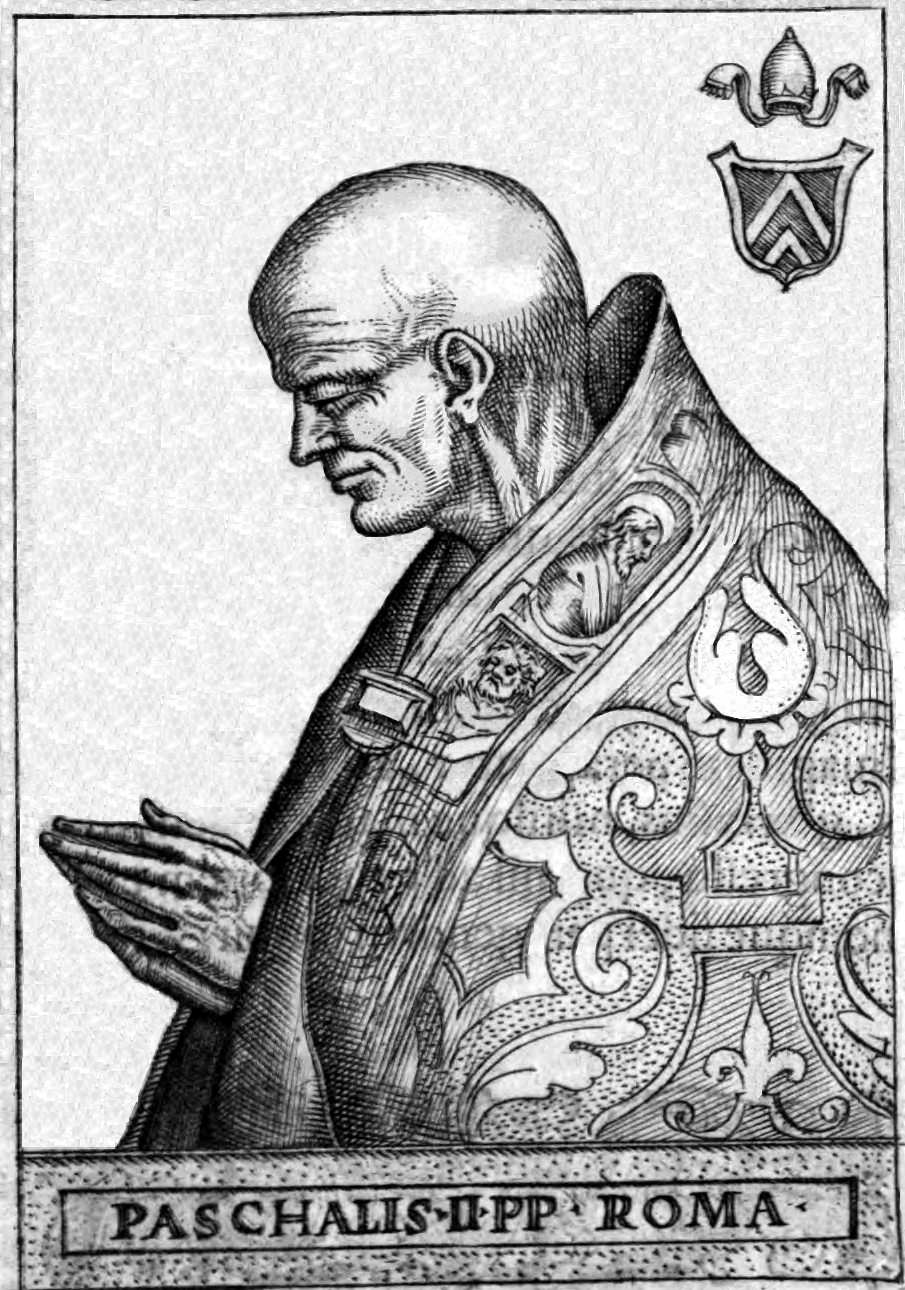
Pope Paschal II, elected in 1099

- 1002 German royal election
- 1024 German royal election
- 1028 Imperial election
- 1051 Imperial election
- 1061 papal election
- 1073 papal election
- 1075 Imperial election
- 1077 Imperial election
- 1081 Imperial election
- 1086 papal election
- 1088 papal election
- 1098 Imperial election
- 1099 papal election

== 1100s ==
- 1118 papal election
- 1119 papal election
- 1124 papal election
- 1125 German royal election
- 1127 Imperial election
- 1130 papal election
- 1138 Imperial election
- 1143 papal election
- 1144 papal election
- 1145 papal election
- 1147 Imperial election
- 1152 Imperial election
- 1153 papal election
- 1154 papal election
- 1159 papal election
- 1169 Imperial election
- 1181 papal election
- 1185 papal election
- October 1187 papal election
- December 1187 papal election
- 1191 papal election
- 1196 Imperial election
- 1198 papal election
- March 1198 Imperial election
- June 1198 Imperial election

== 1200s ==
- 1216 papal election
- 1227 papal election
- 1229 Venetian doge election
- 1241 papal election
- 1243 papal election
- 1254 papal election
- 1261 papal election
- 1264–1265 papal election
- Simon de Montfort's Parliament, January 1265
- 1268–1271 papal election
- January 1276 conclave
- July 1276 conclave
- September 1276 papal election
- 1277 papal election
- 1280–1281 papal election
- 1285 papal election
- 1287–1288 papal election
- 1292–1294 papal election
- 1294 conclave

== 1300s ==
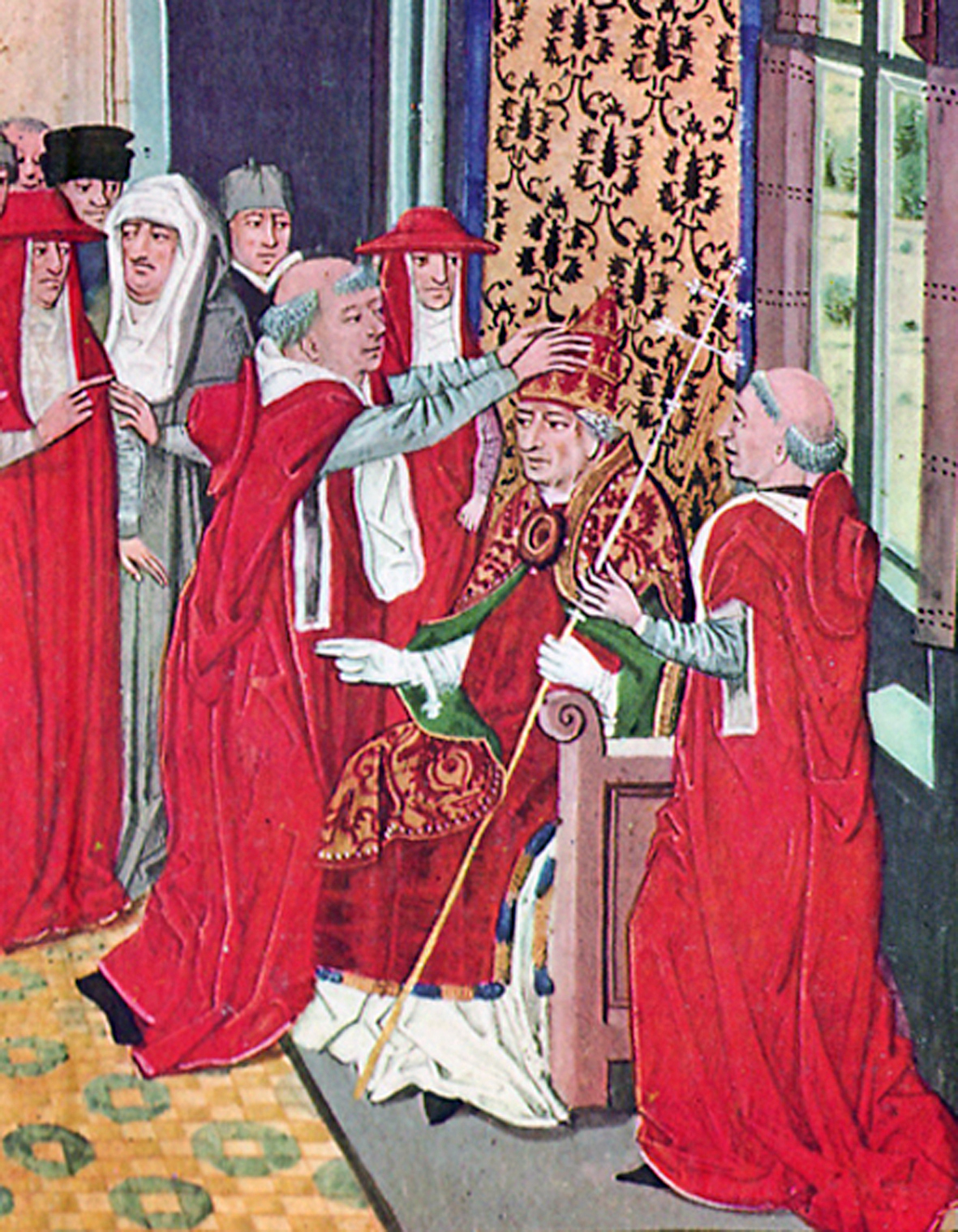
Gregory XI, the last pope of the period of Avignon Papacy, was elected in 1370

- 1303 conclave
- 1304-1305 conclave
- 1314–1316 conclave
- 1334 conclave
- 1342 conclave
- 1352 conclave
- 1362 conclave
- 1370 conclave
- 1378 conclave
- 1389 conclave

== 1400s ==
- 1404 conclave
- 1406 conclave
- (1409) Council of Pisa
- (1414–1418) Council of Constance
- 1423 Venetian doge election
- 1431 conclave
- 1447 conclave
- (1431–1449) Council of Florence
- 1455 conclave
- 1458 conclave
- 1462 Venetian doge election
- 1464 conclave
- 1471 conclave
- 1473 Venetian doge election
- 1484 conclave
- 1492 conclave

== 1500s ==
- September 1503 conclave
- October 1503 conclave
- 1513 conclave
- 1521–1522 conclave
- 1523 conclave
- (1534) Election of Christian III
- 1534 conclave
- 1549–1550 conclave
- April 1555 conclave
- May 1555 conclave
- 1559 conclave
- 1565–1566 conclave
- 1571 Haverfordwest election
- 1572 conclave
- 1585 conclave
- September 1590 conclave
- October–December 1590 conclave
- 1591 conclave
- 1592 conclave

== 1600s ==
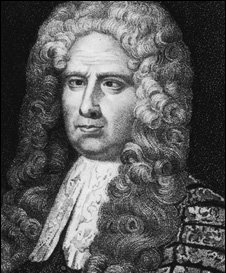
John Trevor, Speaker of the English House of Commons from 1685 to 1687 (the Loyal Parliament)

- March–April 1605 conclave
- May 1605 conclave
- 1621 conclave
- 1623 conclave
- 1644 conclave
- 1655 conclave
- 1661 English general election
- 1667 conclave
- 1669–1670 conclave
- 1676 conclave
- March 1679 English general election
- October 1679 English general election
- 1681 English general election
- 1685 English general election
- 1689 English general election
- 1689 conclave
- 1691 conclave
- 1690 English general election
- 1695 English general election
- 1698 English general election

== 1700 ==
- 1700 conclave
