= List of royal and imperial elections in the Holy Roman Empire =

The following is a list of imperial elections in the Holy Roman Empire. Entries in italics are for elections where the claim of the man elected to be King of the Romans was disputed.

Election	Location	Man elected	Relationship	Dynasty	Notes	Electorate held
911	Forchheim	Conrad I	Different dynasty	Conradines	First elected king	
919	Fritzlar	Henry	Different dynasty	Ottonian/Liudolfing	Arnulf might have been an anti-king	
936	Aachen	Otto	Son of predecessor	Ottonian		
961	Worms	Otto II	Son of predecessor	Ottonian	Co-king of his father until 961	
983	Verona	Otto III	Son of predecessor	Ottonian		
1002	Mainz	Henry II	2nd cousin of predecessor	Ottonian		
1024	Kamba, near Oppenheim	Conrad II	Different dynasty	Salian		
1028	Aachen	Henry III	Son of predecessor	Salian		
1051	Trebur	Henry IV	Son of predecessor	Salian		
1075	Goslar	Conrad II	Son of predecessor	Salian	King of the Romans	
1077	Forchheim	Rudolf of Rheinfelden	Different dynasty	Rheinfelden	Anti-king	
1081	Ochsenfurt	Hermann of Salm	Different dynasty	Salm	Anti-king	
1106	Mainz	Henry V	Different dynasty (son of Henry IV)	Salian		
1125	Mainz	Lothair III	Different dynasty	Supplinburg		
1127	Nuremberg	Conrad III	Different dynasty	Hohenstaufen	Anti-king of the Romans	
1138	Koblenz	Conrad III	Same man	Hohenstaufen	King of the Romans	
1147	Regensburg	Henry (VI)	Son of predecessor	Hohenstaufen	King of the Romans	
1152	Frankfurt	Frederick I	Nephew of predecessor	Hohenstaufen		
1169	Bamberg	Henry VI	Son of predecessor	Hohenstaufen		
1196	Frankfurt	Frederick II	Son of predecessor	Hohenstaufen	Father was still alive	
March 1198	Mühlhausen	Philip	Uncle of predecessor	Hohenstaufen	King of the Romans	
June 1198	Cologne	Otto IV	Different dynasty	Welf		
1208	Frankfurt	Otto IV	Different dynasty	Welf		
1211	Nuremberg	Frederick II	different dynasty	Hohenstaufen	Anti-king until 1215	
1220	Frankfurt	Henry (VII)	son of predecessor	Hohenstaufen	King of the Romans	
1237	Vienna	Conrad IV	Half-brother of predecessor	Hohenstaufen	King of the Romans	
1246		Henry Raspe	Different dynasty	Ludovingians	Anti-king of the Romans	
1247		William II of Holland	Different dynasty	Holland (Gerulfings)	Anti-king of the Romans	
1252	Brunswick	William II of Holland	Different dynasty	Holland (Gerulfings)	Anti-king of the Romans until 1254, sole king thereafter	
January 1257	Frankfurt	Richard	Different dynasty	Plantagenet	King of the Romans	None
April 1257		Alfonso X	Maternal grandson of Philip of Swabia	Ivrea/Burgundy	Contender	None
1273	Frankfurt	Rudolf I	Different dynasty	Habsburg	King of the Romans	None
1292		Conrad II of Teck	Different dynasty	Zähringen	Contender	None
1292	Frankfurt	Adolf	Different dynasty	Nassau	King of the Romans	None
1298		Albert I	Different dynasty	Habsburg	King of the Romans	None
1308	Frankfurt	Henry VII	Different dynasty	Luxembourg		None
19 October 1314	Sachsenhausen	Frederick (III)	Different dynasty	Habsburg	King of the Romans agreement in 1325	None
20 October 1314	Frankfurt	Louis IV	Different dynasty	Wittelsbach	agreement in 1325	None
1346	Rhens	Charles IV	Different dynasty	Luxembourg		Son of the Elector of Bohemia
1348	Lahnstein	Edward III	Different dynasty	Plantagenet	Anti-king	None
January 1349	Frankfurt	Günther	Different dynasty	Schwarzburg	Anti-king	None
June 1349	Frankfurt	Charles IV	Different dynasty	Luxembourg		Bohemia
1376	Frankfurt	Wenceslaus IV	Son of predecessor	Luxembourg	King of the Romans	Brandenburg (and son of the elector of Bohemia)
May 1400	Frankfurt	Frederick I	Different dynasty	Welf	Unclear if he was ever elected	None
August 1400	Rhens	Rupert	Different dynasty	Wittelsbach	King of the Romans	Palatinate
September 1410		Sigismund	Different dynasty	Luxembourg		None (brother of the Elector of Bohemia) (Note: His cousin Jobst of Moravia claimed to be Elector of Brandenburg but Sigismund's Dienstmann Frederick voted instead.)
October 1410		Jobst of Moravia	First cousin of predecessor	Luxembourg	King of the Romans	Brandenburg (and first cousin of the Elector of Bohemia)
1411		Sigismund	First cousin of predecessor	Luxembourg		Brandenburg (and half-brother of the Elector of Bohemia)
1438	Frankfurt	Albert II	Son-in-law of predecessor	Habsburg	King of the Romans	Bohemia (did not attend)
1440	Frankfurt	Frederick III	Second cousin of predecessor	Habsburg		None
1486	Frankfurt	Maximilian I	Son of predecessor	Habsburg		None
1519	Frankfurt	Charles V	Grandson of predecessor	Habsburg		None (brother-in-law of the Elector of Bohemia)
1531	Cologne	Ferdinand I	Brother of predecessor	Habsburg		Bohemia
1562	Frankfurt	Maximilian II	Son of predecessor	Habsburg		Son of the Elector of Bohemia
1575	Regensburg	Rudolf II	Son of predecessor	Habsburg		Son of the Elector of Bohemia
1612	Frankfurt	Matthias	Brother of predecessor	Habsburg		Bohemia
1619	Frankfurt	Ferdinand II	First cousin of predecessor	Habsburg		None (had been deposed as Elector of Bohemia)
1636	Regensburg	Ferdinand III	Son of predecessor	Habsburg		Bohemia
1653	Augsburg	Ferdinand IV	Son of predecessor	Habsburg	King of the Romans	Bohemia (abstained)
1658	Frankfurt	Leopold I	Brother of predecessor	Habsburg		Bohemia (abstained)
1690	Augsburg	Joseph I	Son of predecessor	Habsburg		Son of the Elector of Bohemia (who abstained)
1711	Frankfurt	Charles VI	Brother of predecessor	Habsburg		Bohemia
1742	Frankfurt	Charles VII	Different dynasty	Wittelsbach		Bavaria and Bohemia (brother of the Elector of Cologne and cousin of the Elector of Palatinate)
1745	Frankfurt	Francis I	Different dynasty (son-in-law of Charles VI)	Lorraine		Husband of the Electress of Bohemia
1764	Frankfurt	Joseph II	Son of predecessor	Habsburg-Lorraine		Son of the Electress of Bohemia
1790	Frankfurt	Leopold II	Brother of predecessor	Habsburg-Lorraine		Bohemia (brother of the Elector of Cologne)
1792	Frankfurt	Francis II	Son of predecessor	Habsburg-Lorraine		Bohemia (nephew of the Elector of Cologne)
