= 63 BCE Roman consular election =

Election of Roman consuls for 62 BCE

- 63 BCE (Note: The month is not recorded and has been disputed.)

193 centuries of the Centuriate Assembly 97 centuries needed to win

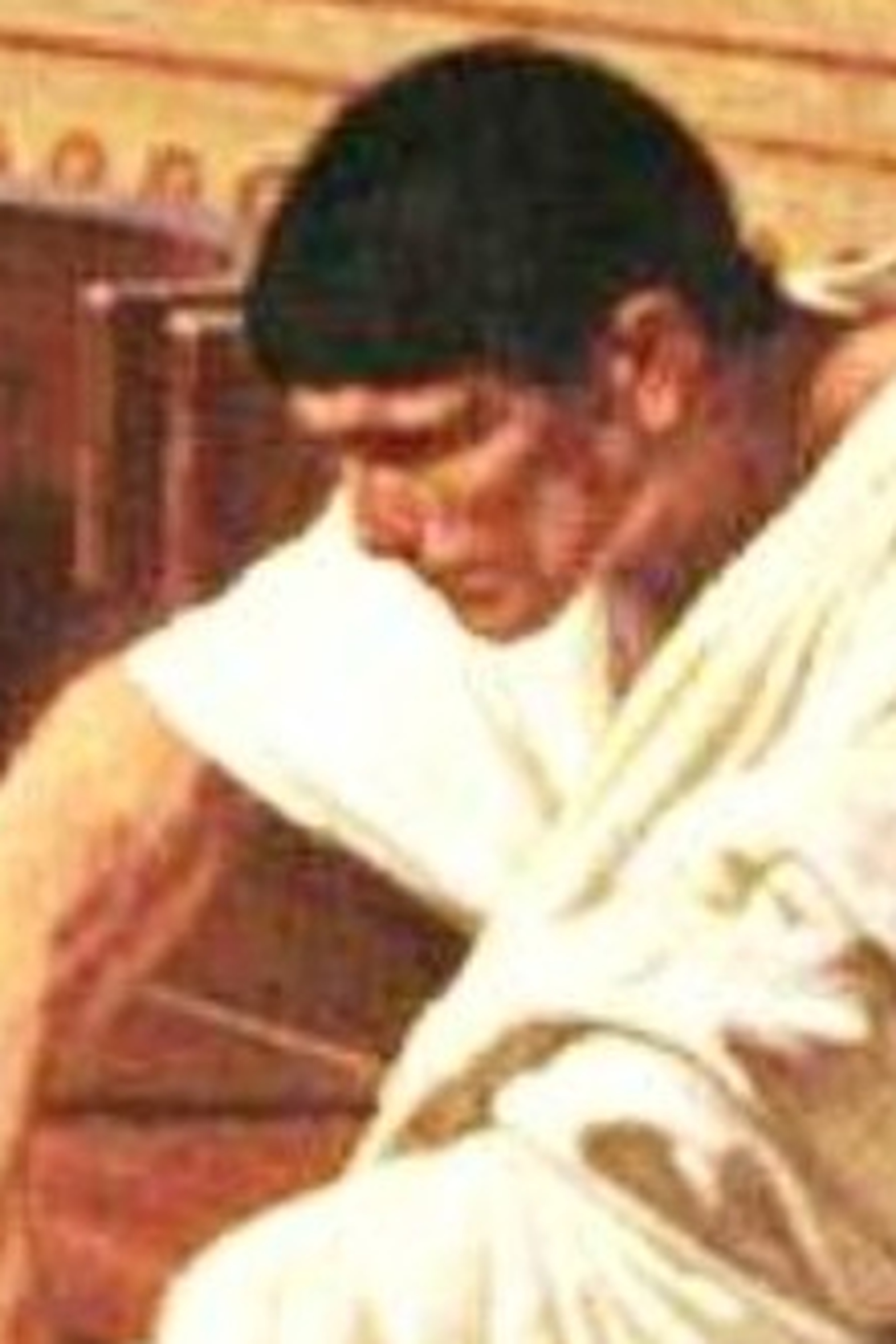
Candidate	Decimus Junius Silanus	Lucius Licinius Murena
Result	Elected	Elected
Candidate	Servius Sulpicius Rufus	Lucius Sergius Catilina
Result	Defeated	Defeated
Consuls before election
Marcus Tullius Cicero and
Gaius Antonius
Elected consuls
Decimus Junius Silanus and
Lucius Licinius Murena

The 63 BCE Roman consular election was held to elect the two consuls of the Roman Republic for 62 BCE. Decimus Junius Silanus and Lucius Licinius Murena were elected, defeating Servius Sulpicius Rufus and Lucius Sergius Catilina (Catiline).

Only one consul each year could be a patrician, so Catiline and Sulpicius were in effect competing for a single place. Cicero, one of the consuls of 63 BCE, supported Sulpicius, which harmed Catiline's chances. Bribery was widespread, and the consuls carried a law against it shortly before the vote. Sulpicius afterwards prosecuted Murena for bribery, but Cicero defended him and Murena was acquitted. The defeat was Catiline's second in succession; he afterwards led the Catilinarian conspiracy, an armed attempt to take control of the state.

== Background ==
Antonius, Catiline's ally in the elections of 64 BCE, had joined with Cicero in a deal where he would take the wealthy and exploitable province of Macedonia, which Cicero had been given, in exchange for cooperation; he had therefore broken with Catiline early in 63 BCE. At that point there were no indications that Catiline was involved in a conspiracy, and he was still nursing hopes of an eventual consulship that would be both his birth-right and necessary for his career.

The year was an unsettled one in Rome. A proposal came before the plebs to redistribute lands, which would have alleviated great hardship at a time of economic distress. Cicero spoke out against it, warning of tyrannical land commissioners and painting the project as selling out the people to the beneficiaries of the Sullan proscriptions. This was coupled with a general financial and economic crisis stretching back at least to the First Mithridatic War, a quarter-century earlier.

== Electoral system ==
The consuls were elected by the comitia centuriata, which was made up of 193 voting units called centuries, apportioned to Roman citizens by wealth and age and hugely overweighting the old and wealthy. Citizens voted in person for their candidate, and each unit registered one vote for each open post; because two consulships were open, a century would vote for two candidates. Once a candidate received a majority of 97 centuries he won and was removed from the contest.

In the early Republic the consulship had been monopolised by the patricians, but over the centuries laws had been put in place to limit their dominance. By the late Republic, only one of the consuls each year could be a patrician; one or two of those elected had to be plebeian.

== Candidates ==
There were four major candidates, of whom two were patricians.

Major candidates for the consulship of 62 BCE
Candidate	Background	Result
Decimus Junius Silanus	Plebeian; aedile in 70 BCE	Elected
Lucius Licinius Murena	Plebeian; urban praetor in 65 BCE	Elected
Servius Sulpicius Rufus	Patrician; jurist	Defeated
Lucius Sergius Catilina	Patrician nobilis	Defeated

Silanus was the stepfather of Marcus Junius Brutus, having married Brutus' mother Servilia, which made him the brother-in-law of Cato the Younger. He had held the aedileship in 70 BCE. (Note: Smith's Dictionary of Greek and Roman Biography and Mythology adds that Silanus stood unsuccessfully for the consulship of 63 BCE; Asconius' list of the seven candidates at the election of 64 BCE does not include him.)

Murena was an officer (legate) in the Third Mithridatic War, and as urban praetor made himself popular by the magnificence of the games he provided. He was then governor (propraetor) of Gallia Transalpina in 64 BCE and part of 63 BCE, returning to Rome from Gaul before the end of his term to stand for the consulship and leaving his brother Gaius in charge of the province as his deputy.

Sulpicius was chiefly distinguished as a jurist, and would attain the consulship in 51 BCE.

Catiline was a member of an ancient patrician family, the gens Sergia. His candidacy had been rejected by the presiding magistrate in 66 BCE, and he had been defeated at the elections of 64 BCE.

== Campaign ==
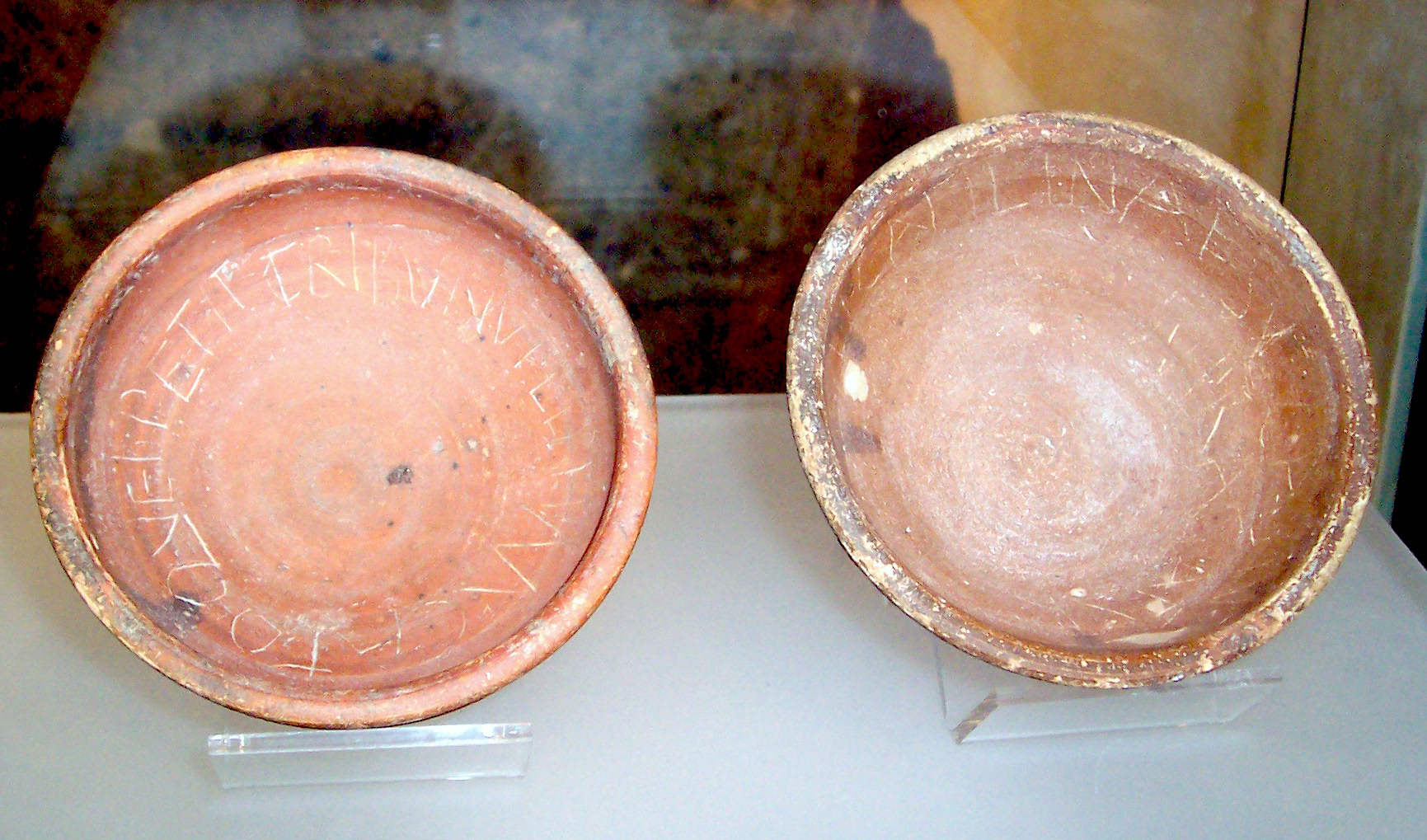
Bowls containing food distributed in electoral canvasses. The bowl to the right was commissioned by Lucius Cassius Longinus in support of Catiline's candidacy; the bowl on the left was distributed by Marcus Porcius Cato in a concurrent campaign for the plebeian tribunate. Giving food to voters was common as a means to build up goodwill.

Cicero supported Sulpicius' bid as a friend and fellow lawyer, which directly harmed Catiline's chances, since the two patricians could not both be elected. Just before the elections, Cicero alleges, Catiline engaged in demagoguery and attempted to build up his standing with the poor and dispossessed men of Rome and Italy, including himself among their number and advocating the wholesale abolition of all existing debts (tabulae novae). Sallust reports that Catiline promised his supporters that he would kill the rich, but this is likely ahistorical. Nor does any contemporary source indicate that Catiline supported land reform.

Bribery was rampant, and after the Senate moved to pass legislation against electoral corruption, Cicero and Antonius as consuls carried the lex Tullia shortly before the election, increasing penalties and enumerating forbidden electoral practices. The penalty under it was ten years' exile, and it forbade candidates to give shows in the two years before their candidacy, or to hire persons to attend them.

== Election ==
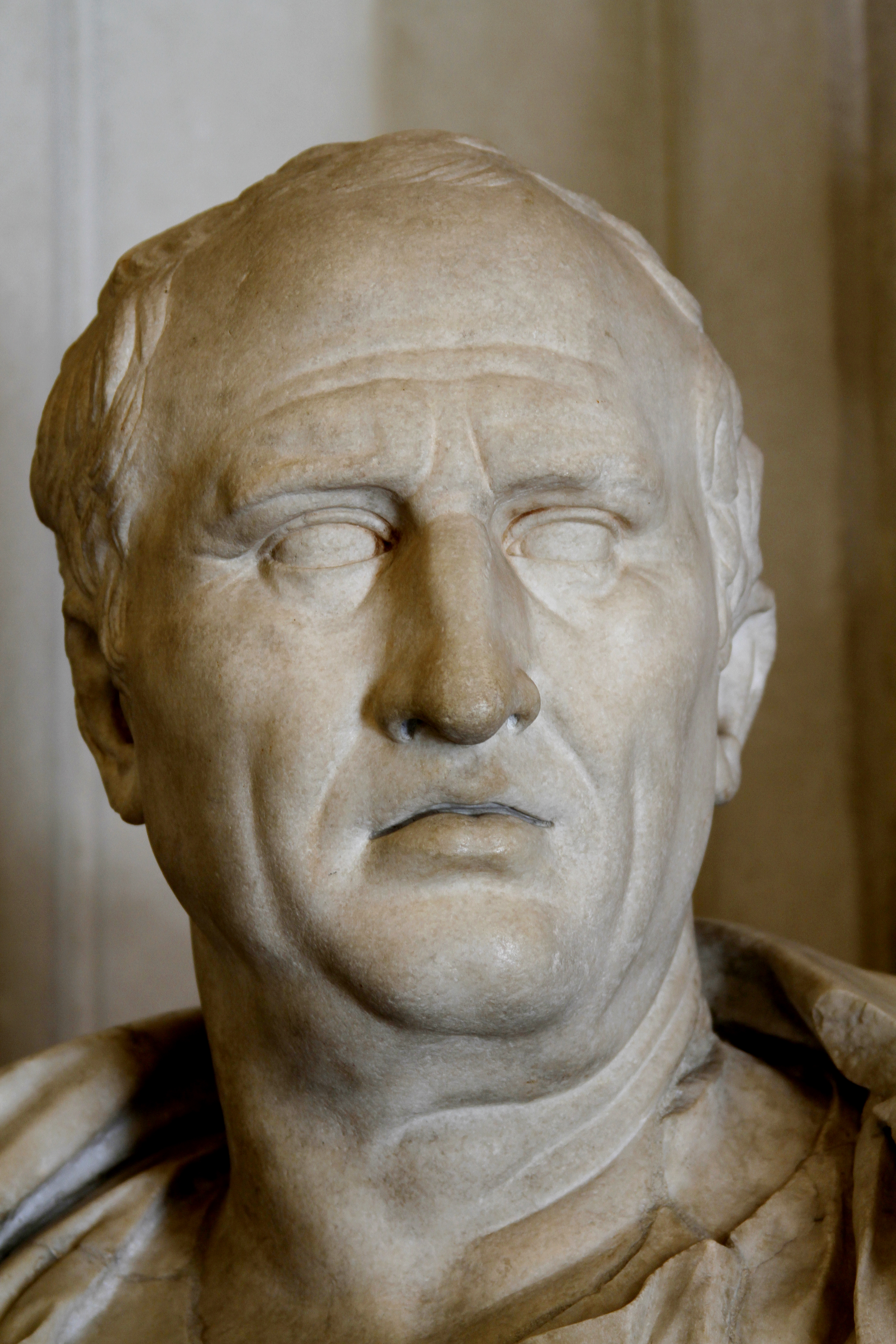
A 1st-century CE depiction of Cicero, consul in 63 BCE, who presided at the comitia

The election was held in 63 BCE, on a date that is not recorded and that has been disputed. It did not take place on the day originally appointed: shortly beforehand Cicero brought Catiline's conduct before the Senate, which on his motion decreed a postponement so that the matter could be debated.

Cicero presided over the comitia surrounded by a bodyguard and wearing an ostentatious cuirass, to signal his belief that Catiline posed a threat to his person and public safety. By his own account the display had its intended effect, and electors who saw the consul in apparent danger rallied to Murena; he also attributed Murena's success to the return of his soldiers to vote, who remembered his generosity from the campaigns they had served together.

Silanus and Murena won the two consulships; Catiline and Sulpicius were defeated. For Catiline it was a second successive defeat, and his third failure to reach the consulship.

== Aftermath ==
After his second consecutive defeat, Catiline had probably run out of money and lost the support of former backers such as Crassus and Caesar. He afterwards began planning a coup to seize by force the consulship that had been denied him. On 18 or 19 October 63 BCE Crassus handed Cicero letters describing plans to massacre prominent citizens, the first concrete evidence of the Catilinarian conspiracy. Catiline's indebtedness – if he was in fact indebted, there is little evidence one way or the other – was not the sole cause; he was likely also unhappy about his electoral defeats and willing to use force to sate his ambitions.

Before Murena entered office he was accused of electoral bribery by Sulpicius. Cato had sworn to prosecute any successful candidate who had taken part in bribery, but ruled out pursuing his own brother-in-law Silanus, and so confined himself to Murena. The prosecution was presented by Sulpicius and Cato, then tribune-elect; Murena was defended by Crassus, Quintus Hortensius and Sulpicius' friend Cicero, in the extant speech Pro Murena, and was acquitted. In the speech Cicero took advantage of Cato's well-known Stoic principles to joke about their paradoxes.

Silanus and Murena took office in January 62 BCE. Together they passed the lex Junia Licinia, which provided that a rogatio must be promulgated three nundinae, or market-intervals, before the people voted on it, and which confirmed the lex Caecilia Didia.

== Sources ==
=== Modern sources ===
- Beard, Mary (2015). SPQR: A History of Ancient Rome (1st ed.). New York: Liveright Publishing. ISBN 978-0-87140-423-7.
- Berry, D. H. (2020). Cicero's Catilinarians. Oxford Approaches to Classical Literature. Oxford University Press. doi:10.1093/oso/9780195326468.001.0001. ISBN 978-0-19-532646-8.
- Broughton, Thomas Robert Shannon (1952). The Magistrates of the Roman Republic. Vol. 2. New York: American Philological Association.
- Drogula, Fred K. (2019). Cato the Younger: Life and Death at the End of the Roman Republic. New York: Oxford University Press. ISBN 978-0-19-086902-1.
- Gruen, Erich (1995) [1974]. The Last Generation of the Roman Republic. Berkeley: University of California Press. ISBN 0-520-02238-6.
- Holmes, T. Rice (1918). "Three Catilinarian dates" (PDF). Journal of Roman Studies. 8: 15–25. doi:10.2307/370149. JSTOR 370149.
- Lintott, Andrew (1999). The Constitution of the Roman Republic. Oxford University Press. doi:10.1093/oso/9780198150688.001.0001. ISBN 978-0-19-815068-8.
- Morrell, Kit (5 February 2021). "Review of Cato the Younger: Life and Death at the End of the Roman Republic". Bryn Mawr Classical Review.
- Hornblower, Simon; et al., eds. (2012). The Oxford Classical Dictionary (4th ed.). Oxford University Press. ISBN 978-0-19-954556-8.
  - Chilver, G. E. F.; Griffin, M. T. "Porcius Cato (2), Marcus, of Utica". In OCD^{4} (2012).
- Smith, William (1875). "Ambitus". A Dictionary of Greek and Roman Antiquities. London: John Murray.
- Vishnia, Rachel Feig (2012). Roman Elections in the Age of Cicero: Society, Government, and Voting. Routledge Studies in Ancient History. New York: Routledge. ISBN 978-0-415-87969-9.
- Waters, K. H. (1970). "Cicero, Sallust and Catiline". Historia: Zeitschrift für Alte Geschichte. 19 (2): 195–215. ISSN 0018-2311. JSTOR 4435130.
- Wiseman, T. P. (1994). "The senate and the populares, 69–60 BC". In Crook, J. A.; Lintott, Andrew; Rawson, Elizabeth (eds.). The Cambridge Ancient History. Vol. 9: The Last Age of the Roman Republic, 146–43 BC (2nd ed.). Cambridge University Press. pp. 327–367. ISBN 978-0-521-25603-2.

=== Ancient sources ===
- Asconius (2023). "Asconius' commentary on Cicero's speech as a candidate". In Cooley, M. G. L. (ed.). Cicero's Consulship Campaign. LACTOR Sourcebooks in Ancient History. Vol. 3 (2nd ed.). Cambridge University Press. pp. 29–37. doi:10.1017/9781009383547.005. ISBN 978-1-009-38356-1.
- Cicero (1937). In Catilinam 1–4. Pro Murena. Pro Sulla. Pro Flacco. Loeb Classical Library. Translated by Lord, Louis E. Harvard University Press.
- Plutarch (1919). "The life of Cato the Younger". Plutarch's Lives. Loeb Classical Library. Vol. 8. Translated by Perrin, Bernadotte. Harvard University Press – via LacusCurtius.
