= August 1400 imperial election =

- 21 August 1400

4 Prince-electors (Note: Only the four Rhenish electors were present. The remaining three—the deposed Bohemian king (Wenceslaus IV), the Duke of Saxony, and the Margrave of Brandenburg—stayed away because they did not recognize the legality of the deposition or the assembly.) 4 votes needed to win (Note: Four votes were required to establish an absolute majority of the seven recognized electoral seats.)
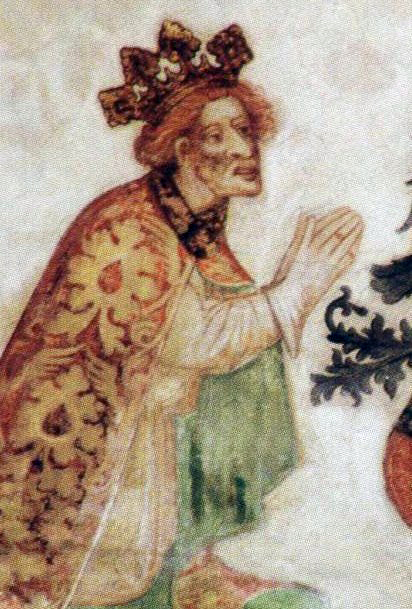
Candidate	Rupert
House	Wittelsbach
Electoral vote	4
Percentage	100%
King before election
Wenceslaus IV (Note: Deposed in favor of Rupert)
House of Luxembourg
Elected King
Rupert
House of Wittelsbach

The imperial election of 21 August 1400 was an imperial election held to select the King of the Holy Roman Empire. It took place in Rhens, Electorate of Trier.

== Background ==
Wenceslaus IV, King of Bohemia, had been elected King of the Romans in the Imperial election of 1376.

On 20 September 1378 the French cardinals elected Avignonian Antipope Clement VII in opposition to Roman Pope Urban VI, whom they had come to distrust. The existence of two popes in opposition to one another, called the Western Schism, led to escalating international crises as the kings of Europe were forced to choose sides. On 29 November Wenceslaus's father Charles IV, Holy Roman Emperor died, and Wenceslaus acceded to the throne. Civil unrest in Bohemia prevented Wenceslaus from effectively administering the empire; he declined even to have a coronation ceremony as Holy Roman Emperor.

Because of Wenceslaus's weak rule and his failure to stamp out civil unrest or resolve the Western Schism, three of the prince-electors of the empire convened to remove him at the Imperial election of 22 May 1400. However, the remaining electors, including Wenceslaus himself, did not accept the results of the election, and their candidate, Frederick I, Duke of Brunswick-Lüneburg, was murdered on 5 June.

Now four electors convened to depose Wenceslaus. They were:

- Johann II of Nassau, Archbishop of Mainz
- Werner of Falkenstein, Archbishop of Trier
- Frederick III of Saarwerden, Archbishop of Cologne
- Rupert III, King of the Romans, elector of the Electoral Palatinate (who had also participated in the May election).

They declared Wenceslaus deposed on 20 August.

== Elected ==
Rupert was elected on August 21, and became King of the Romans until his death in 1410.

== Aftermath ==
As Wenceslaus and the electors of Saxony and Brandenburg were absent, Wenceslaus did not recognize the validity of his deposition or Rupert's election. Neither did the Free Imperial City of Aachen allow him entrance. He was therefore crowned King of the Romans at Cologne on January 6, 1401 by Frederick III. Wenceslaus was arrested in March 1402 by his brother Sigismund, King of Hungary, who would later become Holy Roman Emperor himself in 1433, ending the resistance of his partisans.
