= 64 BCE Roman consular election =

Election of Roman consuls for 63 BCE

- July 64 BCE

193 centuries of the Centuriate Assembly 97 centuries needed to win
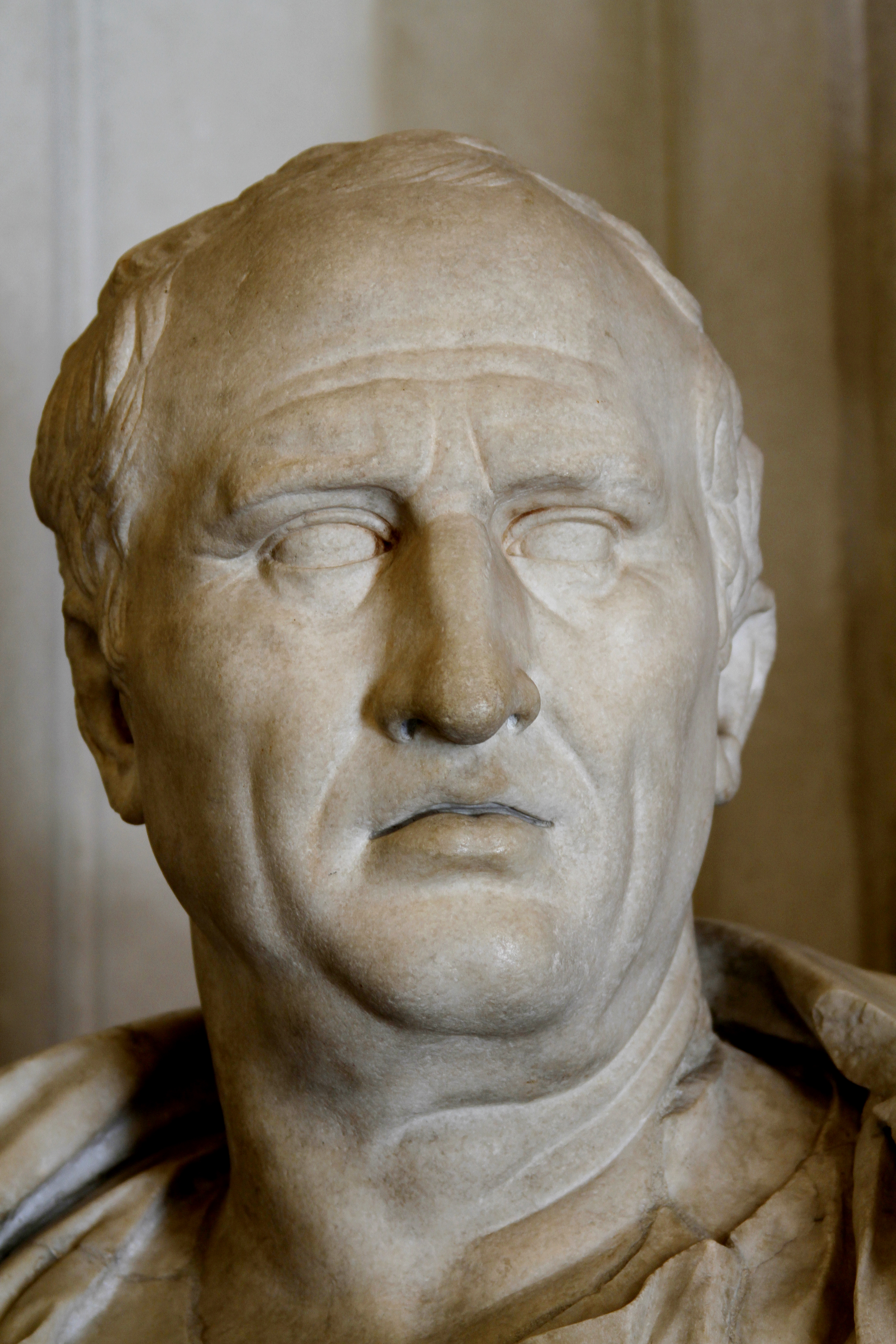

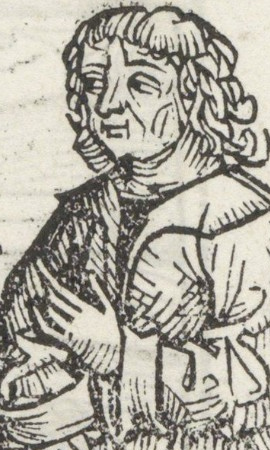

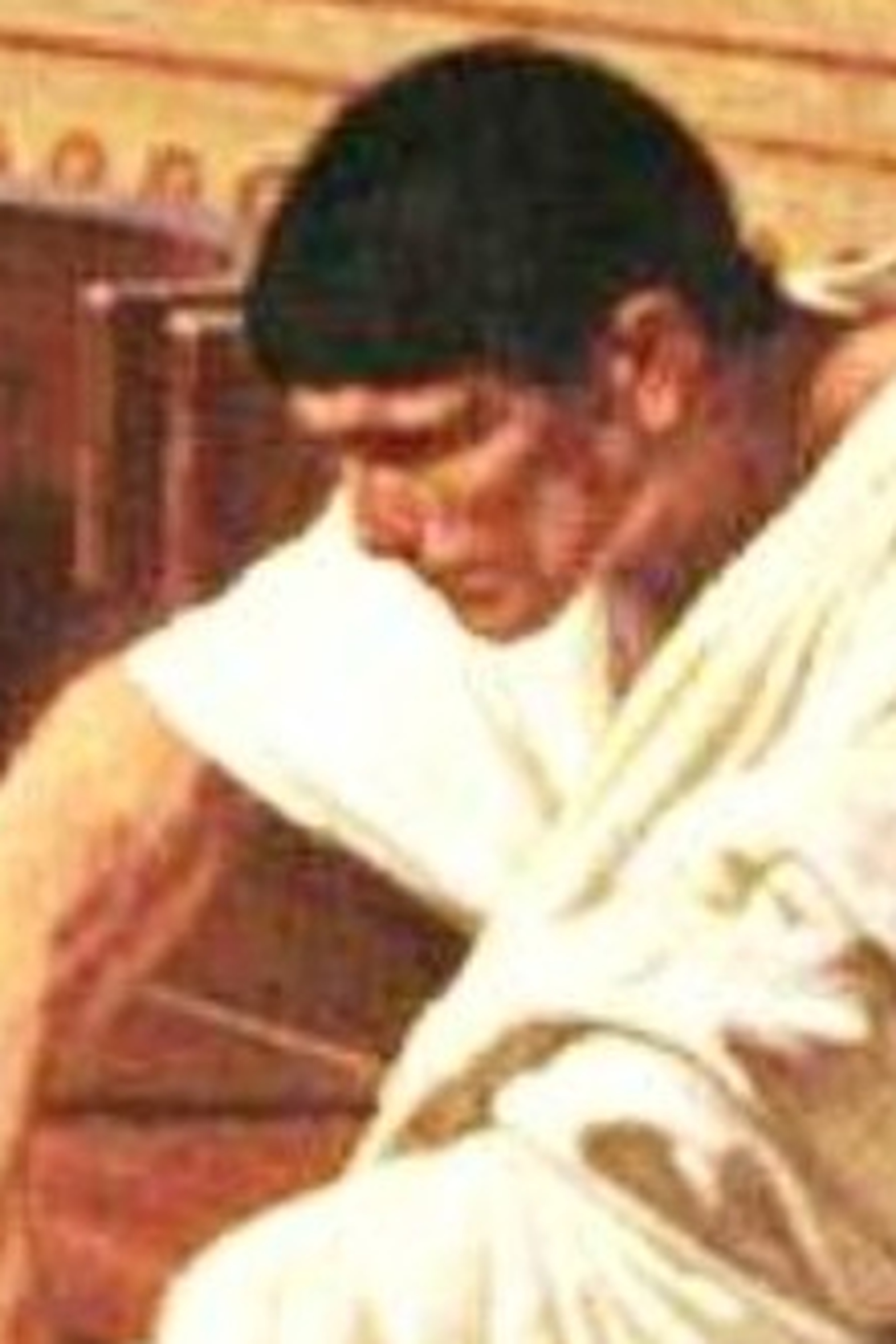
Candidate	Marcus Tullius Cicero	Gaius Antonius Hybrida	Lucius Sergius Catilina
Result	Elected (Note: Asconius describes Cicero's election as omnium consensu ("with the agreement of all").)	Elected (Note: Asconius states that Antonius surpassed Catiline by only a few centuries.)	Defeated
Consuls before election
Lucius Julius Caesar and
Gaius Marcius Figulus
Elected consuls
Marcus Tullius Cicero and
Gaius Antonius Hybrida

The 64 BCE Roman consular election was held in July 64 BCE to elect the two consuls of the Roman Republic for 63 BCE. Seven candidates stood for the two offices; Marcus Tullius Cicero and Gaius Antonius Hybrida were elected, while Lucius Sergius Catilina and four other candidates were defeated.

Cicero, Antonius and Catiline were the only candidates considered to have a realistic prospect of election. Antonius and Catiline formed an electoral alliance intended to exclude Cicero, while accusations of electoral bribery became an important issue during the campaign. Cicero attacked the pair shortly before the vote in his speech In Toga Candida. Cicero, a novus homo, secured one consulship with the unanimous support of all the centuries needed for a majority, while Antonius narrowly defeated Catiline for the other.

== Background ==
The politics of the Roman Republic was dominated by aristocratic families. The electoral system for the most powerful magistrates favoured richer voters, who tended to support candidates from a family of nobiles – those with ancestors who had previously held the office of consul. Those with a family reputation in politics, and a family name that could be recognised by the voters, regularly dominated electoral results. In contrast, Cicero was a novus homo (lit. 'new man'), the first of his family to be elected to public office; his father was a wealthy member of the equestrian order. He had risen through the series of increasingly powerful offices that formed the cursus honorum and was now standing for the consulship.

The election also followed a recent bribery scandal. The first consular comitia of 66 BCE returned Publius Autronius Paetus and Publius Cornelius Sulla for the consulships of 65 BCE, but both were convicted of bribery and deposed; a second election, held with the same candidates less the two convicts, returned two different consuls. The corrupt winners were removed from the Senate and disqualified from office for ten years.

== Electoral system ==
The consuls were elected by the comitia centuriata, which was made up of 193 voting units called centuries, apportioned to Roman citizens by wealth and age and hugely overweighting the old and wealthy. Its meetings took place on the Campus Martius.

Citizens voted in person for their candidate, and each unit registered one vote for each open post; because two consulships were open, a century would vote for two candidates. Once a candidate received a majority of 97 centuries he won and was removed from the contest. Once all posts were filled, voting ended and all centuries that had not voted were dismissed.

Assembly procedure was weighted towards the upper classes. The first class and the equestrians voted first, and their votes were tallied and announced; the classes then voted in descending order of wealth. Because the equestrians, first class and second class made up a clear majority of voting units, the lower census classes would never be called on if they were in agreement, and poorer citizens were only called when the elite was divided.

== Candidates ==
An unusually large number of candidates stood in the election, with seven men standing for the two positions. Two were patricians: Catiline and Publius Sulpicius Galba. Five were plebeians: Antonius, Cicero, Lucius Cassius Longinus, Quintus Cornificius and Gaius Licinius Sacerdos. Catiline, Galba, Antonius and Longinus were all nobiles, while Cicero alone was of equestrian birth.

Candidate	Background	Result
Marcus Tullius Cicero	Plebeian; equestrian-born novus homo	Elected
Gaius Antonius Hybrida	Plebeian nobilis	Elected
Lucius Sergius Catilina	Patrician nobilis	Defeated
Publius Sulpicius Galba	Patrician nobilis	Defeated
Lucius Cassius Longinus	Plebeian nobilis	Defeated
Quintus Cornificius	Plebeian	Defeated
Gaius Licinius Sacerdos	Plebeian	Defeated

Only Cicero, Antonius and Catiline were considered to have a realistic chance of winning. Catiline was a member of an ancient patrician family, the gens Sergia; he had served as praetor by 68 BCE and then as propraetorian governor of Africa from 67 to 66 BCE. On his return to Rome embassies from Africa protested his maladministration, and the presiding magistrate rejected his candidacy for the consulship. He was brought to trial for corruption during his governorship in the second half of 65 BCE and acquitted on a split jury, the panel of senators voting for conviction and those of the equites and tribuni aerarii for acquittal.

Antonius accompanied Sulla into Greece as either a military tribune or a legate, and was left to command a small cavalry force in Achaea when Sulla returned to Italy. In 70 BCE the censors expelled him from the Senate for the offences he had committed in Greece, for disobeying the summons of a praetor and for the wasteful use of his property. He regained his seat in 68 or 66 BCE after being elected praetor.

== Campaign ==
Candidates campaigned largely on their own personal virtue, personal or family reputation, or gifts distributed to voters. They wore a bright white toga (toga candida) and met voters in person in the forum, accompanied by large groups of supporters to build prestige. This campaign is the subject of the Commentariolum Petitionis, an essay supposedly written by Cicero's brother Quintus as a guide for it, which recommends cultivating the favour of various groups, currying undecided voters, and avoiding state affairs entirely. Its authenticity is disputed, and the degree to which it can be used as evidence for the electoral process and the politics of the late Republic is therefore contested.

In an attempt to secure their joint election, Catiline and Antonius formed an alliance and engaged in electoral bribery, backed by funds from Marcus Licinius Crassus and facilitated by Gaius Julius Caesar.

Concerned by the increasing use of bribery, the Senate proposed stricter rules against ambitus. The Senate, however, was not a legislative body, so its proposed law had to be voted on by the tribal assembly. When that assembly was held, the law was vetoed by Quintus Mucius Orestinus, one of the tribunes of the plebs, preventing it from being passed. As an explanation of his veto, Orestinus made a speech declaring that Cicero was unworthy to become consul. Cicero had previously defended Orestinus in a legal case, securing his acquittal, and regarded his behaviour as a breach of their patron–client relationship.

The Senate debated the issue again on the day after the bill was vetoed, and Cicero was called upon to speak. He had prepared a speech attacking the characters of Catiline and Antonius and the veto applied by Orestinus, avoiding directly naming Crassus and Caesar but alluding to their roles as key supporters and enablers of the bribery. The speech, In Toga Candida, was delivered a few days before the election. Its full text has been lost, but over a thousand words of it are preserved in quotation by Asconius, who wrote a detailed commentary on it about a century later.

In the speech, Cicero accused Catiline and Antonius of having met with a prominent citizen – probably Crassus or Caesar – to organise bribery. He called Catiline a murderer for his role in Sulla's proscriptions, particularly the execution of Marcus Marius Gratidianus and the parading of Gratidianus' severed head through the city, and pointed out that Catiline openly admitted his actions during the proscriptions while similar actions by other supporters of Sulla had resulted in criminal convictions. Cicero also decried Catiline's rapacious governorship of Africa, noting that he had withdrawn from a previous consular election because he was being prosecuted for extortion there. Some modern historians doubt that Catiline was involved in Gratidianus' death except perhaps in an auxiliary role, placing blame instead on Catulus and attributing the story of Catiline's involvement to Ciceronian political slander.

Although most of the speech was directed at Catiline, Cicero also attacked Antonius and Orestinus. Like Catiline, Antonius was criticised for his role in Sulla's regime and proscriptions. Cicero described him as a robber, as acting like a gladiator, and as having appeared as a driver in Sulla's chariot races; gladiator and chariot driver were both considered dishonourable occupations, performed by slaves rather than Roman citizens, still less by senators. Orestinus was accused of obstructing both the existing bribery law and the Senate's proposal to strengthen it.

== Election ==
The election took place in July 64 BCE. Cicero won with the unanimous support of all the centuries that were called to vote. (Note: Voting was halted once the outcome became inevitable, so some of the poorer centuries were not consulted.) Antonius secured the second consulship, defeating Catiline by only a few centuries.

== Aftermath ==
Cicero and Antonius reconciled before their terms as consul began, because Cicero offered Antonius the potentially lucrative proconsulship of the province of Macedonia after the end of their term. The two cooperated throughout their year in office.

Catiline was incensed, both by the electoral rejection and by Cicero's tactics of invective personal attack. This was his second unsuccessful attempt to secure the consulship, and he was left almost bankrupt by the campaign, especially by the bribes. After the election he was prosecuted again, this time for murder during the proscriptions, perhaps that of Gratidianus; he was acquitted when a number of former consuls spoke in his defence.

In the following summer Catiline stood again for the consulship, this time for 62 BCE. Against him were three other major candidates: Decimus Junius Silanus, Lucius Licinius Murena and Servius Sulpicius Rufus. The comitia returned Silanus and Murena as consuls-designate.

Cicero and Antonius were confronted during their consulship by the Catilinarian conspiracy, an attempt by Catiline to seize control of the Roman state by force. Antonius was dispatched at the head of an army to subdue him.

== Sources ==
=== Modern sources ===
- Alexander, Michael Charles (1990). Trials in the Late Roman Republic, 149 BC to 50 BC. Phoenix. Vol. 26. University of Toronto Press. ISBN 0-8020-5787-X.
- Badian, Ernst (22 December 2015). "Antonius, Gaius, 'Hybrida'". Oxford Classical Dictionary. Oxford University Press. doi:10.1093/acrefore/9780199381135.013.553.
- Berry, D. H. (2020). Cicero's Catilinarians. Oxford Approaches to Classical Literature. Oxford University Press. doi:10.1093/oso/9780195326468.001.0001. ISBN 978-0-19-532646-8.
- Broughton, Thomas Robert Shannon (1952). The Magistrates of the Roman Republic. Vol. 2. New York: American Philological Association.
- Cowan, Robert (2020). "Not the Consular Year: Perverting Annalistic Time in Sallust". Histos. 14: 70–115. doi:10.29173/histos441. ISSN 2046-5963.
- Lintott, Andrew (1990). "Electoral bribery in the Roman Republic". Journal of Roman Studies. 80: 1–16. doi:10.2307/300277.
- Lintott, Andrew (1999). The Constitution of the Roman Republic. Oxford University Press. doi:10.1093/oso/9780198150688.001.0001. ISBN 978-0-19-815068-8.
- Lintott, Andrew (7 February 2008). "Candidature and Consulship". Cicero as Evidence: A Historian's Companion. Oxford University Press. pp. 129–148. doi:10.1093/acprof:oso/9780199216444.003.0010. ISBN 978-0-19-921644-4. "Cicero was elected consul by the unanimous vote of all the centuries required to give him the necessary majority"
- Marshall, Bruce (1985). "Catilina and the execution of M. Marius Gratidianus". Classical Quarterly. 35 (1): 124–133. doi:10.1017/S0009838800014610. ISSN 1471-6844.
- Powell, Jonathan G. F. (22 December 2015). "Commentariolum petitionis". Oxford Classical Dictionary. Oxford University Press. doi:10.1093/acrefore/9780199381135.013.1752.
- Vishnia, Rachel Feig (2012). Roman Elections in the Age of Cicero: Society, Government, and Voting. Routledge Studies in Ancient History. New York: Routledge. ISBN 978-0-415-87969-9.
- Wiseman, T. P. (1994). "The senate and the populares, 69–60 BC". In Crook, J. A.; Lintott, Andrew; Rawson, Elizabeth (eds.). The Cambridge Ancient History. Vol. 9: The Last Age of the Roman Republic, 146–43 BC (2nd ed.). Cambridge University Press. pp. 327–367. ISBN 978-0-521-25603-2.

=== Ancient sources ===
- Asconius (2023). "Asconius' commentary on Cicero's speech as a candidate". In Cooley, M. G. L. (ed.). Cicero's Consulship Campaign: A Selection of Sources Relating to Cicero's Election as Consul for 63 BC, Including 'A Short Guide to Electioneering'. LACTOR Sourcebooks in Ancient History. Vol. 3 (2nd ed.). Cambridge University Press. pp. 29–37. doi:10.1017/9781009383547.005. ISBN 978-1-009-38356-1.
- Plutarch (1919) [2nd century AD]. Life of Cicero. Loeb Classical Library. Vol. 7. Translated by Perrin, Bernadotte. Harvard University Press – via LacusCurtius.
