= In Toga Candida =

Speech by Cicero

In Toga Candida was a speech given by the Roman orator Marcus Tullius Cicero in 64 BC, shortly before the election of the consuls for 63 BC. Cicero was standing in that election and used the speech to attack two rival candidates, Lucius Sergius Catilina (known in English as Catiline) and Gaius Antonius Hybrida. Catiline and Hybrida had formed an alliance and were attempting to bribe the electorate.

Cicero's speech was an invective attack on the character and conduct of Catiline, whom he accused of multiple crimes and immoral conduct. The speech also included lesser attacks on Hybrida and on a tribune who had publicly criticised Cicero. These tactics were successful in convincing the senators to support Cicero in the election, which he won a few days later. Hybrida was elected as Cicero's consular colleague and they soon reconciled. Catiline was incensed; he began a conspiracy to murder Cicero and seize power by force.

The full text of the speech has been lost, but over a thousand words of it have been preserved in quotation by Asconius, who wrote a detailed commentary on the speech about a century after it was given, which has survived.

== Name ==
The conventional Latin title of the speech is Oratio in Toga Candida, lit. 'speech in a whitened garment' or 'speech in a white gown'. The toga was a cloth robe worn by male Roman citizens on formal occasions. It was typically made of undyed wool, though magistrates were identified by a Tyrrhenian purple stripe on their toga. While a politician was actively campaigning for an election, it was traditional for their toga to be made a more brilliant white (candidus), by bleaching the wool then rubbing it with chalk. The resulting garment was known as the toga candida; this is the origin of the English word 'candidate'. Therefore the title of the speech can also be translated as 'speech as a candidate' or 'speech while dressed for an election'.

== Political context ==
The politics of the Roman Republic was dominated by aristocratic families. The electoral system for the most powerful magistrates (by the centuriate assembly) favoured richer voters, who tended to support candidates from a family of nobiles – those with ancestors who had previously held the office of consul (head of state). In contrast, Cicero was a novus homo lit. 'new man', the first of his family to be elected to public office. He had risen through the series of increasingly powerful offices that formed the cursus honorum and was now standing for the position of consul.

Two consuls were elected each summer for a one-year term that began in the following January. In the early Republic the position had been monopolised by the patricians, but over the centuries laws had been put in place to limit their dominance. By the late Republic, only one of the consuls each year could be a patrician; one or two of those elected had to be plebeian.

For the consular elections of 64 BC, there were an unusually large number of candidates, with seven men standing for the two positions. Two were patricians: Catiline and Publius Sulpicius Galba. Five were plebeians: Hybrida, Cicero, Lucius Cassius Longinus, Quintus Cornificius and Gaius Licinius Sacerdos. Catiline, Galba, Hybrida and Longinus were all nobiles. In an attempt to secure their joint election, Catiline and Hybrida had formed an alliance (akin to a modern joint ticket) and were engaging in electoral bribery, backed by funds from Marcus Licinius Crassus and facilitated by Gaius Julius Caesar.

Concerned by the increasing use of bribery, the Roman Senate proposed stricter rules against it. (Note: The existing law was the Lex Acilia Calpurnia.) The Senate, however, was not a legislative body, so its proposed law had to be voted on by the tribal assembly. When that assembly was held, the law was vetoed by Quintus Mucius Orestinus, one of the tribunes of the plebs, preventing it from being passed. As an explanation of his veto, Orestinus made a speech declaring that Cicero was unworthy to become consul. Cicero had previously defended Orestinus in a legal case, securing his acquittal, so felt that Orestinus was obliged to support him and that his behaviour was a breach of their patron-client relationship.

The Senate debated the issue again on the day after the bill was vetoed; Cicero was called upon to speak. He had prepared a speech to attack the characters of Catiline and Hybrida and the veto applied by Orestinus. He avoided directly naming Crassus and Caesar, but alluded to their roles as key supporters and enablers of the bribery.

== Contents ==
In the speech, Cicero accused Catiline and Hybrida as having met with a 'prominent citizen' (probably Crassus or Caesar) to organise bribery. He calls Catiline a murderer for the latter's role in Sulla's proscriptions, particularly his execution of Marcus Marius Gratidianus and parading of Gratidianus' severed head through the city. He points out that Catiline openly admitted his actions during the proscriptions, while similar actions by other supporters of Sulla had resulted in criminal convictions.

Cicero also decries Catiline's rapacious governorship of Africa, pointing out that Catiline had withdrawn from a previous consular election because he was being prosecuted for extortion in Africa. That case ended in Catiline being acquitted, but Cicero obliquely criticises the judge and prosecutor in the case (the latter was Catiline's friend Publius Clodius Pulcher) without naming them. Catiline is also attacked as an adulterer and for his impious behaviour which had led to the prosecution of a Vestal virgin (Fabia, the sister of Cicero's wife Terentia, who was acquitted).

Cicero alleges that Catiline conspired with Gnaeus Calpurnius Piso (Note: This Piso was the father of the identically named Gnaeus Calpurnius Piso (consul 23 BC).) to murder members of the Senate, and began a separate conspiracy with a gladiator named Licinius. This passage, along with other indirect mentions in other ancient sources, was formerly interpreted as evidence for a first Catilinarian conspiracy in 65 BC. However, modern historians almost universally agree that this conspiracy either never existed, or was exaggerated by Cicero and Sallust.

Although most of the speech is directed at Catiline, Cicero also directly attacks Hybrida and Orestinus. Like Catiline, Hybrida is criticised for his role in Sulla's regime and proscriptions. Cicero describes Hybrida as a robber, as acting like a gladiator, and as having appeared as a driver in Sulla's chariot races. Gladiator and chariot driver were both considered dishonourable occupations; they were performed by slaves not Roman citizens, and certainly not senators.

He argues that Orestinus was confident in Cicero's abilities when appointing him as a defence lawyer, yet now asks the Roman people not to place confidence in Cicero as consul. Orestinus is accused of obstructing both the existing bribery law and the Senate's proposal to strengthen it.

== Aftermath ==
Cicero's speech was successful in persuading the conservative senators to support his candidacy over that of Catiline. With the senators came the support of their clients. In the election held a few days later, Cicero won with unanimous support from all the centuries that were called to vote. (Note: Voting was always halted once the outcome became inevitable, so some of the poorer centuries were not consulted.) Hybrida secured the second consulship, while Catiline came third so was not elected.

Cicero and Hybrida reconciled before their terms as consul began, because Cicero offered Hybrida the potentially lucrative proconsulship of the province of Macedonia after the end of their term. The two cooperated throughout their year in office. Cicero would later unsuccessfully defend Hybrida in court, when the latter was prosecuted for his actions in Macedonia.

Conversely, Catiline was incensed, both by the electoral rejection and Cicero's tactics of invective personal attacks. This was Catiline's second unsuccessful attempt to secure the consulship and he was left almost bankrupt by the campaign, especially the bribes. He resolved to seize power by force and began recruiting other discontented politicians to organise a coup. The resulting Catilinarian conspiracy planned to kill Cicero and Hybrida, then take control of the government using an armed force. Responding to the conspiracy would dominate Cicero's consulship, during which he delivered several further speeches attacking Catiline, known as the Catilinarian orations. Catiline fled to his rebel army and was killed in battle, while Cicero executed several of Catiline's supporters without a trial - an action which would haunt his subsequent career and lead to Cicero's exile by Clodius.

== Textual transmission ==
It is unknown when the text of In Toga Candida was originally published. Some of Cicero's speeches were published during his lifetime, and rapid dissemination would have enhanced his attacks against Catiline, but there was insufficient time to do so between the delivery of the speech and the election. It is possible that publication occurred in 60 BC, the year that the closely related Catilinarian orations are known to have been published. However, if they were published together, it is surprising that In Toga Candida has been lost, while Cicero's other speeches against Catiline were preserved. Alternatively, it may have been one of the speeches published by Cicero's secretary Tiro, after Cicero's death in 43 BC.

A commentary on the speech was written by Asconius between 54 and 57 AD. Asconius provides background on each of the candidates in the election, then quotes numerous passages of Cicero's speech, interspersing them with his own historical comments and observations. Asconius' comments are themselves a useful source, providing more historical information than the quotations of Cicero's words. A single manuscript of Asconius's commentary survived in 1416, when it was discovered by Poggio Bracciolini in the Abbey library of Saint Gall. The St Gall manuscript has since been lost, but three copies of it are known to have been made after Poggio's discovery, two of which survive today: in Madrid and at the Biblioteca Forteguerriana in Pistoia.
