= 60 BCE Roman consular election =

Election of Roman consuls for 59 BCE

- 60 BCE

193 centuries of the Centuriate Assembly 97 centuries needed to win
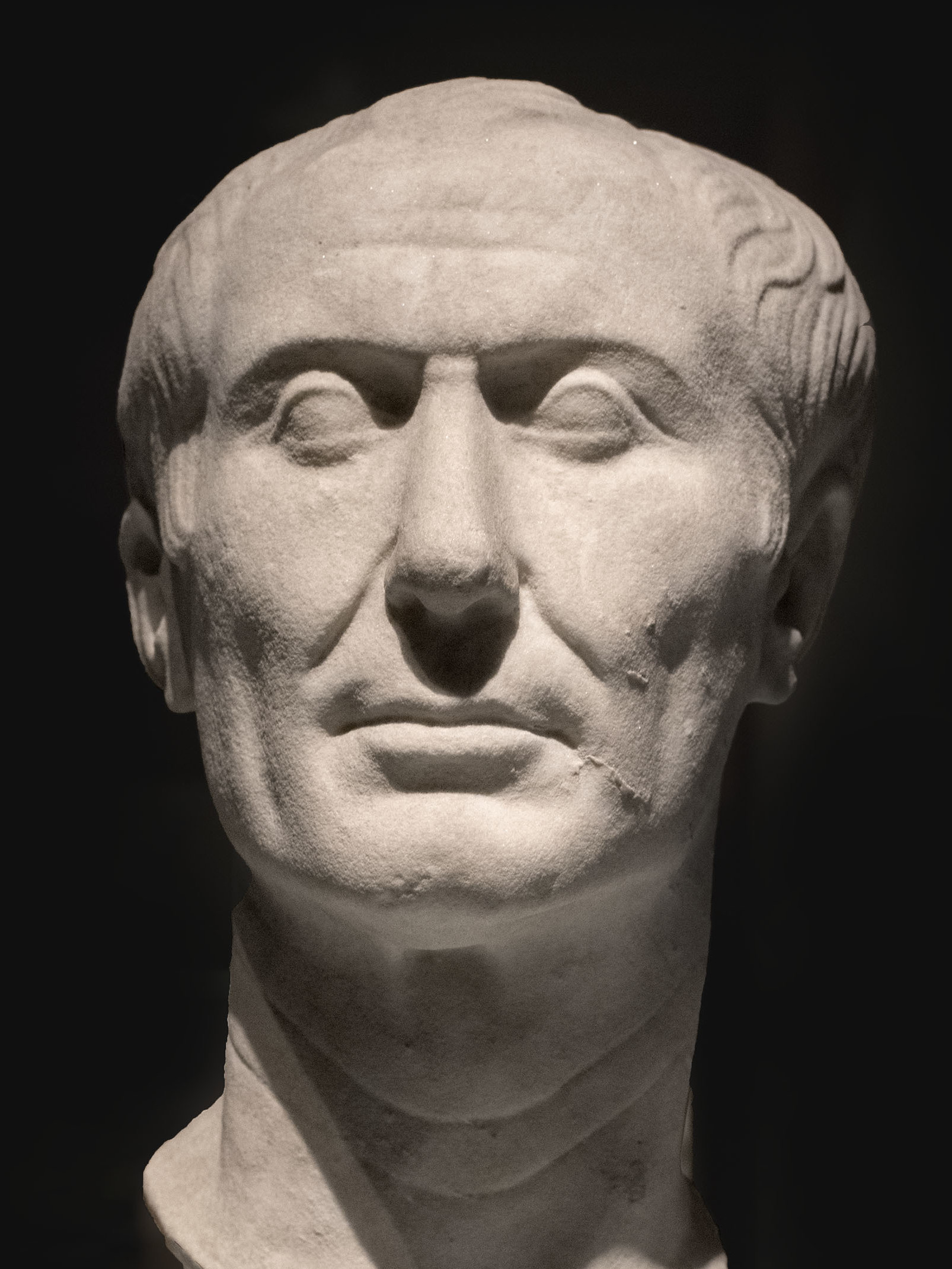

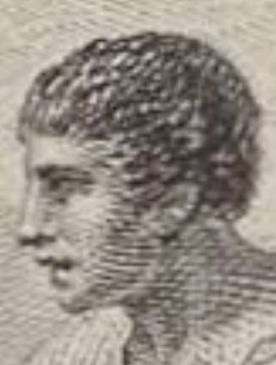
Candidate	Gaius Julius Caesar	Marcus Calpurnius Bibulus	Lucius Lucceius
Result	Elected	Elected	Defeated
Consuls before election
Quintus Caecilius Metellus Celer and
Lucius Afranius
Elected consuls
Gaius Julius Caesar and
Marcus Calpurnius Bibulus

The 60 BCE Roman consular election was held to elect the two consuls of the Roman Republic for 59 BCE. Gaius Julius Caesar and Marcus Calpurnius Bibulus were elected, defeating Lucius Lucceius.

Returning from a command in Further Spain in June, Caesar was forced to choose between a triumph and the consulship: a candidate had to declare in person inside the city, which a general could not enter without giving up his command. Attempts to waive the requirement were filibustered in the Senate by Cato, and Caesar gave up the triumph to stand. He campaigned on a joint ticket with Lucceius, who provided much of the money for bribes; Cato and his allies matched the sums to secure the second place for Bibulus, his son-in-law, who was expected to counterbalance Caesar with his consular veto. Caesar afterwards reconciled Pompey and Crassus in the alliance later called the First Triumvirate.

== Background ==
Pompey, back from the east, sought senatorial ratification of his settlements there and land grants for his veterans. Lucius Licinius Lucullus, whom Pompey had replaced in command, stalled the entire process by having each element reviewed in committee before separate votes on each part, and was supported in this by the consul Quintus Caecilius Metellus Celer, Cato and Crassus; the combined influence of the four prevented Pompey from securing any of his main goals. Cato also filibustered an attempt by Crassus to reduce the sums owed by the publicani who farmed the taxes of Asia. His success against both men forced them to recalculate, since both represented vital commitments each had made to key supporters.

Bribery was an ordinary part of canvassing, and large payments to voters were normal in an expensive political environment. To secure the election of his legate Lucius Afranius as consul for 60 BCE, Pompey had distributed enormous bribes among the voters; Cato responded by championing a bribery bill, brought by the tribune Marcus Aufidius Lurco, which was defeated, in part because the voters liked receiving payments for their votes. The existing statute on bribery, the lex Tullia, passed during Cicero's consulship of 63 BCE, punished ambitus with ten years' exile and forbade candidates to give public shows in the two years before standing or to hire persons to attend them.

Cato may also have promoted a law requiring candidates to declare their candidacy in person before a magistrate within the city. Such a law precluded a general from holding a military command and standing for office at the same time, since entering the pomerium vitiated promagisterial imperium. It may have been aimed at Pompey, who was thought to want a further consulship on his return, or at Caesar, to force him to choose between the consulship and military glory.

== Electoral system ==
The consuls were elected by the comitia centuriata, which was made up of 193 voting units called centuries, apportioned to Roman citizens by wealth and age and hugely overweighting the old and wealthy. Its meetings took place on the Campus Martius.

Citizens voted in person for their candidate, and each unit registered one vote for each open post; because two consulships were open, a century would vote for two candidates. Once a candidate received a majority of 97 centuries he won and was removed from the contest. Once all posts were filled, voting ended and all centuries that had not voted were dismissed.

Assembly procedure was weighted towards the upper classes. The first class and the equestrians voted first, and their votes were tallied and announced; the classes then voted in descending order of wealth. Because the equestrians, first class and second class made up a clear majority of voting units, the lower census classes would never be called on if they were in agreement, and poorer citizens were only called when the elite was divided.

== Candidates ==
Three men stood for the two positions. By the late Republic only one of the consuls each year could be a patrician; at least one of those elected had to be plebeian.

Candidates for the consulship of 59 BCE
Candidate	Background	Result
Gaius Julius Caesar	Patrician; praetor in 62 BCE, afterwards governor of Further Spain	Elected
Marcus Calpurnius Bibulus	Plebeian; curule aedile in 65 BCE and praetor in 62 BCE	Elected
Lucius Lucceius	Praetor in 67 BCE	Defeated

Caesar had been born into the patrician gens Julia. In Spain he had campaigned against the Callaeci and Lusitani and taken enough plunder to pay his debts, and he returned to Rome, having been hailed imperator, claiming the conquest of the peninsula was complete.

Bibulus was a member of the plebeian gens Calpurnia, his branch of the family likely descended from the Calpurnii Pisones; although he was the first of his name to reach the consulship, his connections in the republican aristocracy precluded him from being a novus homo. He had been Caesar's colleague in both of those magistracies and had clashed with him politically in each. He had married Cato's daughter some time after his aedileship, cementing a strong political alliance; he also nursed a particular hatred of Caesar, likely stemming from Caesar's monopolisation of the credit for their joint aedileship.

Lucceius had attempted to prosecute Lucius Sergius Catilina in 64 BCE and had supported Cicero against him during the Catilinarian conspiracy the following year. He had hesitated over seeking the consulship, withdrawing from the canvasses for the consulships of 61 and 60 BCE because of competition from Pompey's candidates.

== Campaign ==
Caesar returned from Spain in June 60 BCE. The law requiring candidates to declare in person within the city forced a choice upon him: he could either enter the city and give up his command in order to stand, or retain the command in hope of a triumph. He asked the Senate to release him from the requirement, a dispensation that was normal enough and which the Senate appeared willing to grant, but Cato filibustered the request. Caesar gave up his triumph and stood.

Caesar entered the canvass with broad support. He had supporters among the families which had backed Marius or Cinna, his connection with the Sullan aristocracy was good, and his support of Pompey had won him support in turn; his advocacy of reconciliation in the continuing aftershocks of Sulla's civil war was popular in all parts of society. Standing in the summer of 60 BCE, he formed a joint ticket with Lucceius, a rich man who provided much of the money and bribes in their canvass; the ticket also had the backing of Crassus.

Taking it as near certain that Caesar would be one of the victors, Cato and his allies sought to have Bibulus returned as his colleague, and did so partly by ignoring their own declared position on bribery and matching the enormous sums paid out by Caesar and Lucceius. With that effort, together with more licit canvassing, Cato's faction secured his election.

Cato and his allies also sought to discourage Caesar's campaign by having the consuls of 59 BCE assigned an unimportant task in Italy. Suetonius reports that the Senate designated the silvae callesque ("woods and tracks") as the consular province, but this is likely an exaggeration: fear of a Gallic invasion had grown during 60 BCE, and the consuls were more probably assigned to Italy in a defensive posture that Caesarian partisans dismissed as mere forest tracks. Cisalpine and Transalpine Gaul, which Caesar would eventually hold, had in any case been assigned to the consuls of 60 BCE and were unavailable.

== Election ==
The election was held in 60 BCE, on a date that is not recorded. Caesar and Bibulus won the two consulships; Lucceius was defeated. Bibulus's presence as consul was expected to counterbalance Caesar through the consular veto.

== Aftermath ==
After the failed campaign Lucceius evidently gave up hopes of a consulship; he remained active at Rome but turned his pursuits to history, and by 56 BCE had written an account of the Social War and the civil war that followed it.

Cato's successful opposition to Pompey and Crassus seemed to bode poorly for Caesar's prospects on entering the consulship. Caesar was still at work in December 60 BCE attempting to find allies, and the alliance among the three men was settled only around the start of his consular year. Pompey and Crassus joined it in pursuit of their respective goals, the ratification of Pompey's eastern settlements and relief for the tax farmers of Asia, while all three sought the extended patronage that land grants would bring. The arrangement was informal and secret, and is misleadingly known in modern times as the First Triumvirate.

The expectation that Bibulus would restrain Caesar through the consular veto proved unfounded. Defeated on Caesar's agrarian legislation, he withdrew to his house, from which he issued edicts purporting to cancel all the days on which Caesar or his allies could hold votes.

== Sources ==
=== Modern sources ===
- Badian, Ernst (2012). "Lucceius, Lucius". In Hornblower, Simon; et al. (eds.). The Oxford Classical Dictionary (4th ed.). Oxford University Press. doi:10.1093/acrefore/9780199381135.013.3777. ISBN 978-0-19-954556-8.
- Berry, D. H. (2020). Cicero's Catilinarians. Oxford University Press. ISBN 978-0-19-751081-0. LCCN 2019048911. OCLC 1126348418.
- Broughton, Thomas Robert Shannon (1952). The Magistrates of the Roman Republic. Vol. 2. New York: American Philological Association.
- Drogula, Fred K. (2019). Cato the Younger: Life and Death at the End of the Roman Republic. New York: Oxford University Press. ISBN 978-0-19-086902-1.
- Griffin, Miriam, ed. (2009). A Companion to Julius Caesar. Malden, MA: Wiley-Blackwell. ISBN 978-1-4443-0845-7.
  - Badian, Ernst. "From the Iulii to Caesar". In Griffin (2009), pp. 11–22.
  - Gruen, Erich S. "Caesar as a politician". In Griffin (2009), pp. 23–36.
- Gruen, Erich (1995) [1974]. The Last Generation of the Roman Republic. Berkeley: University of California Press. ISBN 0-520-02238-6.
- Lintott, Andrew (1999). The Constitution of the Roman Republic. Oxford University Press. doi:10.1093/oso/9780198150688.001.0001. ISBN 978-0-19-815068-8.
- Morstein-Marx, Robert (2021). Julius Caesar and the Roman People. Cambridge University Press. doi:10.1017/9781108943260. ISBN 978-1-108-83784-2. LCCN 2021024626.
- Münzer, Friedrich (1927). "Lucceius 6" . Realencyclopädie der classischen Altertumswissenschaft (in German). Vol. XIII, 2. Stuttgart: Butcher. cols. 1554–1559 – via Wikisource.
- Rafferty, David (2017). "Cisalpine Gaul as a consular province in the late Republic". Historia: Zeitschrift für Alte Geschichte. 66 (2): 147–172. doi:10.25162/historia-2017-0008. ISSN 0018-2311. JSTOR 45019257.
- Smith, William (1875). "Ambitus". A Dictionary of Greek and Roman Antiquities. London: John Murray.
- Syme, Ronald (1987). "M. Bibulus and four sons". Harvard Studies in Classical Philology. 91: 185–198. doi:10.2307/311404. JSTOR 311404.
- Vishnia, Rachel Feig (2012). Roman Elections in the Age of Cicero: Society, Government, and Voting. Routledge Studies in Ancient History. New York: Routledge. ISBN 978-0-415-87969-9.

=== Ancient sources ===
- Plutarch (1919). "Life of Caesar". Parallel Lives. Loeb Classical Library. Vol. 7. Translated by Perrin, Bernadotte. Harvard University Press – via LacusCurtius.
- Suetonius (1913–1914). "Life of Caesar". Lives of the Twelve Caesars. Loeb Classical Library. Translated by Rolfe, J. C. Cambridge: Heinemann – via LacusCurtius.
