= May 1400 imperial election =

Election for Holy Roman Emperor

- 22 May 1400

The imperial election of 22 May 1400 was an imperial election held to select the emperor of the Holy Roman Empire. It took place in Frankfurt.

== Background ==
Wenceslaus IV, king of Bohemia, had been elected Holy Roman Emperor in the imperial election of 1376. On 29 November Wenceslaus's father Charles IV, Holy Roman Emperor died, and Wenceslaus acceded to the throne. Civil unrest in Bohemia prevented Wenceslaus from effectively administering the empire or to seek coronation as Holy Roman Emperor.

Because of Wenceslaus's weak rule and his failure to stamp out civil unrest or resolve the Western Schism, three of the prince-electors of the empire convened to remove him. They were:

- Rupert, King of Germany, elector of the Electoral Palatinate
- Rudolf III, Duke of Saxe-Wittenberg, elector of Saxony
- Jobst of Moravia, elector of Brandenburg

== Elected ==
The three electors at Frankfurt chose Frederick I, Duke of Brunswick-Lüneburg. However, the election did not have legal force as neither Johann II von Nassau, elector of Mainz, nor Werner of Falkenstein, elector of Trier, nor Frederick III of Saardwerden, elector of Cologne, nor Wenceslaus himself, who as king of Bohemia was an elector of the Holy Roman Empire, recognized it.

== Aftermath ==
Frederick I was murdered on his way home from the meeting on 5 June by Henry VII, Count of Waldeck.
