= 1438 imperial election =

- 18 March 1438

6 Prince-electors (Note: Albert II, who held the seventh electoral vote as King of Bohemia, was absent from the election as he was suppressing an uprising in Bohemia.) 4 votes needed to win
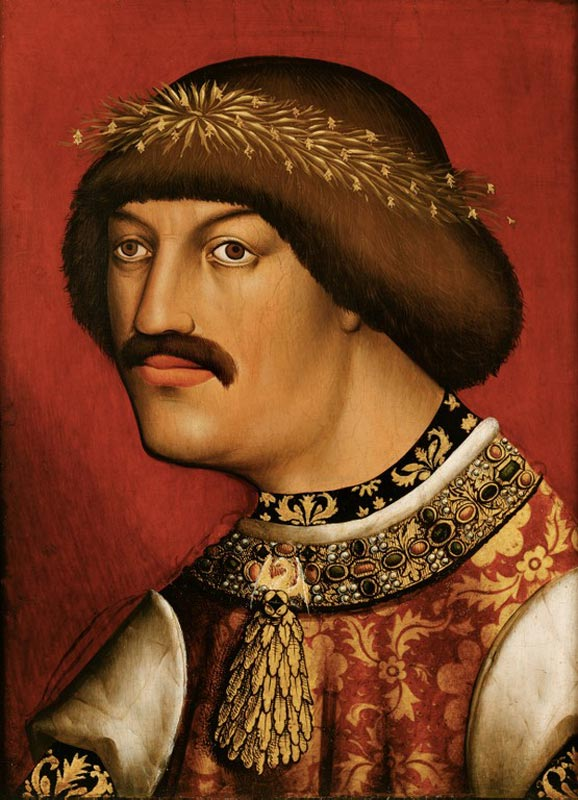
Candidate	Albert II
House	Habsburg
Electoral vote	6
Percentage	100%
King before election
Sigismund
House of Luxembourg
Elected King
Albert II
House of Habsburg

The imperial election of 1438 was an imperial election held to select the emperor of the Holy Roman Empire. It took place in Frankfurt on 18 March.

== Background ==
Sigismund, Holy Roman Emperor, died on 9 December 1437. His son-in-law Albert II of Germany succeeded him as Jure uxoris king of Hungary, Croatia and Bohemia.

The prince-electors convened to elect his successor were:

- Dietrich Schenk von Erbach, elector of Mainz
- Raban of Helmstatt, elector of Trier
- Dietrich II of Moers, elector of Cologne
- Louis IV, elector of the Electoral Palatinate
- Frederick II, elector of Saxony
- Frederick I, elector of Brandenburg

Albert, as king of Bohemia, was entitled to a vote. However, he was in Bohemia suppressing an uprising and was not present at the election.

== Elected ==
Albert was elected King of the Romans. He was never officially crowned emperor, due to him dying early.
