= 1051 German royal election =

Imperial election held in Tribur

- November 1051

Elected by the stem dukes and the nobility Consensus needed to win
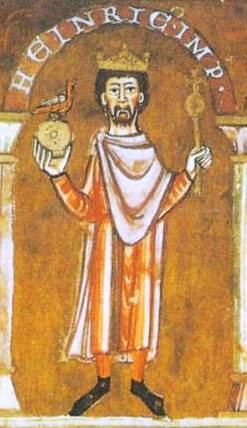
Candidate	Henry IV
Dynasty	Salian
Result	Elected
King before election
Henry III
Salian dynasty
Elected King (Note: Henry was elected as co-king at the age of one during the lifetime of his father, Henry III, to ensure a smooth dynastic succession.)
Henry IV
Salian dynasty

The 1051 German royal election was an imperial election held in November 1051 at Tribur. The assembly of princes elected the one-year-old Henry IV as co-king to his father, Henry III, to ensure the stability of the Salian dynasty's succession.

== Background ==
Henry III had fathered four daughters, but his subjects were convinced only a male heir could secure peace. While celebrating Christmas 1050 at Pöhlde in Saxony, Henry III designated his infant son as his successor.

== Election at Tribur ==
In November 1051, the Emperor held an assembly at Tribur. The German princes who attended the meeting elected the one-year-old king. They stipulated they would acknowledge him as his father's successor only if he acted as a "just ruler" during his father's lifetime. Historian Ian S. Robinson supposes the princes actually wanted to persuade Henry III to change his methods of government since the child king had no role in state administration.

== Coronation and aftermath ==
At Christmas 1052, the Emperor made Henry the duke of Bavaria. Archbishop Hermann crowned Henry King of Germany in Aachen on 17 July 1054.

== Bibliography ==
- Hill, Boyd H. (2020) [1972]. Medieval Monarchy in Action: The German Empire from Henry I to Henry IV. Routledge Library Editions: The Medieval World. Vol. 21. Routledge. ISBN 978-0-429-26124-4.
- Robinson, I. S. (2003) [1999]. Henry IV of Germany, 1056–1106. Cambridge University Press. ISBN 0-521-54590-0.
- Schutz, Herbert (2010). The Medieval Empire in Central Europe: Dynastic Continuity in the Post-Carolingian Frankish Realm, 900–1300. Cambridge Scholars Publishing. ISBN 978-1-4438-1966-4.
