= 1028 German royal election =

- 14 April 1028

Elected by the stem dukes and the nobility Consensus needed to win
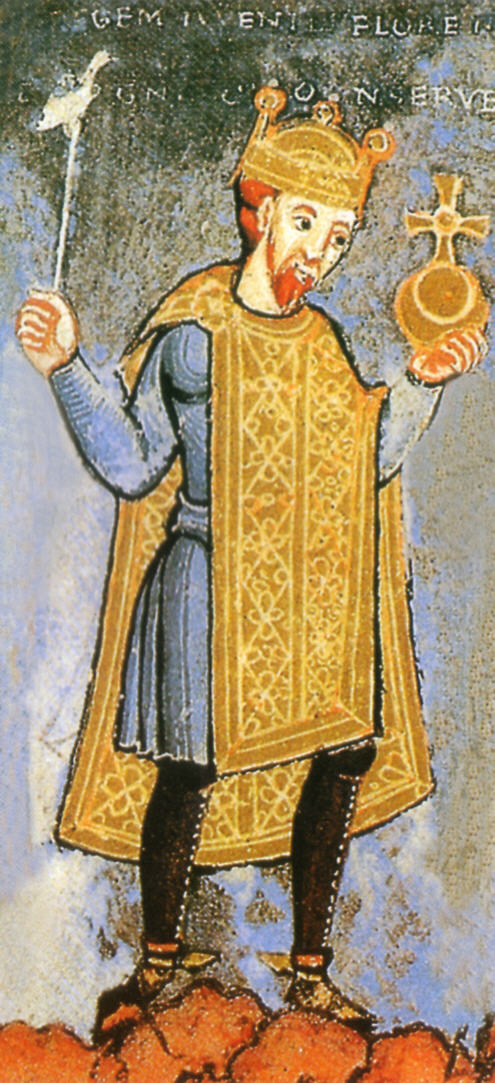
Candidate	Henry III
Dynasty	Salian
Result	Elected
King before election
Conrad II
Salian dynasty
Elected King (Note: Henry was elected as co-king during the lifetime of his father, Conrad II, to ensure a smooth dynastic succession.)
Henry III
Salian dynasty

The 1028 German royal election was an imperial election held on 14 April 1028 to select a co-ruler for the Holy Roman Empire. The election took place at the initiative of Conrad II to secure the succession for his son, Henry III.

== Background ==
Emperor Conrad II was determined to strengthen royal authority in Germany. Ignoring the claim of Emeric, the son of King Stephen I of Hungary, to Bavaria, Conrad persuaded the Bavarian aristocrats to acknowledge Henry as their duke in Regensburg on 24 July 1027. Henry's appointment to the duchy was unprecedented—Bavaria had never been ruled by a ten-year-old duke.

In autumn 1027, the Emperor sent Bishop Werner of Strasbourg to Constantinople to win a bride from the Byzantine imperial family for Henry, but Werner's sudden death put an end to the negotiations with Emperor Constantine VIII.

== Election and coronation ==
At Conrad's initiative, the "clergy and the people" elected Henry his co-ruler and Pilgrim, Archbishop of Cologne, crowned Henry king in Aachen on Easter 1028. Henry was thereafter named the "hope of the empire" on his father's seals in accordance with Byzantine customs.

== Aftermath ==
Conrad sent another embassy to Constantinople. Constantine VIII's successor, Emperor Romanos III Argyros, proposed the hand of one of his sisters to Henry, but Conrad's envoy, Count Manegold of Donauwörth, refused the offer since she was already married.

Following his election, Henry began to take an active role in the administration of the empire, specifically in negotiations with Stephen I of Hungary in 1031. He remained co-ruler until the death of Conrad II in 1039, at which point he succeeded him as king and imperator in spe.

== Bibliography ==
- Schutz, Herbert (2010). The Medieval Empire in Central Europe: Dynastic Continuity in the Post-Carolingian Frankish Realm, 900–1300. Cambridge Scholars Publishing. ISBN 978-1443819664.
- Weinfurter, Stefan (1999). The Salian Century: Main Currents in an Age of Transition. The Middle Ages. Translated by Bowlus, Barbara M. University of Pennsylvania Press. ISBN 0812235088.
- Wolfram, Herwig (2006). Conrad II, 990–1039: Emperor of Three Kingdoms. Translated by Kaiser, Denise A. The Pennsylvania State University Press. ISBN 027102738X.
