= 1571 Haverfordwest election =

An election for the Haverfordwest (Wales) seat in the House of Commons of England was held on 20 March 1571. Agents working for the local politician engaged in illegal voter interference, and the election result was challenged in court and overturned.

The most prominent local politician in Haverfordwest at the time was Sir John Perrot. He declined to stand due to his appointment to the office of Lord President of Munster. The supporters of Perrot nominated John Garnons, who had previously been MP for Pembroke. Alban Stepneth, a member of the local gentry,also put his name forward. Perrot's powerful supporters interfered with voters but still Stepneth received more votes than Garnons. However the local officials declared Garnons the winner. Stepneth appealed to the Star Chamber, and he was by its judgment declared to have won the election. The election is notable as one of the few Elizabethan contested elections of which the full records are extant.

== Context ==
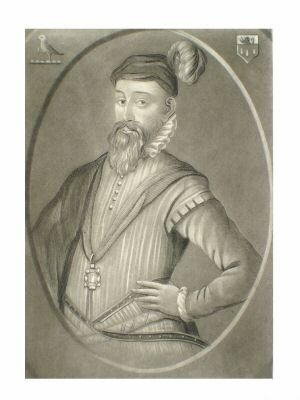
Portrait of Sir John Perrot - mezzotint after George Powle

Much of the English Parliament was filled by MPs elected in two-seat districts, but the voters in Wales were divided into single member districts, apparently in order to better ensure local "strong men" could dominate the elections. The polarized climate of the Haverfordwest election in 1571 is a reflection of the defensive stance taken by the old guard at that time.

During the late 16th century, Haverfordwest had a population of around two to three thousand, of which one hundred were burgesses, who bore the right to vote. The district was politically dominated by a few individuals, most notably Perrot, who was supported by the local gentry, and opposing him, the antiquarian George Owen of Henllys, and John Barlow of Slebech, who had come into conflict with Perrot due to a land dispute. Perrot himself had grown up in the area, his boyhood home being at Haroldstone, and he had been Mayor of Haverfordwest in 1570, an office which he also held in 1575 and 1576. Prior to the events of the 1571, Perrot held a virtual monopoly of power. His supporters held all the borough offices, including the mayor, John Voyle, and the sheriff, Edmund Harries.

The Perrot-friendly sheriff, Edmund Harries, acted as returning officer and thus was in position to influence the election result.

== Preparations for the election ==
Due to Perrot's position, his opponents were not prepared to stand a candidate against him nor a candidate endorsed by him. However, Perrot was appointed Lord President of Munster in November 1570, and was due to set sail to Ireland a month before the election was to take place. This essentially created a power vacuum.

The borough officials put forward John Garnons. Garnons was descended from a gentle family whose estates were originally in Hertfordshire, but he had married a woman from Pembrokeshire. He most likely had been appointed Clerk of the Peace for the county by Perrot, although the details are uncertain. He had previously represented the constituency of Pembroke in the 3rd parliament of Mary I, in 1554. It is known that he was excommunicate at the time of the election.

Alban Stepneth, a gentleman tied to the Prendergast family, stood in opposition to Garnons.

It appears that voter intimidation by the Perrotist faction took place. A tailor named William Morgan threatened supporters of Stepneth with violence if they voted for Stepneth, and the Mayor made several commoners who supported Perrot into burgesses simply to swing the election. One supporter of Stepneth who was at the time imprisoned as a burgess, and thus had many more liberties than a common prisoner, was transferred to the common prison when he let his voting intentions be known to the Sheriff.

== The electoral process ==
The election was held on 20 March at the Shire Hall. After the two candidates were nominated, two books were prepared, one for each candidate. Each voter present was individually called to sign the book of his choice. If it was suspected that a voter was not a burgess (and thus did not have the right to vote), they could be challenged, in which case they could declare on oath that they were a burgess. Harries attempted to manipulate the election by preventing several of Stepneth's supporters from entering the hall, Stepneth also claimed to the Star Chamber that Harries had intimidated voters within the building with threats and violence.

== Results ==
Despite the efforts of Harries, seven more burgesses signed Stepneth's book than Garnons' book. The Sheriff at this point committed election fraud by transferring two of Stepneth's voters to Garnons, and by gathering together several locals who were not burgesses to vote for Garnons. He thus returned Garnons as the MP despite the fact that he had polled fewer votes than Stepneth. The exact number of votes claimed to have been won by Garnon is not recorded, but it was presumably over Stepneth's fifty. Harries stated during the election that he would return Garnon no matter how large Stepneth's majority was.

Parliamentary election, 1571: Haverfordwest - notional results according to book count
Party	Candidate	Votes	%	±%
Perrotist	John Garnons	44	46.8	n/a
Anti-Perrotist	Alban Stepneth	50	53.2	n/a
Perrotist hold		Swing	n/a	
Turnout		94	94.0	n/a

Parliamentary election, 1571: Haverfordwest - notional results according to Stepneth's Star Chamber testimony
Party	Candidate	Votes	%	±%
Perrotist	John Garnons	30*	38.0	n/a
Anti-Perrotist	Alban Stepneth	49*	62.0	n/a
Perrotist hold		Swing	n/a	
Turnout		79	79.0	n/a

The second notional set of results reflects the fact that fourteen of those who voted for Garnon were not eligible voters, thirteen not being burgesses at the time. The fourteenth refused to take the oath. One of the men who voted for Stepneth was challenged, and it is possible that he may not have been a burgess.

== Aftermath ==
Stepneth challenged the return at the Star Chamber. He won his case, and Harries was imprisoned and fined £200 for the crime of the false return. Stepneth was elected to the seat uncontested in 1572. By the time the next election was held, in 1584, Perrot had been appointed Lord Lieutenant of Ireland, and therefore was again absent. Stepneth retained his seat at the 1586 election, but did not contest the November 1588 election in which Perrot was returned.
