= 1423 Venetian doge election =

1423 election of the Doge of Venice

- 15 April 1423

41 electors 25 votes needed to win
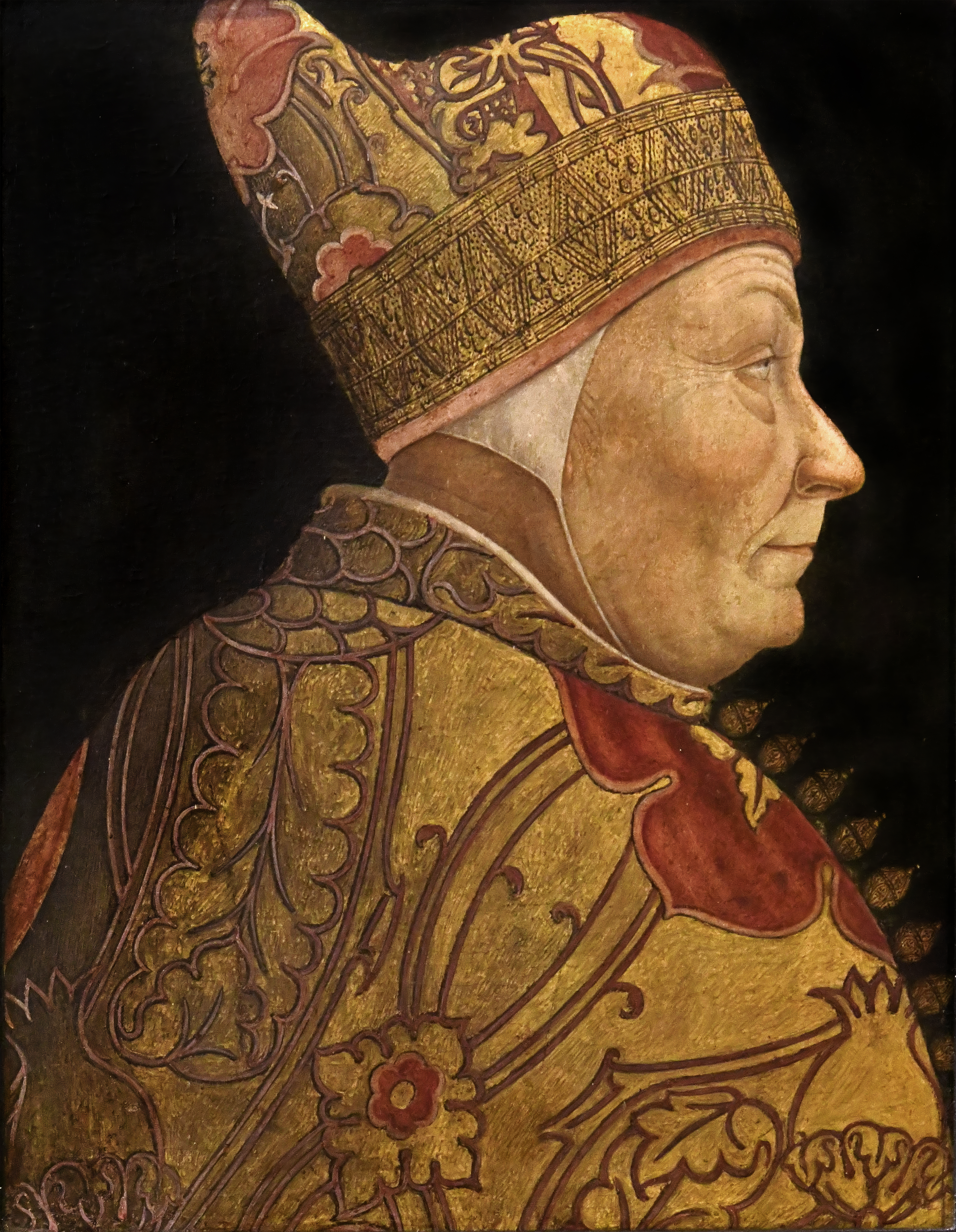
Candidate	Francesco Foscari	Others (Note: Pietro Loredan, Leonardo Mocenigo, Francesco Bembo, Antonio Contarini, and Marino Caravello.)
First ballot	11 (26.8%)	30 (73.2%)
Final ballot	26 (63.4%)	15 (36.6%)
Doge before election
Tommaso Mocenigo
Elected doge
Francesco Foscari

The 1423 Venetian doge election took place on 15 April 1423, to elect the new Doge of Venice following the death of Tommaso Mocenigo. The election resulted in the victory of Francesco Foscari over Pietro Loredan. Foscari would go on to serve as Doge for 34 years, marking the longest reign in Venetian history.

== Background ==
Prior to the election, Francesco Foscari had emerged as one of the leading statesmen of the Republic of Venice. A member of the patrician Foscari family, he served the republic in numerous official capacities, including ambassador, president of the Council of Forty, member of the Council of Ten, inquisitor, Procurator of St Mark's, and avogador de comùn.

By the time of Doge Tommaso Mocenigo's death in 1423, Foscari was widely regarded as one of the most influential figures in Venetian politics and a leading candidate for the dogeship.

== Election ==
Following the death of Doge Tommaso Mocenigo, the electoral assembly of 41 members convened to elect his successor. Foscari's chief competitor in the election was Pietro Loredan. On 15 April 1423, Francesco Foscari was elected Doge on the tenth ballot, securing 26 out of the 41 votes.

The 1423 election marked a significant constitutional shift: in proclaiming the new doge, the customary formula which recognized the people's share in the appointment and asked for their approval—the last vestige of popular government—was finally dropped.

=== Electors ===
The following 41 electors were selected to elect the new doge:

Electors
#	Elector
1	Leonardo Mocenigo, procurator
2	Caroso da Pesaro
3	Piero Loredan, procurator
4	Bernardo Pisani
5	Francesco Foscari, procurator
6	Marco da Molin, avogador
7	Zuan di Garzoni "the Great"
8	Marin Caravello, procurator
9	Antonio Contarini
10	Bartolomeo Barbarigo
11	Zuan Navager, avogador
12	Bartolomeo Donado, knight
13	Antonio Moro, procurator
14	Marco Bragadin
15	Bertucci Querini, procurator
16	Fantin Pizamano, knight
17	Andrea Priuli
18	Michel Trivisan, knight
19	Polo Tron
20	Bulgaro Vitturi "the Great"
21	Francesco Girardo
22	Andrea Barbaro
23	Giacomo Cabriel
24	Alban Badoer
25	Rosso Marin "the Great"
26	Piero Duodo "the Great"
27	Cristoforo Soranzo
28	Ruberto Morosini, knight
29	Francesco Bernardo, knight
30	Giacomo Venier, patron at the Arsenal
31	Marco Dandolo
32	Piero Minotto "the Great"
33	Marco Polani
34	Polo Orio, knight
35	Polo Correr, procurator
36	Zanotto Tagliapietra
37	Zuan Zane "the Great"
38	Andrea Zullian
39	Homobon Gritti
40	Bartolomeo Storlado, knight
41	Vettor Marcello, knight

=== Voting summary ===
Recorded ballot totals
Candidate	1st ballot		8th ballot		9th ballot		10th ballot	
Candidate	Votes	%	Votes	%	Votes	%	Votes	%
Francesco Foscari	11	26.8%	16	39.0%	12	29.3%	26	63.4%
Others	30	73.2%	25	61.0%	29	70.7%	15	36.6%

== Aftermath ==
Following his election, Foscari's task as doge was to lead Venice in a long and protracted series of wars against Milan, governed by the Visconti, who were attempting to dominate all of northern Italy.

In 1457, news of his son Jacopo's death caused Foscari to withdraw from his government duties, and in October, the Council of Ten forced him to abdicate. He was deposed from office on 27 October 1457 and died five days after. Pasquale Malipiero was elected as his successor.

== Sources ==
- Romano, Dennis (2007). The Likeness of Venice: A Life of Doge Francesco Foscari. Yale University Press. ISBN 978-0-300-11202-3.
- Villari, Luigi (1911). "Foscari, Francesco" . In Chisholm, Hugh (ed.). Encyclopædia Britannica. Vol. 10 (11th ed.). Cambridge University Press. p. 730.
- Sanudo, Marin (1999). Caracciolo Aricò, Angela (ed.). Le vite dei dogi, 1423–1474 (PDF). Vol. 1. Transcription by Chiara Frison. Venice: La Malcontenta.
