= 1073 papal election =

Election of Catholic Pope Gregory VII

Papal election 1073

Dates and location
- 22 April 1073; San Pietro in Vincoli, Rome

Elected pope
- Hildebrand of Sovana; Name taken: Gregory VII
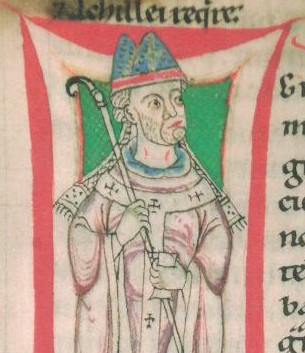

The 1073 papal election (held 22 April 1073) saw the election of Hildebrand of Sovana (who took the papal name Gregory VII) as successor to Pope Alexander II.

== Cardinal-electors ==
The papal bull "In nomine Domini" written by Pope Nicholas II in 1059, reformed the papal election process and only permitted cardinal-bishops to elect a new Pope, with the consent of minor clergy. In April 1073 there were four, the available data indicate that only two were present in Rome at the time of Alexander II's death:

- Giovanni (nominated 1057) - Cardinal-Bishop of Porto
- Ubaldo (nominated 1063) - Cardinal-Bishop of Sabina

=== Absent ===
Two cardinal bishops were absent, one of them was on a foreign legation, and the second was also a Benedictine abbot and not a resident of Rome:

- Gerald of Regensburg, (nominated 1072) - Cardinal-Bishop of Ostia, papal legate in France
- Peter Igneus, (nominated 1072) - Cardinal-Bishop of Albano, abbot of S. Salvatore in Fucecchio

== Death of Alexander II and the election of Gregory VII ==
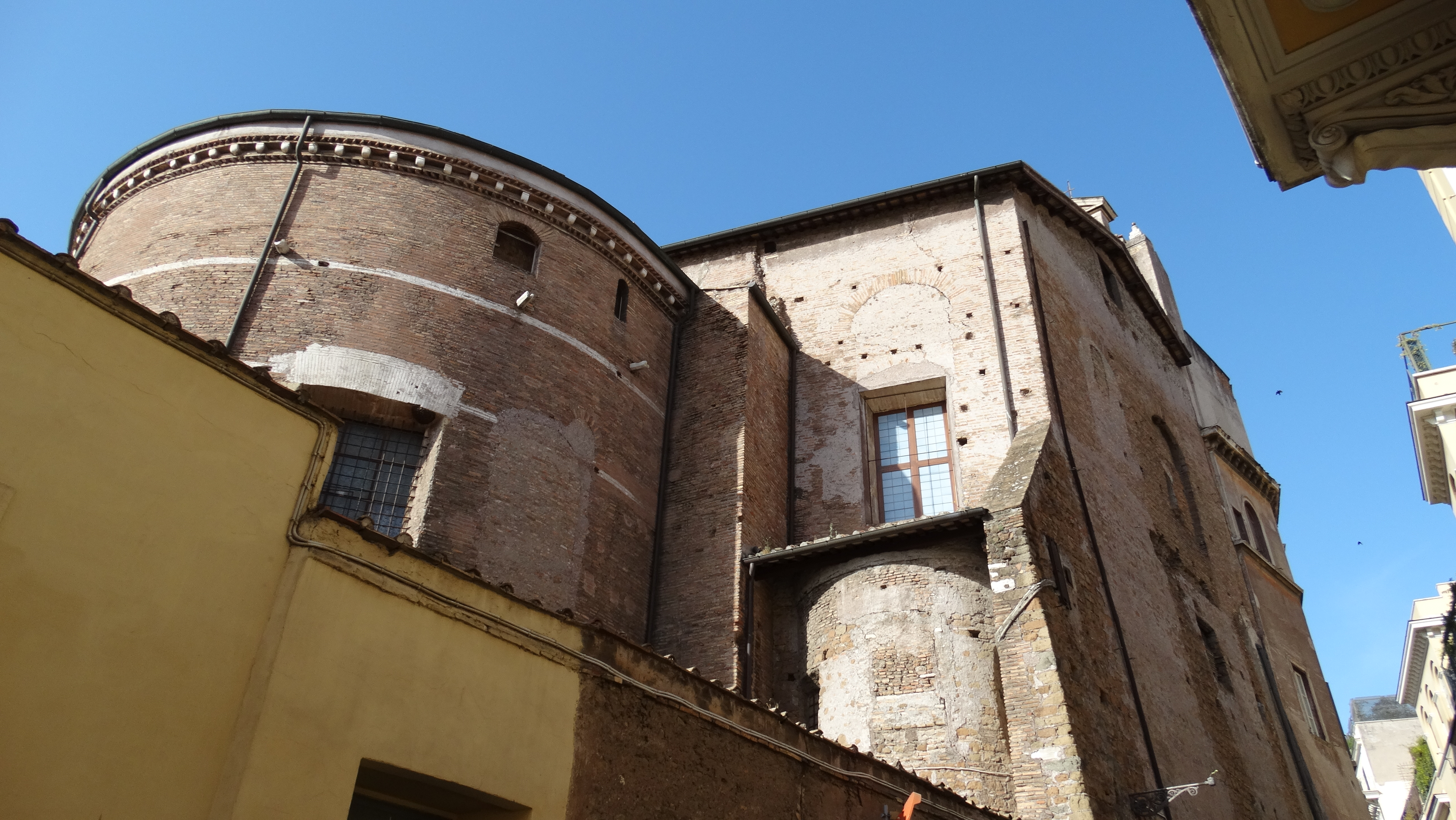
External brick walls of the apse of San Pietro in Vincoli. This is one of the oldest parts of the church and would have looked similar in the 11th century to how it looks today.

The day after the death of Alexander II which was on 21 April 1073, as the obsequies were being performed in the Lateran Basilica, there arose a loud outcry from the clergy and people: "Let Hildebrand be pope!", "Blessed Peter has chosen Hildebrand the Archdeacon!" Later, on the same day, Hildebrand was conducted to the Church of Saint Peter in Chains and elected Pope there in legal form by the assembled cardinals, with the due consent of the Roman clergy, amid the repeated acclamations of the people. Bonizo of Sutri places the funeral and election on 22 April.

It was debated at the time – and remains debated by historians – whether this extraordinary outburst in favor of Hildebrand by clergy and people was wholly spontaneous or could have been the result of some pre-concerted arrangements. Certainly, the mode of his election was highly criticized by his opponents. Many of the charges brought may have been expressions of personal dislike, liable to suspicion from the very fact that they were not raised to attack his promotion until several years later; but it is clear from his own account of the circumstances of his election that it was conducted in a very irregular fashion, and that the forms prescribed by the law of 1059 were not observed. Above all, the requirement of Pope Nicholas II that the Holy Roman Emperor be consulted in the matter was ignored. However, what ultimately turned the tide in favor of validity of Gregory's election was the near universal acclaim of the Roman people. In this sense, his election hearkened back to the earliest centuries of the Church of Rome, regardless of later canonical legislation.

Gregory's earliest pontifical letters clearly acknowledge this fact, and thus helped defuse any doubt about his election as immensely popular. On 22 May 1073 he received priestly ordination, and became pope on 30 June when he was ordained a bishop. In the decree of election, those who had chosen him as Bishop of Rome proclaimed Gregory VII “a devout man, a man mighty in human and divine knowledge, a distinguished lover of equity and justice, a man firm in adversity and temperate in prosperity, a man, according to the saying of the Apostle, of good behavior, blameless, modest, sober, chaste, given to hospitality, and one that ruleth well his own house; a man from his childhood generously brought up in the bosom of this Mother Church, and for the merit of his life already raised to the archidiaconal dignity”. “We choose then”, they said to the people, “our Archdeacon Hildebrand to be pope and successor to the Apostle, and to bear henceforward and forever the name of Gregory” (22 April 1073).

Gregory's first attempts in foreign policy were towards a reconciliation with the Normans of Robert Guiscard; in the end the two parties did not meet. After a failed call for a crusade to the princes of northern Europe, and after obtaining the support of other Norman princes such as Landulf VI of Benevento and Richard I of Capua, Gregory was able to excommunicate Robert in 1074. In the same year Gregory summoned a council in the Lateran palace, which condemned simony and confirmed celibacy for the Church's clergy. These decrees were further stressed, under menace of excommunication, the next year (24–28 February). In particular, Gregory decreed in this second council that only the Pope could appoint or depose bishops or move them from see to see, an act which was later to cause the Investiture Controversy.
