= 1376 imperial election =

Election for Holy Roman Emperor

- 10 June 1376

7 Prince-electors 4 votes needed to win
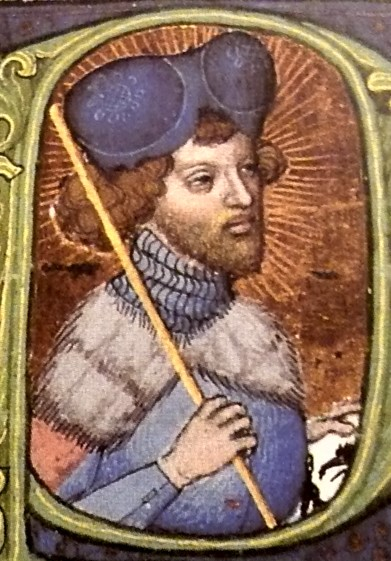
| Candidate | Wenceslaus |
| House | Luxembourg |
| Electoral vote | 7 |
| Percentage | 100% |
King before election
Charles IV
Luxembourg
Elected King
Wenceslaus
Luxembourg

The imperial election of 1376 was an imperial election held to select the emperor of the Holy Roman Empire. It took place in Frankfurt on 10 June.

== Background ==
This was the first imperial election following the enactment of the Golden Bull of 1356, which laid out in exact terms the qualifications of the electors and the manner of holding elections. Charles IV, Holy Roman Emperor called for the election of his son Wenceslaus IV of Bohemia. The former, as king of Bohemia, and the latter, as margrave of Brandenburg, were entitled to two of the seven votes. The remaining prince-electors were:

- Louis of Meissen, elector of Mainz
- Kuno II von Falkenstein, elector of Trier
- Frederick III of Saarwerden, elector of Cologne
- Rupert I, elector of the Electoral Palatinate
- Wenceslaus I, Duke of Saxe-Wittenberg, elector of Saxony

== Elected ==
Wenceslaus IV was duly elected. He succeeded his father as Holy Roman Emperor and king of Bohemia on the latter's death on November 29, 1378.
