= Quintus Asconius Pedianus =

Roman historian (BC 9 - AD 76)

Quintus Asconius Pedianus (9 BC – AD 76) was a Roman rhetorician from Patavium. There is no evidence that Asconius engaged in a public career, but his familiarity with the politics and geography of contemporary Rome suggests that he may have written much of his works in the city. He was likely born into an equestrian family; his familiarity with senatorial procedure also suggests membership in the Roman Senate.

During the reigns of Claudius and Nero he compiled historical commentaries on Cicero's speeches for his two sons, employing various sources: the Acta Diurna, shorthand reports or skeletons (commentarii) of Cicero's unpublished speeches, Tiro's life of Cicero, and speeches, letters and histories written during or shortly after Cicero's times, by such authors as Varro, Atticus, Antias, Tuditanus and Fenestella (a contemporary of Livy whom he often criticizes). Only five commentaries survive, relating to in Pisonem, pro Scauro, pro Milone, pro Cornelio de maiestate, and in toga candida. The commentary on pro Scauro can be approximately dated, since Pedianus speaks of Longus Caecina (died AD 57) as still living, and implies that Claudius (died AD 54) is deceased. These valuable notes, written in good Latin, relate chiefly to historical and antiquarian matters. A grammatical commentary on Cicero's Verrines was transmitted alongside Asconius' main commentaries but has been shown to be a 5th-century work.

Other works attributed to Asconius include a Vita Sallustii (biography of Sallust) referenced in Pliny's Naturalis Historiae, contra Vergilii obtrectatores (a defence of Virgil against his detractors), and a treatise on health and long life, perhaps a symposium in imitation of Plato.

The works on Sallust and Virgil were found by Poggio in a manuscript at St Gallen in 1416. This manuscript is lost, but three transcripts were made by Poggio, Zomini (Sozomenus) of Pistoia and Bartolommeo da Montepulciano. That of Poggio is now at Madrid (Matritensis X. 81), and that of Zomini is in the Forteguerri library at Pistoia (No. 37). A copy of Bartolommeo's transcript exists in Florence (Laur. 5). The later manuscripts are derived from Poggio's copy.

== Editions ==
- Kiessling and Scholl (1875)
- Albert Curtis Clark (Oxford, 1907), contains a previously unpublished collation of Poggio's manuscript.
- Asconius online on Attalus.org
