= 1075 German royal election =

- 25 December 1075

Elected by the stem dukes and the nobility Consensus needed to win
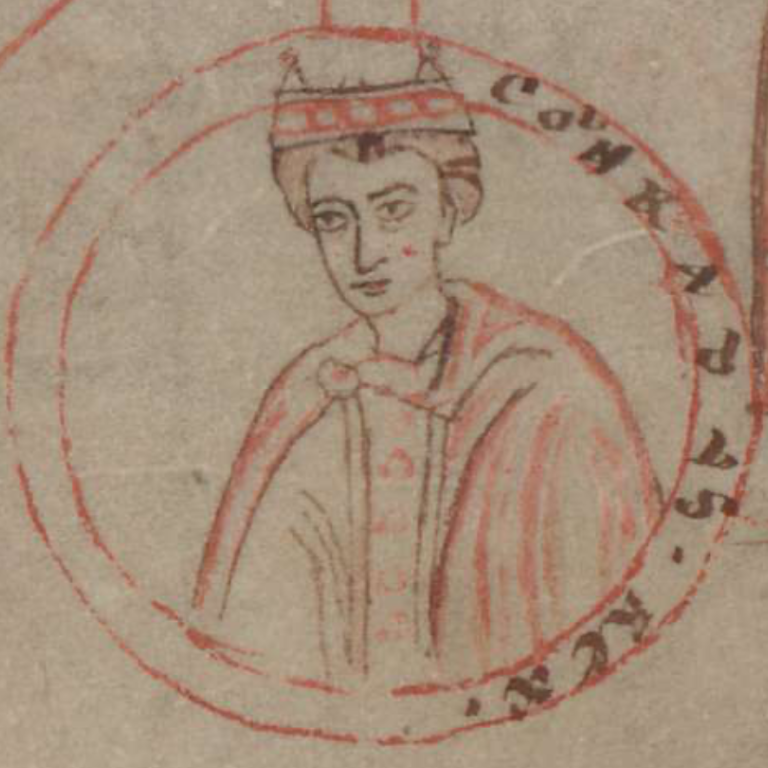
Candidate	Conrad II
Dynasty	Salian
Result	Elected
King before election
Henry IV
Salian dynasty
Elected King (Note: Conrad was elected as co-king at the age of one during the lifetime of his father, Henry IV, to ensure a smooth dynastic succession.)
Conrad II
Salian dynasty

The 1075 German royal election was a royal assembly held on Christmas Day, 25 December 1075, at Goslar. Organized by Henry IV following his victory in the Saxon rebellion, the assembly was intended to secure the royal succession for his one-year-old son, Conrad II.

== Background ==
Conrad was born on 12 February 1074 at Hersfeld Abbey while his father was fighting against the Saxon rebellion. He was baptised in the abbey three days later.

== Election at Goslar ==
After Henry's victory against the Saxons, he arranged for an assembly at Goslar on Christmas Day 1075 to swear an oath recognising Conrad as his successor.

== Aftermath and coronation ==
After the death of Duke Godfrey IV of Lower Lorraine on 22 February 1076, Henry refused to appoint the late duke's own choice of successor, his nephew, Godfrey of Bouillon, and instead named his two-year-old son Duke of Lower Lorraine. He did appoint Albert III of Namur, the deceased duke's brother-in-law, as his son's vice-duke (vicedux) to perform the daily functions of government. He also allowed the march of Antwerp to pass to Godfrey of Bouillon. The total absence of Conrad from his duchy caused or abetted the decline of ducal authority in it. In 1082, while Conrad was in Italy, the peace of God was introduced into the diocese of Liège.

Conrad subscribed to his first royal charter in 1079.

In December 1080, the Saxon lords who had supported the kingship of the late Rudolf of Swabia against Henry gathered "to discuss the state of their kingdom [Saxony]" in Bruno of Merseburg's words. Henry sent envoys to the Saxons asking them to accept his son Conrad as their king, and in exchange he promised never to enter Saxony. (Conrad was apparently back in Germany.) Otto of Northeim, speaking for the Saxons, "desired neither the son nor the father" since he had "often seen a bad calf begotten by a bad ox."

In 1087, Conrad returned to Germany. On 30 May, he was crowned king in Aachen by Archbishop Sigewin of Cologne. The ceremony was attended by Albert of Namur, Godfrey of Bouillon and Duke Magnus of Saxony, according to the Annales Weissenburgenses. The last reference to Conrad as duke of Lower Lotharingia (dux Lothariorum) comes from a charter issued at Aachen shortly before his coronation, after which Henry appointed Godfrey of Bouillon duke in his place.

== Bibliography ==
- Gawlik, Alfred (1980). "Konrad (deutscher König)". Neue Deutsche Biographie (in German). Vol. 12. Berlin: Duncker & Humblot. pp. 496–496. (.html full text online).
- Lindner, Theodor (1882). "Konrad" . Allgemeine Deutsche Biographie (in German). Vol. 16. Leipzig: Duncker & Humblot. pp. 554–556.
- Robinson, Ian S. (2000). Henry IV of Germany. New York: Cambridge University Press.
