= 911 German royal election =

- 10 November 911

Elected by the stem dukes and the nobility Consensus needed to win
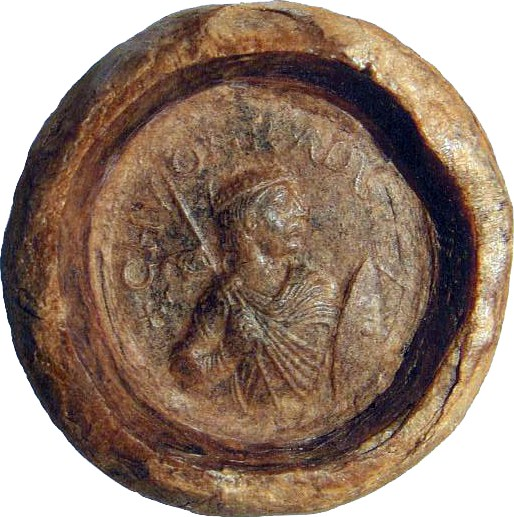
Candidate	Conrad I
Dynasty	Conradines
Result	Elected
King before election
Louis the Child
Carolingian dynasty
Elected King
Conrad I
Conradines

The 911 German royal election was an assembly held on 10 November 911 at Forchheim to determine the successor to King Louis the Child, the last Carolingian ruler of East Francia. The rulers of the East Frankish stem duchies rejected the hereditary claims of the West Frankish Carolingian king Charles the Simple. Instead, they elected Conrad I, Duke of Franconia. This marked the end of Carolingian rule in East Francia and established a precedent for elective kingship, making Conrad the first non-Carolingian king chosen by the German nobility.

== Background ==
Conrad was the son of duke Conrad of Thuringia (called the Elder) and his wife Glismoda, probably related to Ota, wife of the Carolingian emperor Arnulf of Carinthia and mother of Louis the Child. The Conradines, counts in the Franconian Lahngau region, had been loyal supporters of the Carolingians. At the same time, they competed vigorously for predominance in Franconia with the sons of the Babenbergian duke Henry of Franconia at Bamberg Castle. In 906 the two parties battled each other near Fritzlar. Conrad the Elder was killed, as were two of the three Babenberg brothers. King Louis the Child then took the Conradines' side and the third Babenbergian brother Adalbert was arrested and executed shortly thereafter, despite a promise of safe conduct by the king's chancellor, Archbishop Hatto I of Mainz. Conrad then became the undisputed duke of all Franconia. Nevertheless, he failed in his attempts to extend the rule of Conradines over western Lotharingia after the death of his uncle, duke Gebhard.

== Election at Forchheim ==
After the death of Louis the Child, Conrad was elected king of East Francia on 10 November 911 at Forchheim by the rulers of Saxony, Swabia and Bavaria. The dukes prevented the succession to the throne of Louis' Carolingian relative Charles the Simple, king of West Francia. They chose the Conradine scion, who was maternally related to the late king. Only Conrad's rival, Reginar, duke of Lotharingia, refused to give him his allegiance and joined West Francia.

== Reign and aftermath ==
Exactly because Conrad I was one of the dukes, he found it very hard to establish his authority over them. Duke Henry of Saxony was in rebellion against Conrad I until 915 and the struggle against Arnulf, Duke of Bavaria, cost Conrad I his life. Burchard II, Duke of Swabia, demanded and received more autonomy. Arnulf of Bavaria called on Magyars for assistance in his uprising, and when defeated, fled to Magyar lands. For this he was condemned to death as a traitor, but the powerful duke managed to avoid execution.

In 913 Conrad I married Cunigunde, widow of Liutpold and sister of the Swabian count Erchanger. They had: Cunigunda and Herman, both born in 913.

In 913 Erchanger revolted against Conrad I, and in 914 he captured Solomon III, Bishop of Constance, who was Conrad’s chief counselor. Erchanger was exiled but still managed to defeat the royal army in a battle near Lake Constance. He was finally arrested for treason in an assembly of nobles at Hohenaltheim in Swabia and on 21 January 917 was executed together with his brother Berthold.

Conrad's reign was a continuous and generally unsuccessful struggle to uphold the power of the king against the growing power of the local dukes. His military campaigns against Charles the Simple to regain Lotharingia and the Imperial city of Aachen were failures. Archbishop Ratbod of Trier even became West Frankish chancellor in 913. Conrad's realm was also exposed to the continuous raids of the Magyars since the disastrous defeat of the Bavarian forces at the 907 Battle of Pressburg, leading to a considerable decline in his authority. His attempt to mobilize the East Frankish episcopate led by Archbishop Unni of Bremen to his cause at the 916 synod of Hohenaltheim was not enough to compensate other failures. After several clashes, Conrad at least was able to come to terms with duke Henry of Saxony. The restless Swabian dukes Erchanger (executed in 917) and Burchard II were a continuous threat, as was Arnulf, Duke of Bavaria.

Severely injured at one of his battles with Arnulf, Conrad died on 23 December 918 at his residence in Weilburg Castle. He was buried in Fulda Cathedral.

== Succession ==
According to the Res gestae saxonicae by the chronicler Widukind of Corvey, Conrad on his deathbed persuaded his younger brother Eberhard of Franconia to offer the royal crown to Henry the Fowler, the duke of Saxony and one of his principal opponents, since he considered Henry to be the only duke capable of holding the kingdom together in the face of internal rivalries among the dukes and the continuous Magyar raids. It was not until May 919 when Eberhard and the other Frankish nobles accepted Conrad's advice, and Henry was elected king at the Reichstag of Fritzlar.

== Bibliography ==
- Bachrach, David S. (2012). Warfare in Tenth-Century Germany. The Boydell Press.
- Bernhardt, John W. (1996). Itinerant Kingship and Royal Monasteries in Early Medieval Germany, C.936-1075 (2nd ed.). Cambridge University Press.
- Dick, Madelyn Bergen (2001). "Conrad I". In Jeep, John M. (ed.). Medieval Germany: An Encyclopedia. Garland Publishing. p. 141-142.
- Duckett, Eleanor Shipley (1988). Death and Life in the Tenth Century. The University of Michigan Press.
- Müller-Mertens, Eckhard (1999). "The Ottonians as Kings and Emperors". In Reuter, Timothy (ed.). The New Cambridge Medieval History, Volume 3: c.900 – c.1024. Cambridge University Press. pp. 233–266.
- Reuter, Timothy (1991). Germany in the Early Middle Ages, c. 800–1056. London: Longman.
- Thompson, James Westfall (1918). Church and State in Mediaeval Germany. The American Journal of Theology.
