= Andrew Lintott =

British classical scholar (born 1936)

Andrew William Lintott (born 9 December 1936) is a British classical scholar who specialises in the political and administrative history of ancient Rome, Roman law and epigraphy. He is an emeritus fellow of Worcester College, University of Oxford.

== Biography ==
From 1958 to 1960, Lintott was a second lieutenant in the Royal Artillery. After leaving the service, he was an assistant lecturer then lecturer in classics at King's College London from 1960 to 1967. He was lecturer then senior lecturer in ancient history at the University of Aberdeen (1967–81), and a fellow and tutor in ancient history at Worcester College Oxford (1981–2004), where he became a reader in 1996 and a professor in 1999.

In 1990, Lintott was a visiting member of the Institute for Advanced Study at Princeton. He was a Hugh Last fellow at the British School at Rome in 1994, and a visiting professor at the University of Texas at Austin in 2002.

Lintott edited and contributed to the Cambridge Ancient History series, to both volume 9, which he edited with J.A. Crook and Elizabeth Rawson, and volume 10, for which his coeditors were Alan Bowman and Edward Champlin.

== Selected publications ==
- Violence in Republican Rome (Oxford University Press, 1968, 2nd edition 1999).
- Violence, Civil Strife and Revolution in the Classical City (Johns Hopkins University Press, 1982, reprinted 1987).
- Judicial Reform and Land Reform in the Roman Republic (Cambridge University Press, 1992).
- Cambridge Ancient History: The Last Age of the Roman Republic, 146–43 b.c. (Cambridge University Press, 1992), vol. 9, coedited with J. A. Crook and Elizabeth Rawson; contributed "The Crisis of the Republic: Sources and Source-problems," "The Roman Empire and Its Problems in the Late Second Century," "Political History, 146–95 b.c.," "Epilogue: The fall of the Roman Republic."
- Imperium Romanum: Politics and Administration (Routledge, 1993).
- Cambridge Ancient History: The Augustan Empire, 43 B.C–A.D. 69 (Cambridge University Press, 1996), vol. 10, coedited with Alan K. Bowman and Edward Champlin.
- "Cassius Dio and the History of the Late Roman Republic," Aufstieg und Niedergang der römischen Welt II.34.3 (1997), 2497–2523.
- The Constitution of the Roman Republic (Oxford University Press, 1999).
- The Roman Republic (Sutton, 2000).
- "Aristotle and the Mixed Constitution," in Alternatives to Athens: Varieties of Political Organization and Community in Ancient Greece, edited by R. Brock and S. Hodkinson (Oxford 2000), 152–66.
- Cicero as Evidence: A Historian's Companion (Oxford University Press, 2008).
- The Romans in the Age of Augustus (Blackwell, 2010).
