= Lucius Cassius Longinus (praetor 66 BC) =

Roman politician

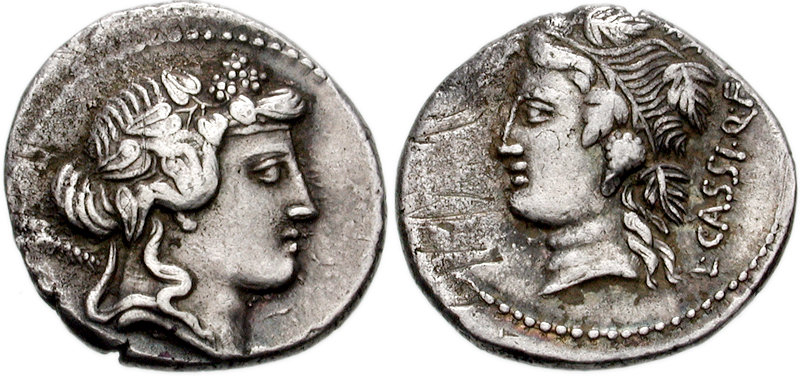
Coin minted in 78 BC by Lucius Cassius, son of Quintus (L CASSI Q F), depicting Libera (left) and Bacchus (right)

Lucius Cassius Longinus (c. 106 – after 63 BC) was a Roman politician and a participant in the conspiracy of Catilina.

He is probably identical with the moneyer Lucius Cassius, son of Quintus, who minted coins in 78 BC. He was probably already a senator in 74 BC, when he is found as a juror in the trial of Oppianicus. In 70 BC, he was a juror in the trial of Gaius Verres, and was elected military tribune for the following year. As praetor in 66 BC, Longinus prevented the trial of an unruly tribune of the previous year, Gaius Cornelius, from taking place.

Longinus unsuccessfully ran for the consulship of 63 BC, the same year as Cicero. He then joined the conspiracy of Lucius Sergius Catilina, another failed candidate, to overthrow the government. Longinus conducted secret negotiations with the Allobroges, and was entrusted with setting fire to the city on the outbreak of the conspiracy. However, he seems to have suspected that the Allobroges were informants, and fled the city before the arrest and execution of his fellow conspirators. After the conspiracy was exposed, he was ordered arrested and, if caught, executed. His fate, however, is unknown, as there is no mention of him after this point. It is possible that he died with Catilina at Pistoria.
