= Nobiles =

Social rank of ancient Rome

The nobiles (sg. nobilis, transl. 'noble', 'noteworthy') were members of a social rank in the Roman Republic indicating that one was "well known". This may have changed over time: in Cicero's time, one was notable if one descended from a person who had been elected consul. In earlier periods and more broadly, this may have included a larger group consisting of those who were patricians, were descended from patricians who had become plebeians via transitio ad plebem, or were descended from plebeians who had held curule offices.

== History ==
The nobiles emerged after the Conflict of the Orders established legal equality between patricians and plebeians, allowing plebeians to hold all the magistracies; the state of being "known" was connected to the nobiles's rights to funeral masks (Latin: imagines) and actors in aristocratic funeral processions. However, the term is largely unattested to in the middle Republic, having been introduced in the late Republic as a description rather than a status. Earning such a mask required holding one of the qualifying curule magistracies.

These elections meant the republican nobility was not entirely closed. Nor in the republic did nobiles enjoy special legal privileges. In the later Republic, one who became noble was termed a novus homo (English: new man), an unusual achievement. Two of the most famous examples of these self-made "new men" were Gaius Marius, who held the consulship seven times, and Cicero. While wholly new men were rare, the political elite as a whole turned over as some families were unable to win elections over multiple generations and other families became more prominent, creating slow-moving and osmotic change.

The prestige of the nobiles was connected directly to their election to high office by the people. During the Roman Republic, the nobiles never held less than about 70 per cent of the consulships over longer periods; by the time of Cicero, the nobiles as a whole held more than 90 per cent of the consulships, a proportion "remarkably untouched by the most violent political crises". The narrowing of what made someone part of the nobiles occurred around the time of the constitutional reforms of Sulla with its "much larger senate with a proportionately smaller circle of elite senators... many new Italians in the Sullan senate, and the increased number of praetors" leading the elite to close ranks to preserve their prestige.

During the time of Augustus, a nobilis enjoyed easier access to the consulship, with a lowered age requirement perhaps set at 32. Women who descended from Augustan consuls were also regarded as belonging to the Roman nobility. The term still referred to descendants of republican and triumviral consuls, but by the Antonines, most noble families had died out; one of the last were the Acilii Glabriones who survived into the 4th century.

== See also ==
- Cursus honorum
