= Imperial election =

Election of a Holy Roman Emperor

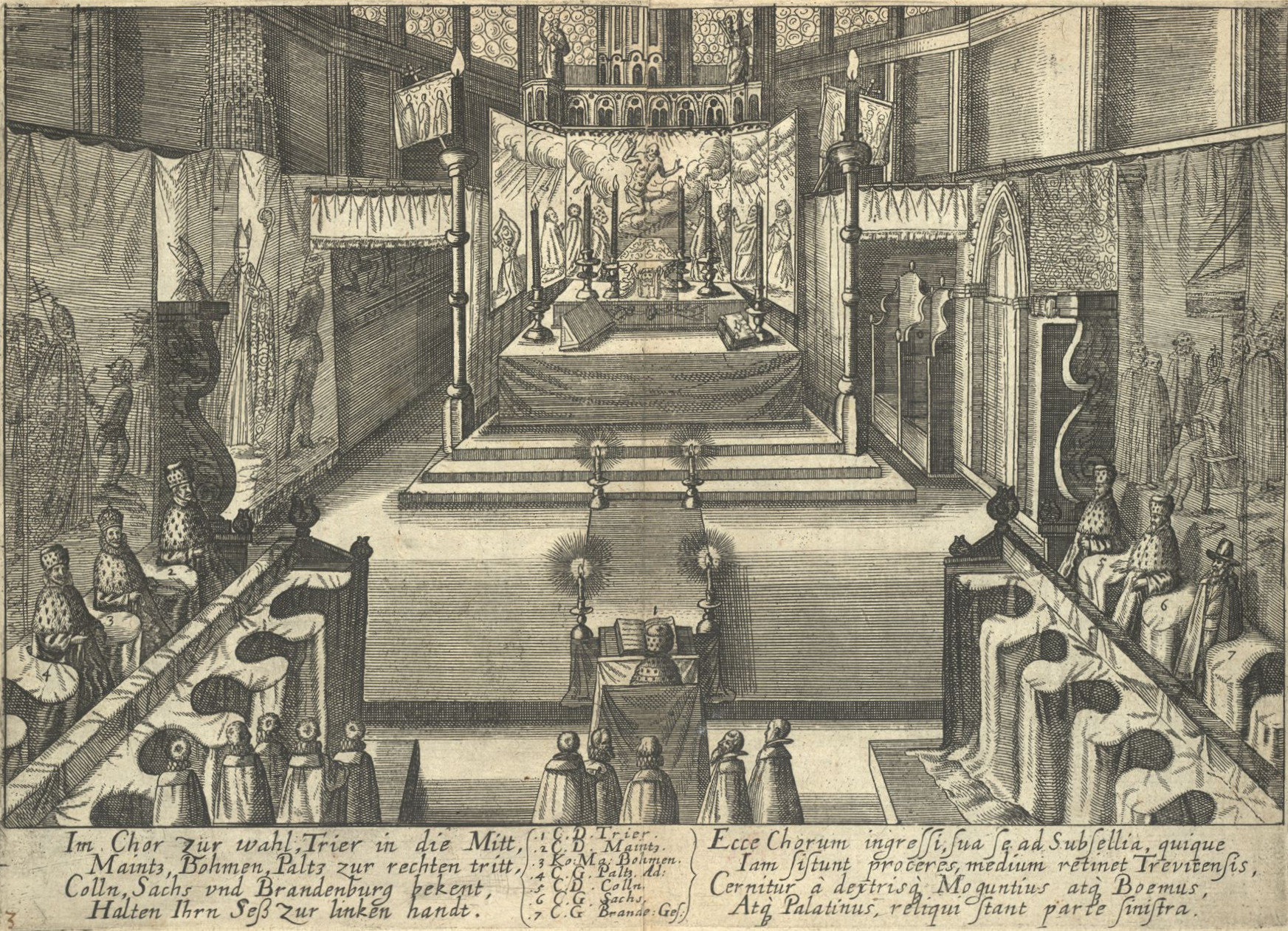
The election of Matthias as Roman-German Emperor by the prince electors in 1612 depicted on a contemporary engraving

The election of a Holy Roman Emperor was generally a two-stage process whereby the King of the Romans was elected by a small body of the greatest princes of the realm, the prince-electors. This was then followed shortly thereafter by his coronation as king, originally at Aachen and later at Frankfurt. The king was then expected to march to Rome, to be crowned Emperor by the pope. In 1356, the Emperor Charles IV promulgated the Golden Bull, which became the fundamental law by which all future kings and emperors were elected. After 1508, rulers usually were recognized as "Emperor elect" after their first, royal coronation.

== Background ==
The Königswahl was the election of royal candidates in the Holy Roman Empire and its predecessors as king by a specified elective body. Whilst the succession to the throne of the monarch in some cultures is governed by the rules of hereditary succession, there are also elective monarchies.

There were elective monarchies in several Germanic successor states after the collapse of the Roman Empire during the Migration Period, the Early Middle Ages, the Holy Roman Empire and the Kingdom of Poland from 1573 to 1795 (see Royal elections in Poland).

== Prince-electors ==
From the 13th century, the right to elect kings in the Holy Roman Empire came upon a limited number of imperial princes called prince-electors. There are various theories over the emergence of their exclusive election right.

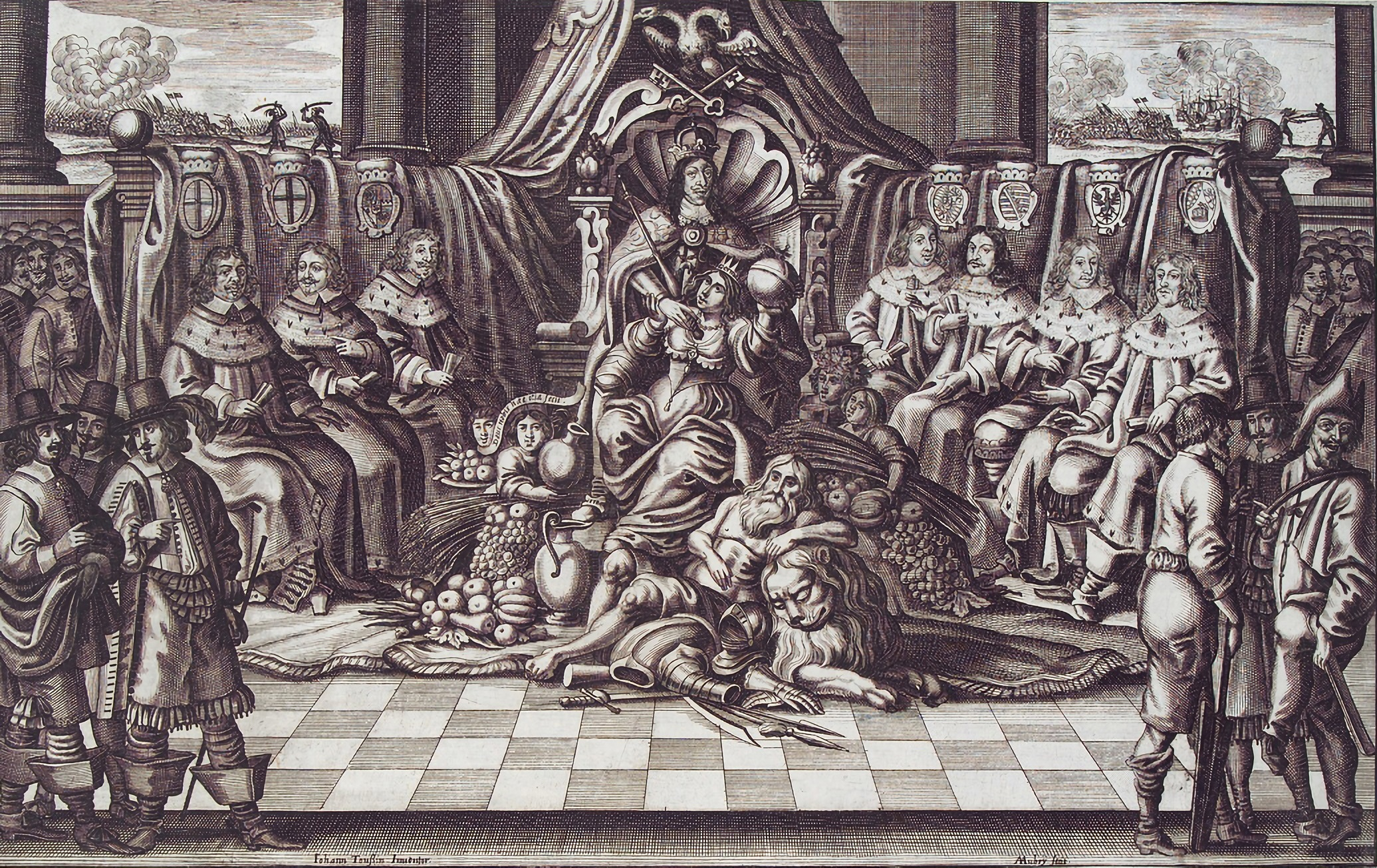
The Emperor and the eight electors (of Trier, Cologne, Mainz, Bohemia, Bavaria, Saxony, Brandenburg and the Electorate of the Palatinate). Copper engraving by Abraham Aubry, Nuremberg, 1663/64.

The secular electoral seats were hereditary. However, ecclesiastical electors (and other prince-bishops) were elected by the cathedral chapters as religious leaders, but simultaneously ruled as princes of a territory of imperial immediacy (which usually comprised a part of their diocesan territory). Thus the prince-bishoprics were elective monarchies too. The same holds true for prince-abbeys, whose prince-abbots or prince-abbesses were elected by a college of clerics and imperially appointed as princely rulers in a pertaining territory.

Initially seven electors chose the "King of the Romans". The king then went on to be crowned by the pope. The prince-electors were:

=== Ecclesiastical electors ===
- Prince-Archbishop of Mainz
- Prince-Archbishop of Cologne
- Prince-Archbishop of Trier

=== Secular electors ===
- King of Bohemia, of the House of Luxembourg at the time of the Golden Bull, but from 1526 onward ruled by the House of Habsburg, who also ruled the Archduchy of Austria and Inner Austria. The Bohemian Crown itself was also theoretically elective, but under the Habsburgs it became de facto hereditary.
- Count Palatine of the Rhine, throughout the entire period a member of the House of Wittelsbach. It lost its electoral status to Bavaria in 1623 due to the Thirty Years War. It regained electoral status in 1648 at the Peace of Westphalia as the eighth elector.
- Duke of Saxony, from 1356 a member of the House of Ascania; from 1423, a member of the House of Wettin
- Margrave of Brandenburg, from 1356 a member of the House of Wittelsbach; from 1373, a member of the House of Luxembourg; from 1415, a member of the House of Hohenzollern.

=== Subsequent changes ===
Later additions to the electoral council were:

- Duke of Bavaria; of another branch of the House of Wittelsbach, granted elector status in 1623, replacing the Count Palatinate of the Rhine following the Bohemian Revolt.
- Duke of Brunswick-Lüneburg (also known as the Elector of Hanover) of the House of Welf, granted elector status in 1692. From 1714 the Duke was also the King of Great Britain and King of Ireland.

== See also ==
- Coronation of the Holy Roman Emperor
- List of imperial elections in the Holy Roman Empire

== Literature ==
- Heinrich Mitteis: Die deutsche Königswahl. Ihre Rechtsgrundlagen bis zur Goldenen Bulle. 2. erweiterte Auflage. Rohrer, Brünn u. a. 1944.
- Eduard Hlawitschka: Königswahl und Thronfolge in fränkisch-karolingischer Zeit, Wissenschaftliche Buchgesellschaft, Darmstadt, 1975, ISBN 3-534-04685-4.
- Ulrich Schmidt: Königswahl und Thronfolge im 12. Jahrhundert. Böhlau, Cologne, etc.. 1987, ISBN 3-412-04087-8, (Forschungen zur Kaiser- und Papstgeschichte des Mittelalters. Beihefte zu J. F. Böhmer, Regesta Imperii 7), (Zugleich: Tübingen, Univ., Diss., 1985).
- Gerhard Baaken, Roderich Schmidt: Königtum, Burgen und Königsfreie. Königsumritt und Huldigungen in ottonisch-salischer Zeit. 2nd edn. Thorbecke, Sigmaringen, 1981, ISBN 3-799-56606-6 (Konstanzer Arbeitskreis für mittelalterliche Geschichte e.V. (publ.): Vorträge und Forschungen 6).
