= Porta Magna =

Land Gate of the Venetian Arsenal
- Porta da tera
- Part of Venetian Arsenal
- Venice in Italy
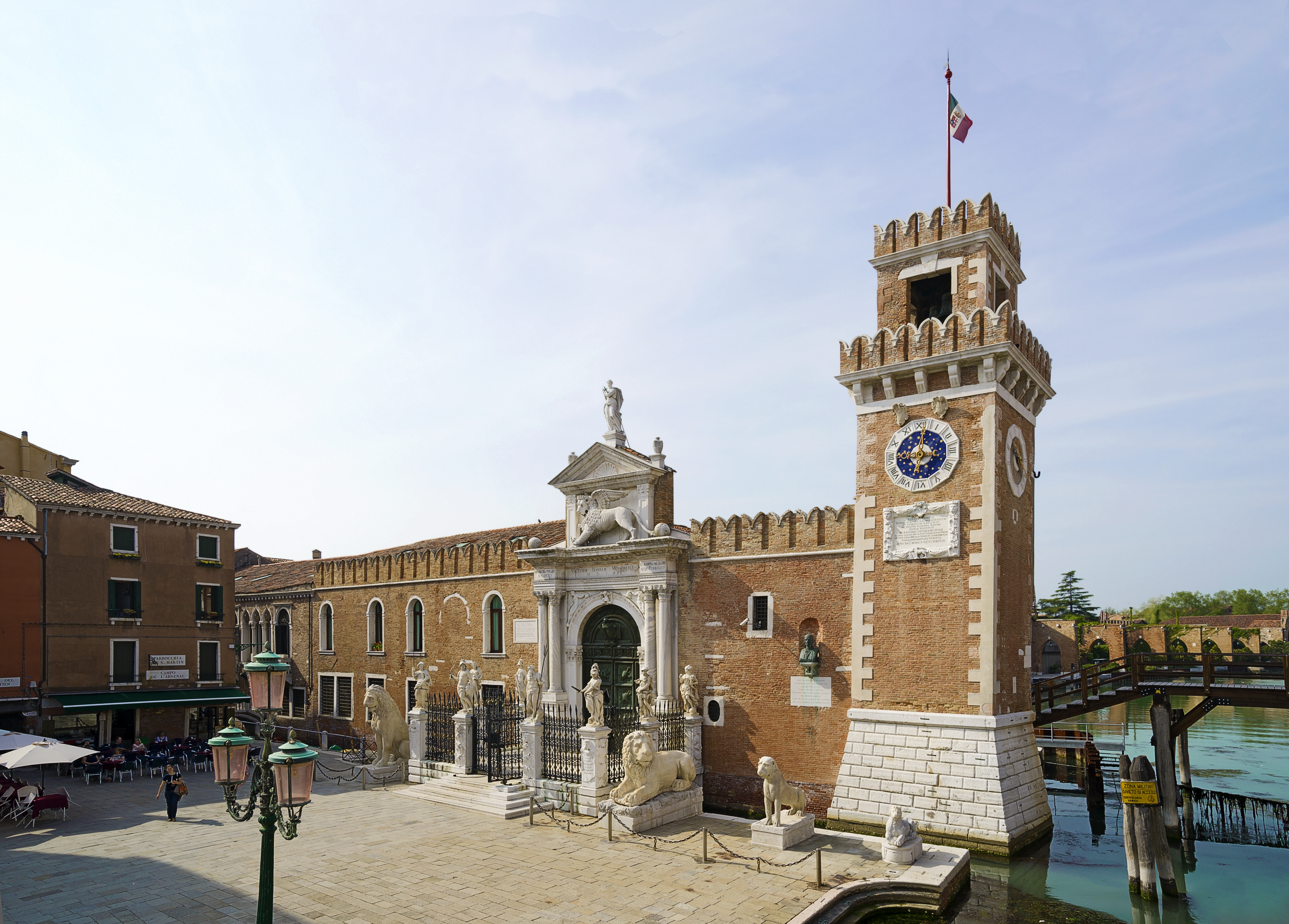
- The Land Gate with the seventeenth-century terrace and marble lions

Site information
- Type: Monumental city gate
- Controlled by: Republic of Venice

The Land Gate of the Venetian Arsenal, also known as Porta di Terra, Porta Magna, Porta da Terra or, in Venetian, Porta da tera, is the monumental land entrance to the Venetian Arsenal, where the Republic of Venice built and armed its public ships.

The monumental gate was completed in 1460 on the model of the classical triumphal arch, with a direct reference to the Arch of the Sergii in Pula. After the Battle of Lepanto, the winged Victories and the inscription of 1571 were added; in 1578 these were followed by the urns and the statue of Saint Justina. Between 1692 and 1695 the terrace with its railing and statues was built. In 1694 the wooden door leaves were also covered with copper. The first two Greek lions were placed in front of the gate in 1692; the lioness from Delos was added there in 1716.

== History ==
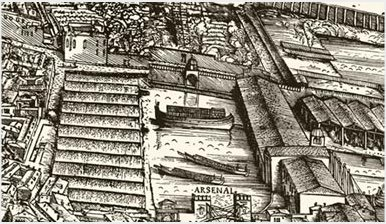
The Arsenal in Jacopo de' Barbari's 1500 view of Venice

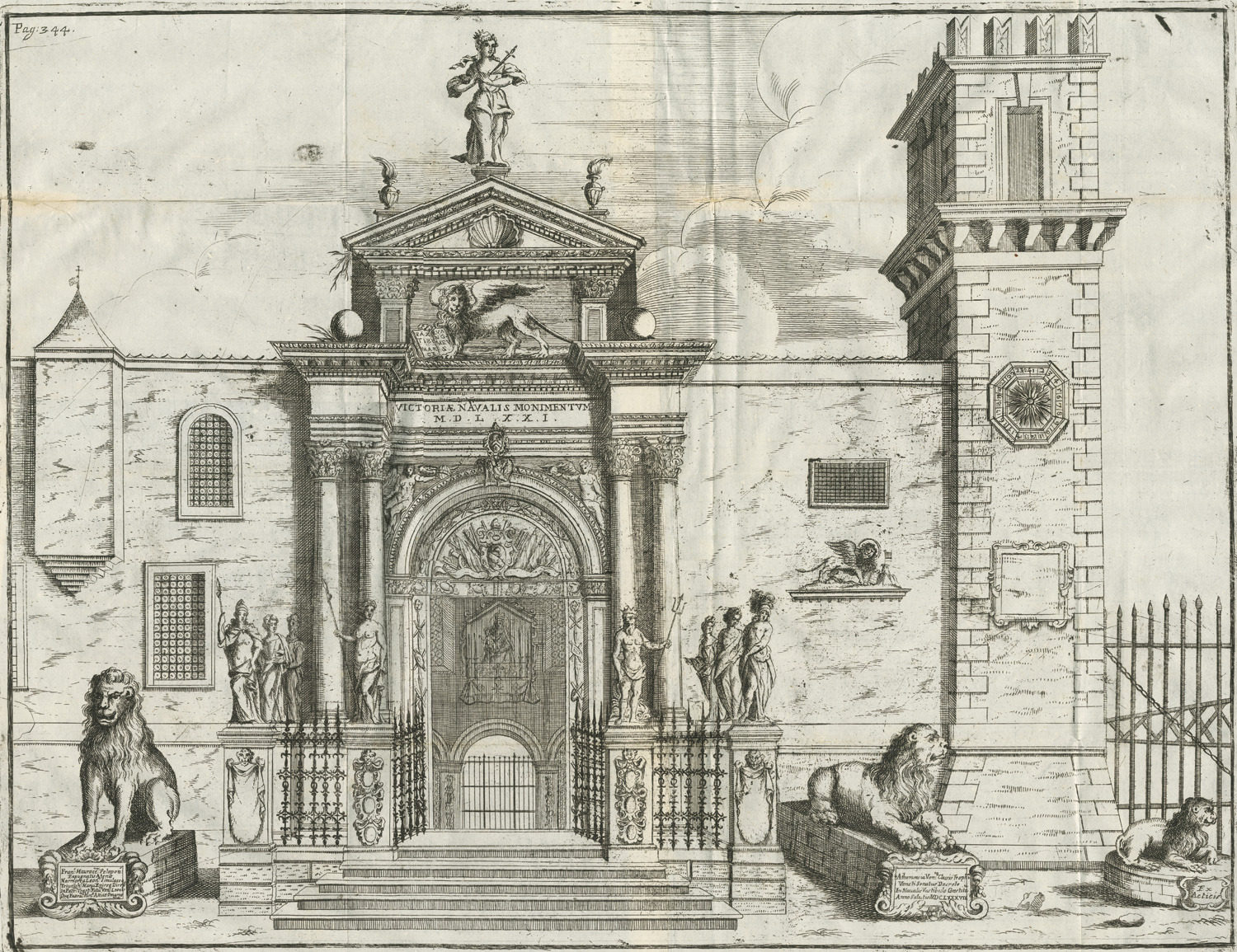
The Land Gate in a 1695 illustration

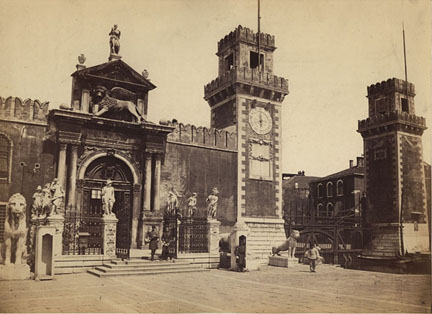
The portal in a photograph by Carlo Ponti, c. 1860-1870

The transformation of the medieval entrance was decided during the dogate of Pasquale Malipiero, with deliberations in 1458 and 1459. Calogero dates the beginning of the construction work to 1458 and its completion by 1460; Concina, while also recalling the deliberations of 1458 and 1459, instead places the beginning of the work in the spring of 1460. In its principal elements, the project followed the Arch of the Sergii in Pula: a large central arch, an attic and a frontispiece transformed the entrance into a triumphal arch.

The author of the project is not documented with certainty. The traditional attribution to Antonio Gambello has been questioned by both Concina and Calogero. Concina considers it difficult to reconcile this attribution with the style of the portal and proposes that Antonio Averlino, known as Filarete, who was in Venice on 10 April 1458, may have provided design indications; Calogero, however, does not consider a determining role by him to have been demonstrated.

The original inscriptions give 1460 as the year of completion and commemorate the doge with the words "DVCE INCLITO PASCALI / MARIPETRO"; the same text names the Patrons of the Arsenal Leo de Molino, Maffeo Contarini and Albano Cappello. The gate also appears in Jacopo de' Barbari's perspective view of Venice, dated 1500.

Between 1467 and 1468 the Republic decided to purchase and demolish several houses in front of the gate in order to open a space approximately 60 metres by 20 between the western bank of the rio dell'Arsenale and the portal. The deliberation of 24 March 1468 expressly required that the new gate remain in an open line of sight; the space was also used for the passage of processions of the doge and of foreign representatives heading to the Arsenal. Between 1524 and 1526 the open space was transformed into a square piazza.

The date of the atrium behind the portal has not been established precisely: it is described as having been built in 1523 or after that year, without a more precise date. The room, of simple forms, communicated by means of a marble staircase with the upper floor of the adjacent building, which housed the offices of the Magistracy of the Arsenal. The Madonna and Child by Jacopo Sansovino, signed and dated 1533-1534, was placed in the atrium. Sansovino had settled permanently in Venice in August 1527 and in 1529 had been appointed proto of the Procuratia of Saint Mark.

After the victory of the Christian fleet at Lepanto in 1571, new decorations were added to the gate. Venice had supplied the League with 110 galleys, compared with the 98 jointly provided by Spain, the Papal States and other Italian princes. Two winged Victories were inserted into the spandrels, the triangular spaces at the sides of the main arch. The inscription "VICTORIAE NAVALIS MONIMENTUM MDLXXI" appeared on the entablature. In 1578 two large marble urns were added to the attic and, at the top of the pediment, the colossal statue of Saint Justina sculpted by Girolamo Campagna. The choice of the saint recalled 7 October, the day of her liturgical feast and of the Battle of Lepanto.

From 1688 the Land Gate was modified in order also to commemorate the victories of Francesco Morosini in the Peloponnese during the Morean War. From 1692 the previous passage with a drawbridge gave way to a raised terrace with eight statues, military trophies and an iron railing. The works had been completed by 1695, the year of the death of Giovanni Comin, the sculptor of the statues of Mars and Neptune. No surviving document names the designer of the terrace; its attribution to Alessandro Tremignon derives from the fact that from 1677 he held the office of "proto alle fabbriche dell'Arsenale", responsible for the building works of the complex.

In 1694 the large wooden double-leaf gate was covered with copper plates worked in repoussé and decorated with trophies of arms. The covering included the coat of arms of Francesco Morosini and the inscription "FRAN. MAVROCENVS DVX". The leaves also displayed the coats of arms of the Marcello, Nani, Giustinian, Mocenigo and Malipiero families, referring to the provveditori of the Arsenal Agostino Marcello, Giacomo Nani and Giulio Giustinian and to the Patrons of the Arsenal Girolamo Mocenigo and Marco Malipiero.

== Description ==
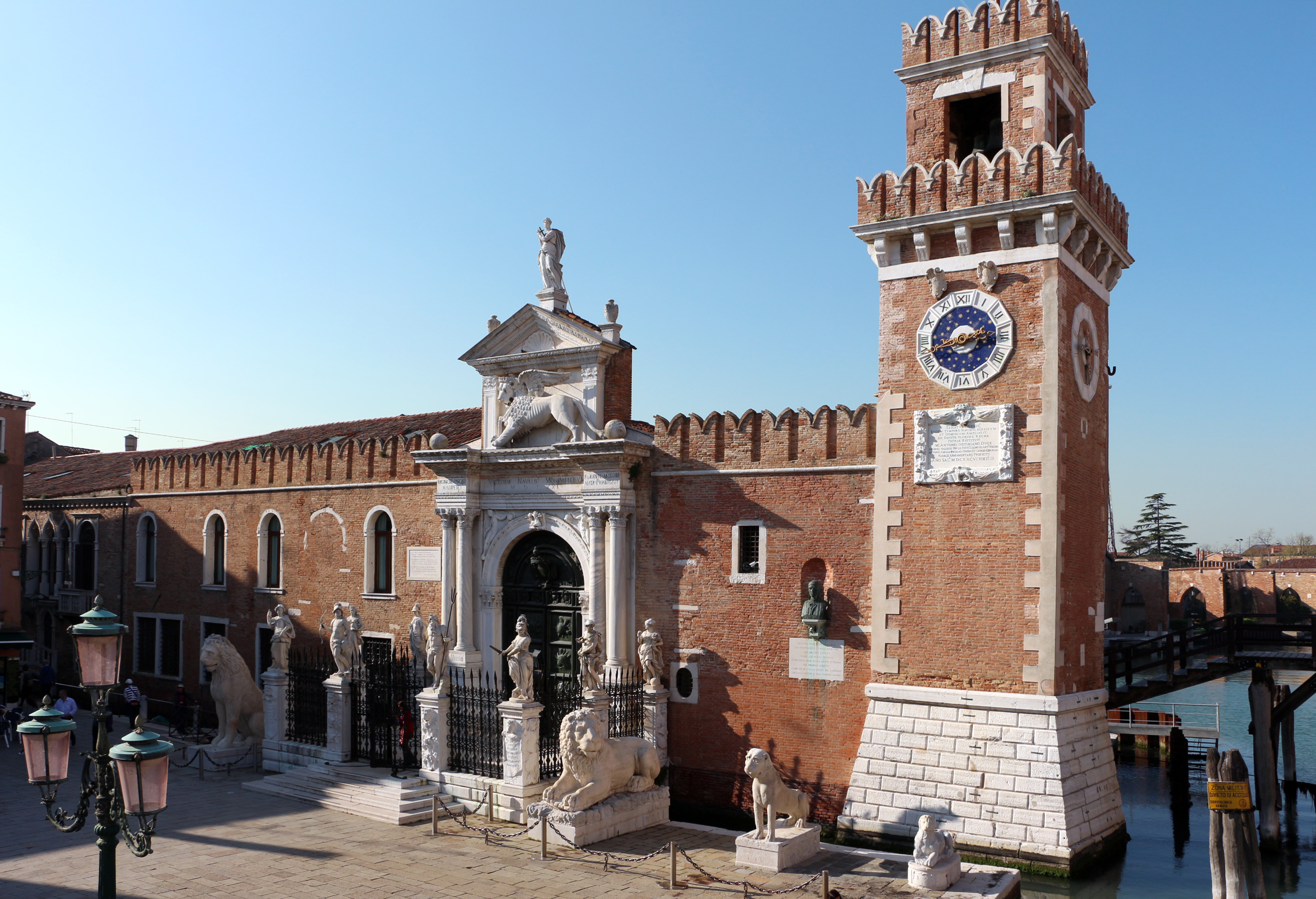
The fifteenth-century portal

The fifteenth-century portal is built of stone and opens into a large fornix, that is, a monumental arched opening. The lower part of the façade, as far as the architrave, fits within a square measuring four Venetian paces on each side; the span of the arch measures two paces, as do the height of the columns and the jambs. The central section is twice as wide as each lateral section. A grid of one-quarter of a pace regulates the width of the jambs and bases. Originally the overall height, including the marble spheres placed as acroteria on the frontispiece, corresponded to two superimposed squares.

Pairs of medieval columns in Greek marble stand at the sides of the fornix, with "exarchal" capitals belonging to the Byzantine tradition. Their reuse recalls the use of similar elements in the portals of St Mark's Basilica. The capitals, decorated with leaves of spiny acanthus, have been dated to the 12th century. Above the entablature rises the attic, crowned by the large passant Lion of Saint Mark, depicted in profile in motion. Paoletti cautiously proposed Bartolomeo Bon or a sculptor close to his manner; the attribution is not certain.

The arch follows a Roman model; the reused columns and capitals, on the other hand, belong to the Venetian Byzantine tradition. Concina interprets the juxtaposition as an intentional choice: the architecture presents Venice both as heir to Rome and as alterum Byzantium, "a second Byzantium", after the fall of Constantinople in 1453. In the upper part, the winged Victories and the inscription belong to the intervention of 1571; the urns and the statue of Saint Justina were added in 1578.

The atrium opens behind the fornix. Its construction is dated to 1523 or, without greater precision, to a later period. A marble staircase led from here to the offices of the Magistracy of the Arsenal. Sansovino's Madonna and Child, signed and dated 1533-1534, is set within an aedicula.

In front of the gate extends the terrace begun in 1692. The railing consists of six metal panels fixed to Istrian stone with lead and a two-leaf gate. Each panel is formed by eight vertical rods with an octagonal cross-section; five cast decorative elements ornament each rod, which terminates at the top in a spearhead. Eight pedestals with trophies in relief support the same number of statues.

The four statues facing the campo are, from left to right for a viewer facing the gate, Justice, Mars, Neptune and Bellona. The signed Justice is the work of Heinrich Meyring; Mars and Neptune are by Giovanni Comin. Bellona is by Francesco Penso, known as Cabianca.

The attributions of the four statues facing the Arsenal do not coincide. The Zeri catalogue assigns the two female allegories placed behind Justice and Mars to an anonymous 17th-century Venetian sculptor; it instead identifies the figures behind Neptune and Bellona as Vigilance and Abundance, attributing both to Tommaso Rues. In 2006 Wolff instead described all four inner figures as works by unknown artists, without identifying their subjects with certainty.

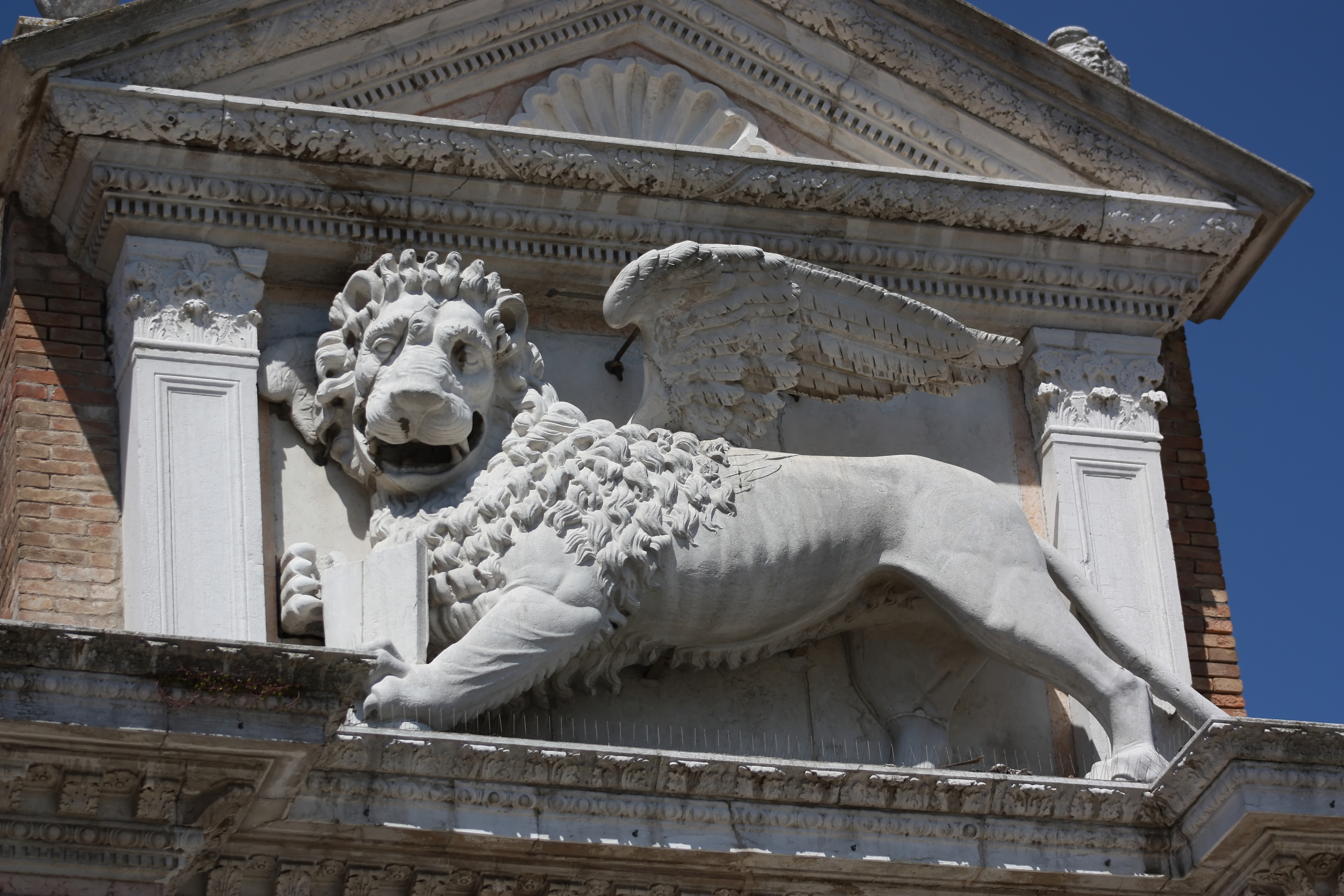
The Lion of Saint Mark on the attic

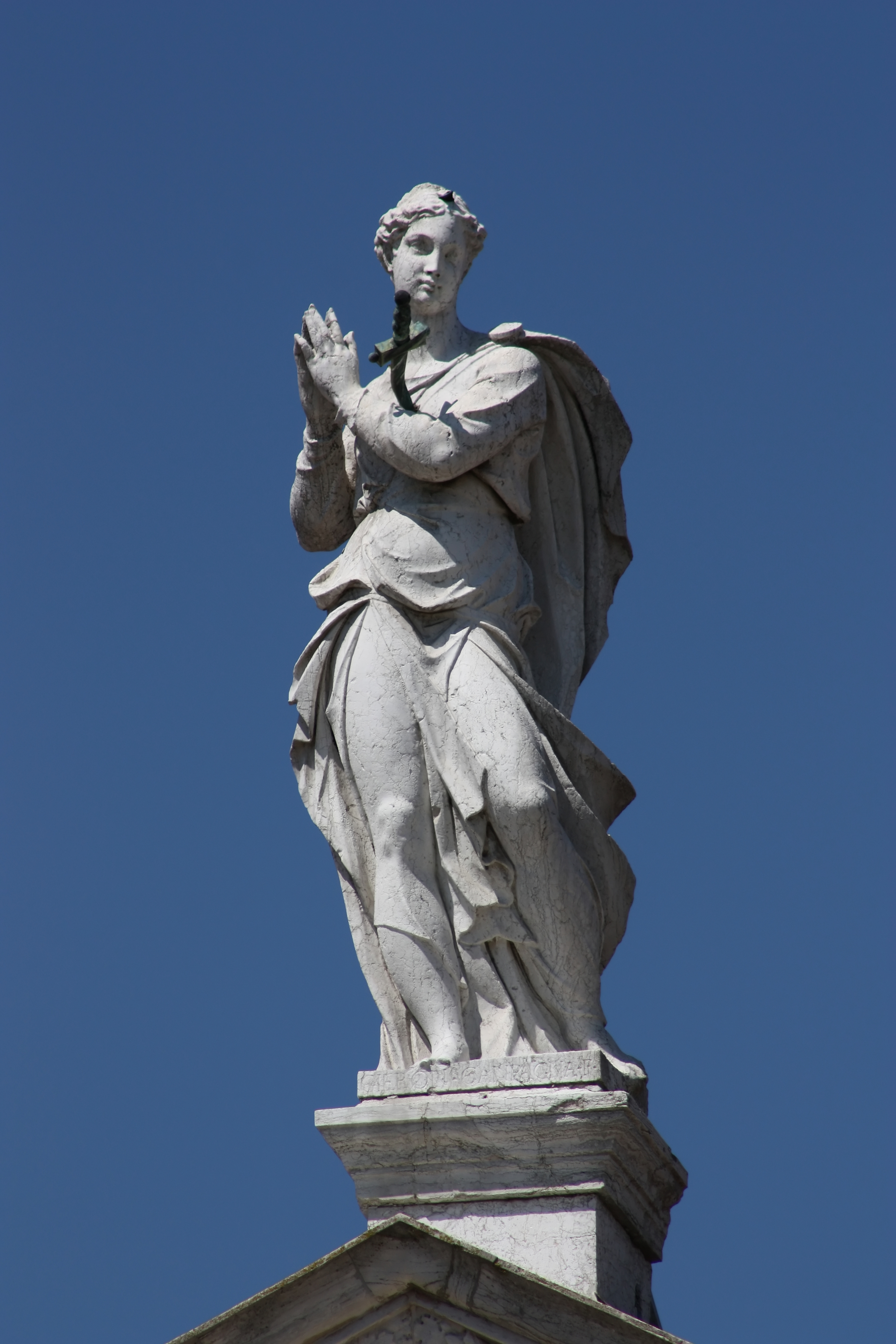
The statue of Saint Justina by Girolamo Campagna

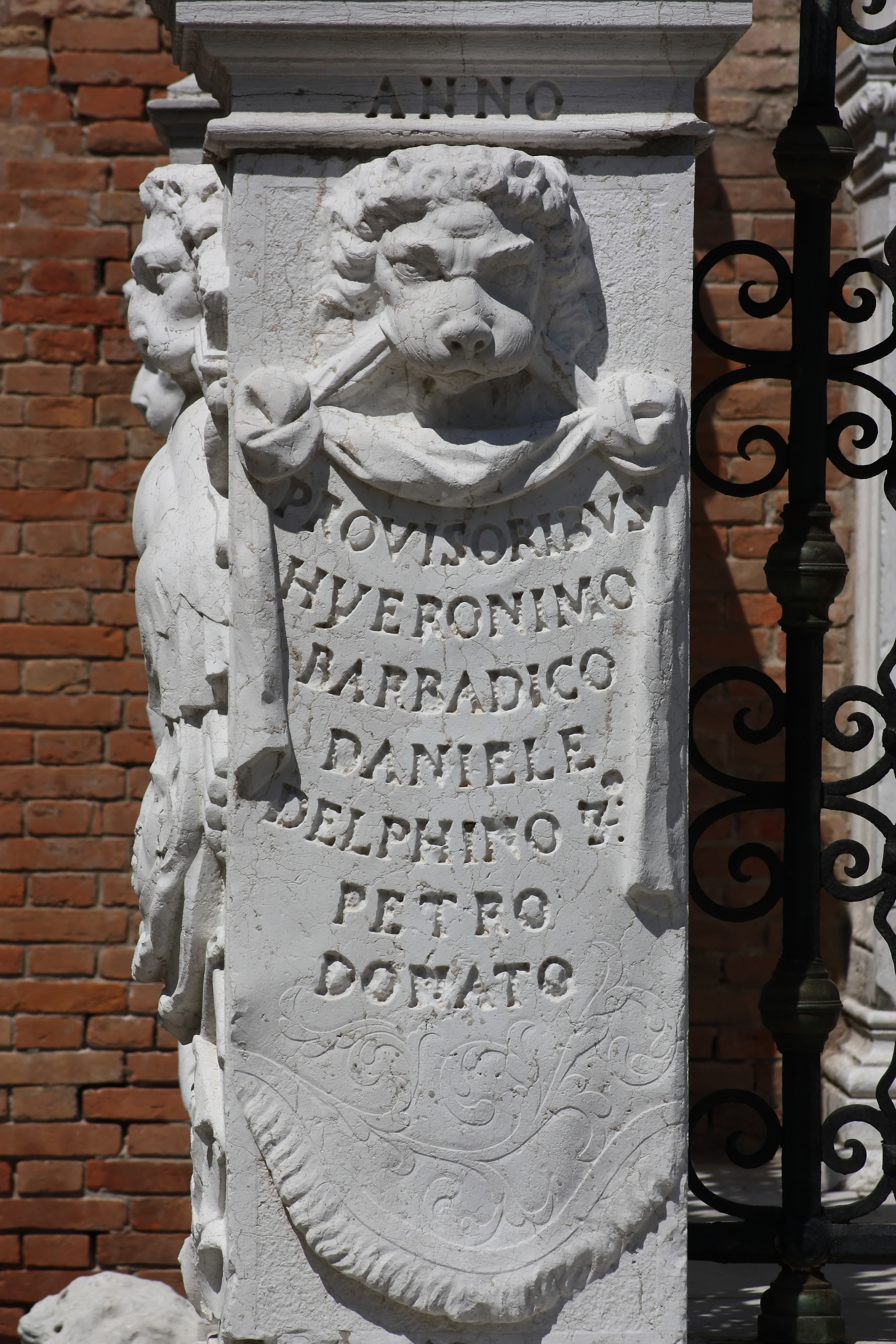
Stone inscriptions of the Land Gate

=== Lions of the Arsenal ===
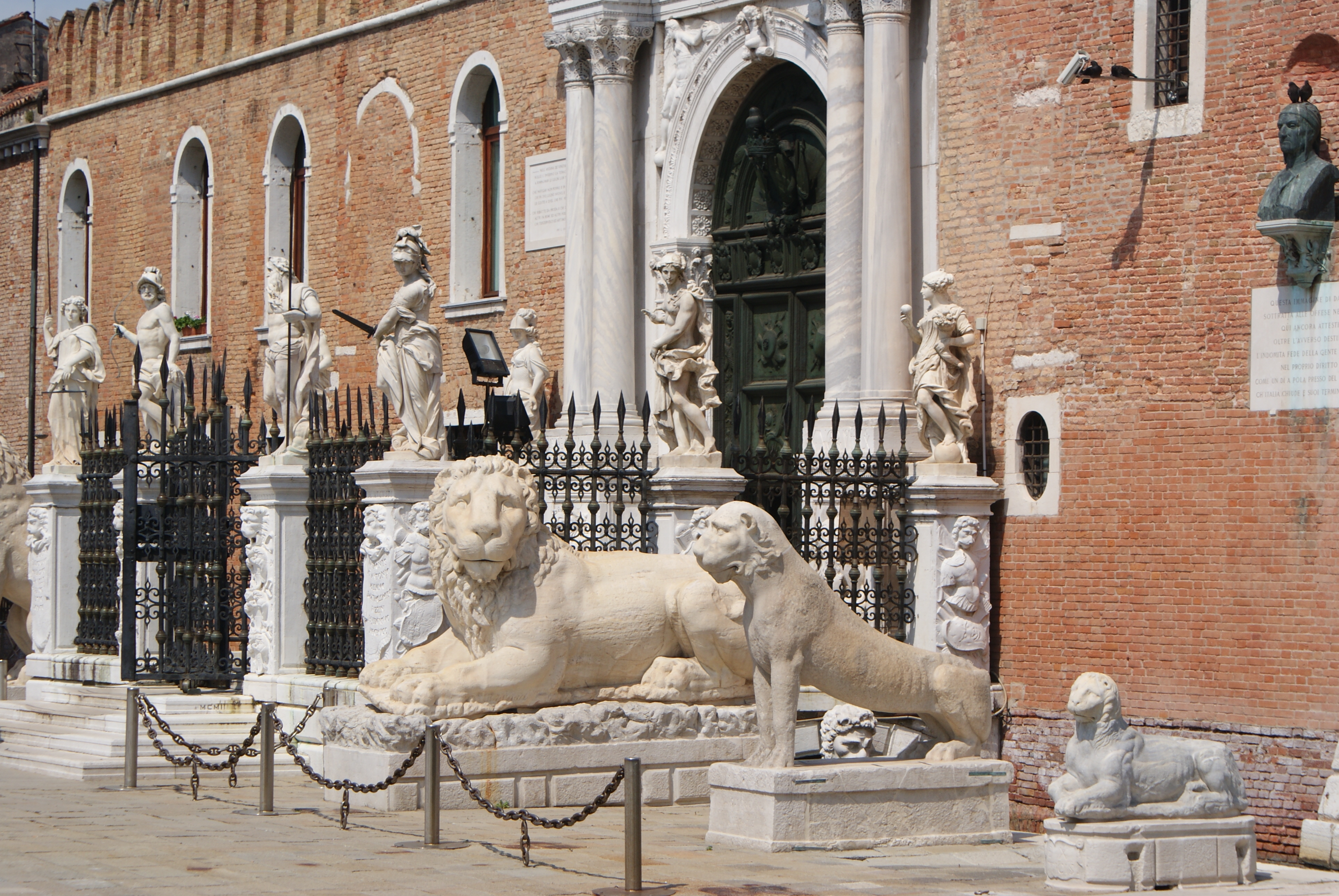
The lions and statues in front of the Land Gate

Four Greek zoomorphic sculptures stand in front of the Land Gate. The Piraeus Lion and the crouching lion from Attica were placed near the terrace in 1692; the Senate approved the definitive placement of the two trophies on 15 March. The lioness from Delos was added in 1716. No precise date of placement is documented for the fourth sculpture.

The largest is the Piraeus Lion, approximately three metres high. It was probably carved in the 360s BC as a funerary monument and was later reused as a fountain in the port of Piraeus, where it became such a well-known landmark that in the Middle Ages the port was also called "Porto Leone". The Venetian fleet transferred it to Venice in March 1688 as war booty; after some restorations it was placed in front of the Arsenal in 1692.

Three 11th-century runic inscriptions are carved on its sides, probably the work of Swedish mercenaries, the Varangians, in the service of the Byzantine Empire. The erosion of the marble and the damage caused by the fighting of 1687 prevent a complete reading of the texts. In the 2023 reconstruction, the first and third inscriptions commemorate dead companions; the second is interpreted as a short graffito. An epigraph was placed on the base celebrating Francesco Morosini "The Peloponnesiac", the conquest of Athens and the transfer of the lions to Venice.

To the right of the entrance lies the so-called Hephaisteion lion, an Attic sculpture of the 4th century BC probably intended for a funerary monument. It comes from the vicinity of the Sacred Way between Athens and Eleusis; the visible head does not belong to the ancient body. The bronze plaque on the base bore the inscription "ATHENIENSIA VENETAE CLASSIS / TROPHOEA VENETI SENATVS / DECRETO IN NAVALIS / VESTIBVLO CONSTITVTA", which described it as an Athenian trophy of the Venetian fleet placed at the entrance to the Arsenal.

The plaque of the Piraeus Lion remained in bronze until 1797; that of the Hephaisteion lion was also removed. By 1829 both inscriptions had already been reproduced on the bases. The plaques were removed during the French occupation; the texts were then re-engraved on the Istrian stone, and exposure to the elements reduced their legibility.

The lioness of Delos comes from the island of Delos and was placed in front of the Arsenal in 1716 to commemorate the Venetian defence of Corfu from the Ottoman siege. The sculpture, however, was already in Venice before December 1684: it had been brought from Delos by Alvise Pasqualigo, who died that month, therefore before Morosini's Peloponnesian campaigns and the expedition of Andrea Pisani. In 1716 Domenico Pasqualigo, provveditore of the Arsenal, donated it to commemorate the liberation of Corfu from the Turks. The body, in Naxian marble (from the island of Naxos), dates to the end of the 7th century BC and belongs to the group of archaic lions of Delos; the head is a Baroque addition. The base bears the inscription "ANNO CORCYRAE / LIBERATAE".

The sculpture closest to the canal has been interpreted as a crouching dog, a kind of mastiff or pseudo-molosser, rather than as a lion. It is made of Hymettian marble (from the area of Hymettus) and is dated to around 320 BC; the head is a restoration addition of unspecified date. It has not been established from which place in Attica it came or when it was placed in front of the Arsenal. Rafn hypothesised that it had arrived from Athens together with the two trophies placed in 1692 and that it had been installed near the gate after 1692, without specifying the year. The base bears only the inscription "EX / ATTICIS".

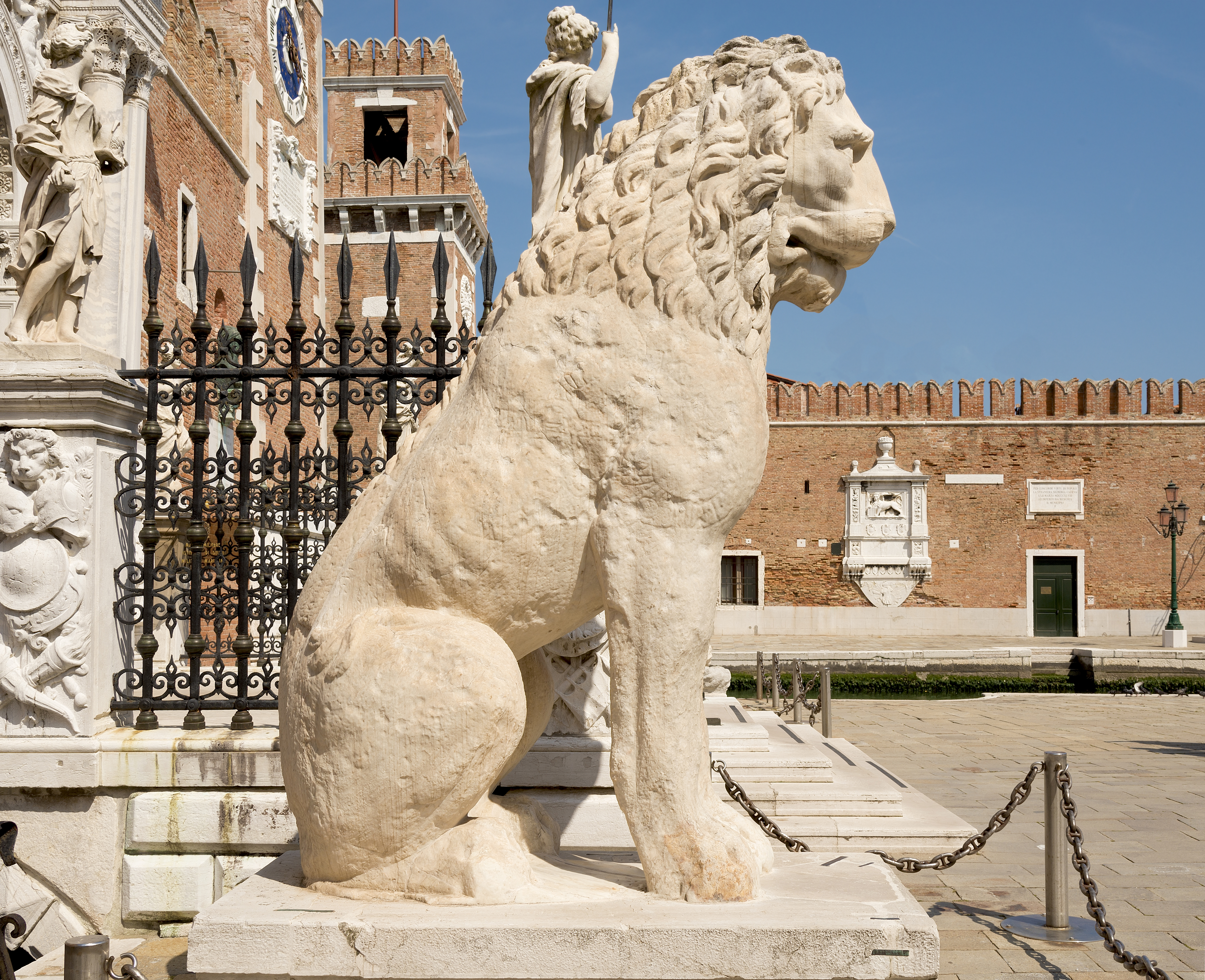
The Piraeus Lion

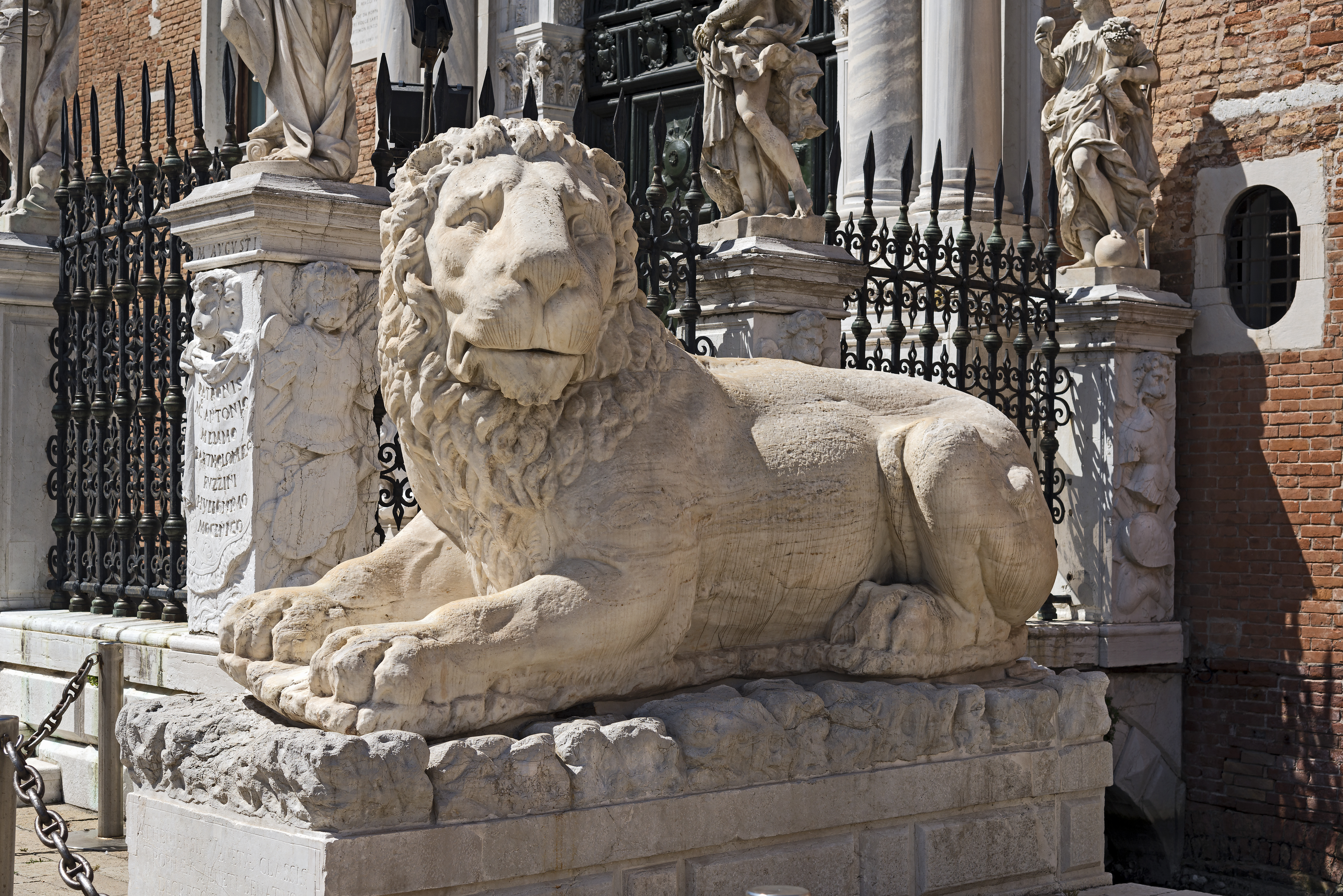
The Hephaisteion lion, from Attica

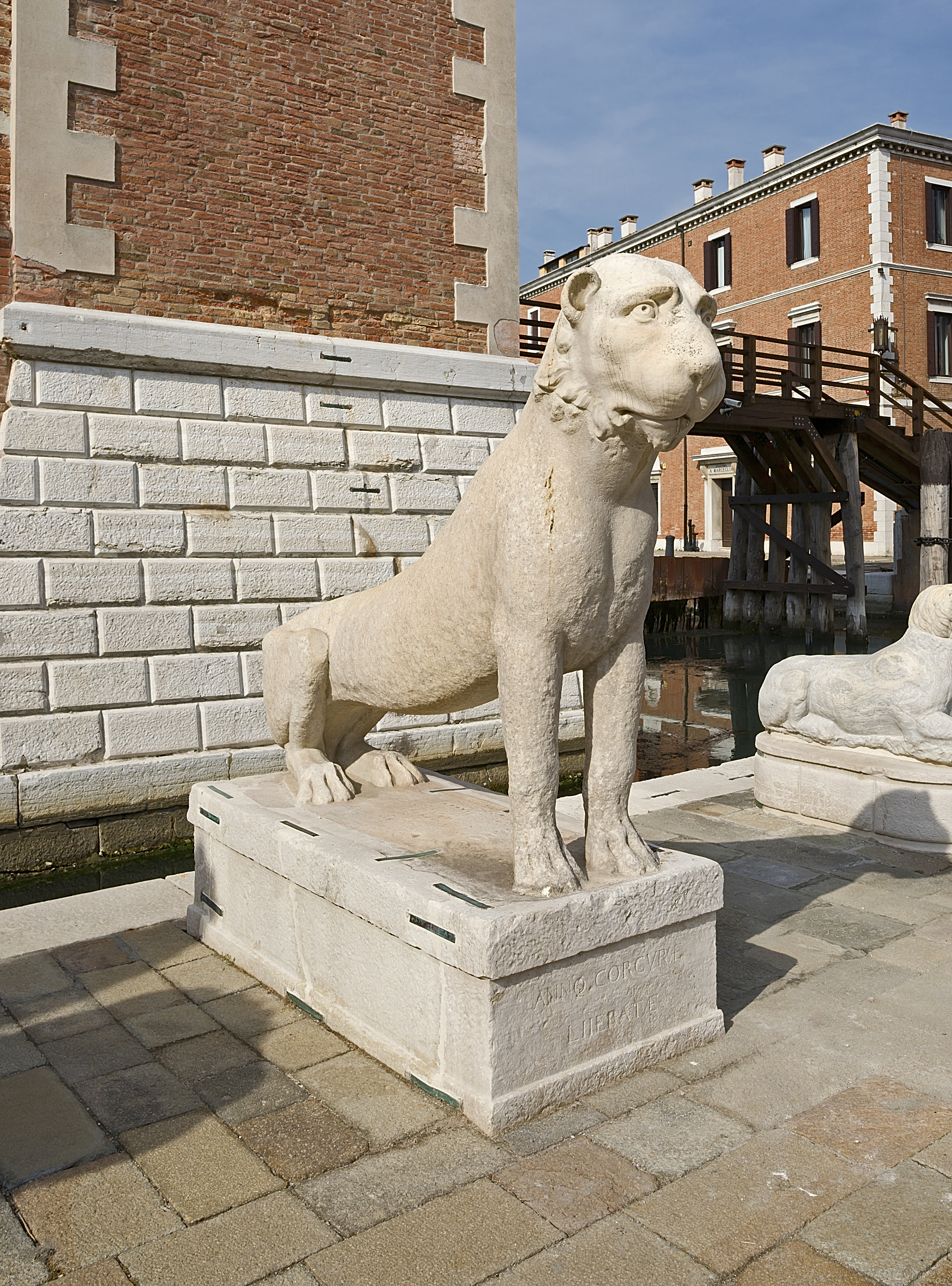
The lioness from Delos

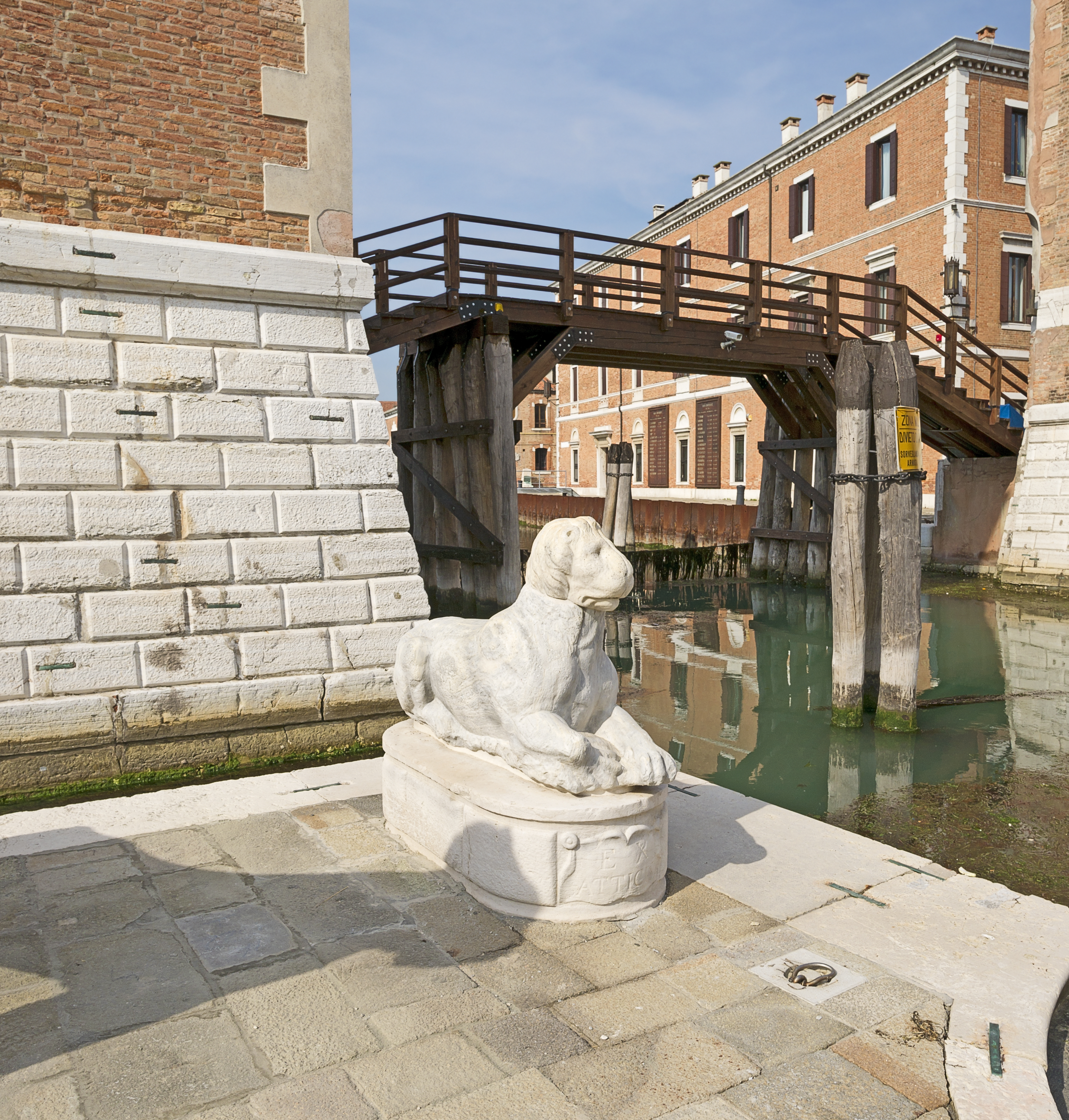
The sculpture closest to the canal, with the inscription "EX ATTICIS"

== See also ==
- Venetian Arsenal
- Piraeus Lion
- Francesco Morosini
