= Sergia gens =

Ancient Roman noble family

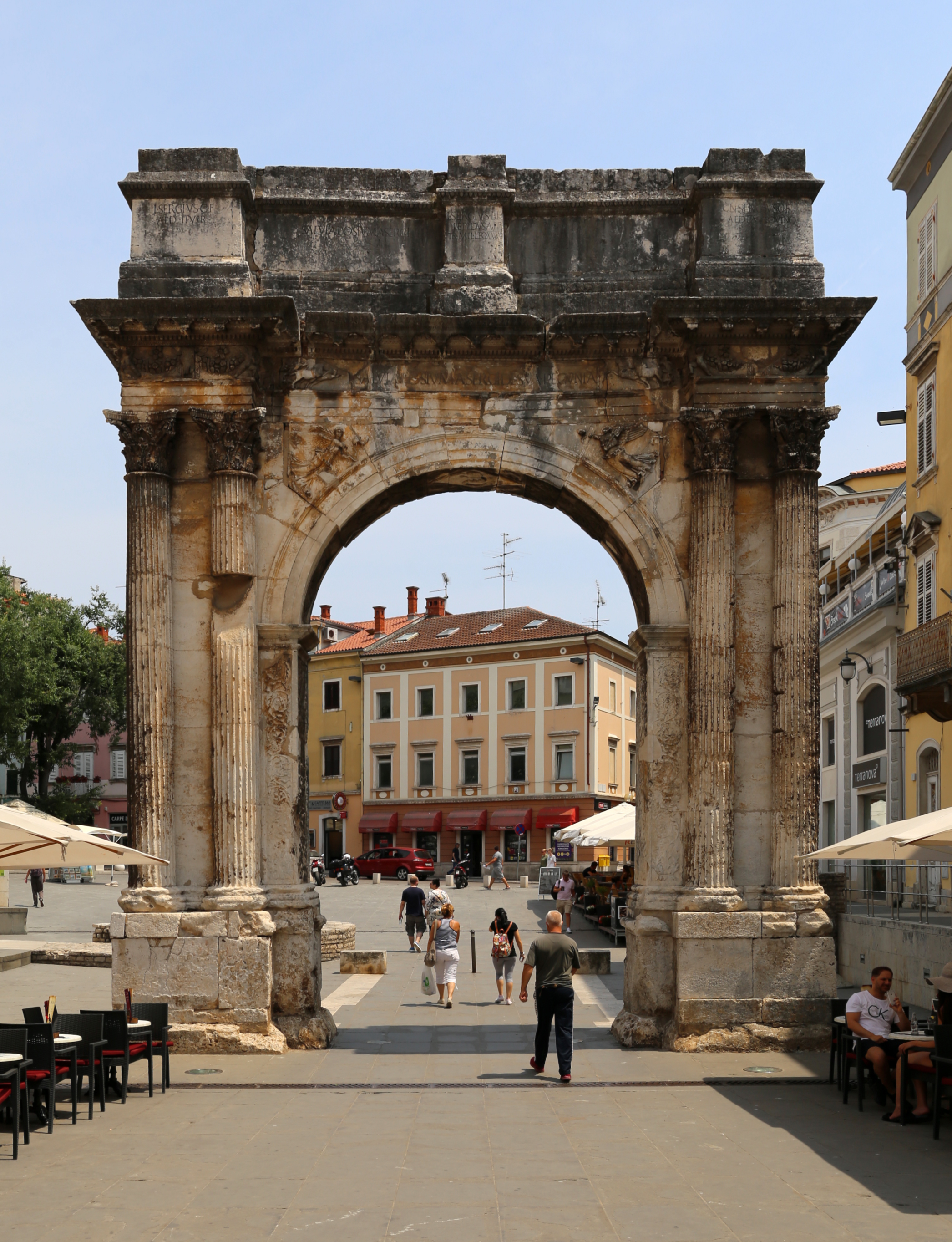
Arch of the Sergii in Pula, Croatia

The gens Sergia was a patrician family at ancient Rome, which held the highest offices of the Roman state from the first century of the Republic until imperial times. The first of the Sergii to obtain the consulship was Lucius Sergius Fidenas in 437 BC. Despite long and distinguished service, toward the end of the Republic the reputation of this gens suffered as a result of the conspiracy of Catiline.

== Origin ==
The Sergii claimed descent from Sergestus, one of the Trojans who came to Italy with Aeneas, a tradition mentioned by Vergil in the Aeneid. The etymology of the nomen Sergius is problematic. Chase hesitantly suggests a connection with the praenomen Servius, probably from an old Latin root meaning to preserve or keep safe. He classifies the nomen with other gentilicia that either originated at Rome, or cannot be shown to have come from anywhere else. However, the cognomen Fidenas, borne by the first branch of this gens appearing in history, may indicate that they originally came from Fidenae, where Roman colonies had been planted for centuries.

== Praenomina ==
The main praenomen of the Sergia gens was Lucius, which was used by all branches of the family at all periods. Gaius was also used from the earliest times, while Marcus was favoured by the Sergii Sili. All of these were among the most common praenomina throughout Roman history. The only other name regularly used by the Sergii was Manius, a relatively distinctive praenomen favoured by a few gentes, which belonged to one of the most illustrious of the Sergii of the early Republic, and was still in use after the Second Punic War. Other praenomina appear infrequently.

== Branches and cognomina ==
The cognomina of the Sergii during the Republic were Catilina, Esquilinus, Fidenas, Orata, Paulus, Plancus, and Silus. Some of the Sergii who appear in history had no surname.

Fidenas, the surname of the oldest distinct family of the Sergii, is said to have been obtained by Lucius Sergius Fidenas, the consul of 437 BC. The year before his consulship, the Romans had put down a revolt at Fidenae, an ancient Latin city about five miles north of Rome; the implication perhaps being that Sergius had participated in the recovery of the city. However, it may be that Sergius, or one of his ancestors, was a native of that city, where a Roman colony was said to have existed since the early monarchial period. One of the Fidenates bore the additional surname Coxo, applied to one with prominent hips.

Esquilinus originally designated someone who lived on the Esquiline Hill, one of the Seven Hills of Rome, may have been a personal cognomen, as only one of the Sergii is known to have borne it. This cognomen belongs to a common class of surnames derived from the place of a person's origin or residence.

The most distinguished family of the Sergii during the latter part of the Republic bore the cognomen Silus, originally describing someone with an upturned nose. The first of this branch rose to fame during the Second Punic War, but by the time of Catiline, who was his great-grandson, they had fallen into poverty and obscurity.

Of other surnames, Orata or Aurata, golden, was the surname of a wealthy merchant of the Sergian gens, who is said to have obtained it either because of his substantial gold rings, or because he kept goldfish. Meanwhile, Plancus, referring to someone with flat or splayed feet, belongs to a common class of surnames derived from the physical characteristics of the bearer. This is amended by some scholars to Plautus, although the meaning is nearly identical.

== Members ==
This list includes abbreviated praenomina. For an explanation of this practice, see filiation.

=== Sergii Fidenates ===
- Lucius Sergius C. f. C. n. Fidenas, consul in 437 and 429 BC, and consular tribune in 433, 424, and 418.
- Manius Sergius L. f. L. n. Fidenas, consular tribune in 404 BC, during which year he and his colleagues captured and destroyed the Volscian town of Artena. Consular tribune for the second time in 402 BC, personal enmity between Sergius and his colleague, Lucius Verginius, led to a Roman defeat and the evacuation of one of the Roman fortifications in the siege of Veii. The following year, Sergius and Verginius were prosecuted by the tribunes of the plebs, and fined ten thousand asses apiece.
- Lucius Sergius M'. f. L. n. Fidenas, consular tribune in 397 BC.
- Gaius Sergius Fidenas, (Note: Livy gives his praenomen as Gaius, but a fragment of the Fasti Capitolini appears to give Gnaeus.) surnamed Coxo, consular tribune in 387, 385, and 380 BC.

=== Sergii Sili ===
- Marcus Sergius Silus, praetor urbanus in 197 BC, had displayed great courage during the Second Punic War, serving in several campaigns and sustaining numerous wounds, including the loss of his right hand, after which he continued to fight using his left hand.
- Marcus Sergius M. f. Silus, a legate under Lucius Aemilius Paullus during the Third Macedonian War.
- Marcus Sergius (M. f. M. n.) Silus, probably the uncle of Catiline, was quaestor in an uncertain year, and minted a number of denarii between 94 and 90 BC.
- Gnaeus Sergius Silus, accused by one Quintus Caecilius Metellus Celer of attempting to seduce a Roman matron by the promise of money, and condemned.
- Lucius Sergius M. f. M. n. Silus, the father of Catiline, does not seem to have had a public career, and he left no legacy for his son.
- Lucius Sergius L. f. M. n. Catilina, better known as Catiline, had been a fierce partisan of Sulla, and earned a reputation for savageness and cruelty, but was still able to attain political office. He was praetor in 68 BC, and afterward governor of Africa. After being frustrated in his attempts to gain the consulship, he formed a plot to overthrow the Republic in 63, but the plot was exposed by Cicero. Catiline fled the city and attempted to rally his forces, but was intercepted and fell in battle.
- Sergia L. f. M. n., the sister of Catiline, and widow of the eques Quintus Caecilius, who had perished in Sulla's proscriptions.

=== Sergii Plauti ===
- Lucius Sergius L. f. Plautus, named in a senatus consultum from 39 BC.
- Lucius Sergius Regis f. Plautus, one of the Salii Palatini, was presumably adopted from the Marcii Reges.
- Sergia, the wife of Gaius Rubellius Blandus, proconsul of Crete and Cyrene. Their grandson was Rubellius Plautus.
- Sergius Plautus, praetor in AD 2.
- Sergia, the wife of Gaius Octavius Laenas, the consul suffectus in AD 33. Their grandson was the emperor Nerva.

=== Sergii Paulli ===
- Lucius Sergius Paullus, proconsul of Cyprus in the time of Claudius, said to have been converted to Christianity by the apostle Paul. Perhaps the same Paullus mentioned as curator of the banks of the Tiber.
- Lucius Sergius Paullus, consul suffectus in an uncertain year, around AD 70.
- Sergia Paulla, daughter of the proconsul and wife of Gaius Caristanius Fronto.
- Sergius Paullus, a senator mentioned by Martial, who indicates he was consul ordinarius designatus around 95.
- Sergia L.f. Paullina, wife of Gnaeus Pinarius Cornelius Severus, consul suffectus in AD 112.
- Lucius Sergius Paullus, consul suffectus circa AD 151, and consul ordinarius in 168.

=== Others ===
- Lucius Sergius Esquilinus, (Note: Esquilinus' praenomen is very uncertain. Livy first calls the decemvir Marcus, then later refers to him as Lucius. Dionysius gives Marcus, but Diodorus has Gaius. His praenomen has not been preserved in the Fasti Capitolini.) a member of the second decemvirate in 450 and 449 BC.
- Sergia, one of a group of Roman matrons accused of mass poisonings in 331 BC, the year of a deadly pestilence at Rome. Livy reports confusion in his sources, but records that Sergia and Cornelia, claiming that certain preparations in their houses were medicines, were obliged to drink them to prove their innocence, and perished as a result.
- Marcus Sergius, a military tribune sent to Rhegium by Scipio Africanus in 205 BC. There he was murdered by the propraetor Quintus Pleminius.
- Lucius Sergius, one of the ambassadors sent to Carthage by Scipio Africanus in 203 BC.
- Gaius Sergius Plancus, praetor urbanus in 200 BC; the following year he was appointed propraetor for distributing land to the veterans of the war in Hispania, Sardinia, and Sicily.
- Manius Sergius M'. f., a senator in 170 BC. He was also ambassador in Greece and Asia in 164.
- Manius Sergius M'. f., praetor and proconsul in Hispania Citerior during the late second century BC. His name appears on the milestones of a road from modern Granollers towards Ausa.
- Gaius Sergius Orata, a wealthy merchant and inventor who flourished around the beginning of the first century BC. He pioneered the use of the hypocaust to heat Roman baths. He was also known for the farming of oysters at Baiae, and promoting the shellfish of the Lucrine Lake.
- Quintus Sergius, a senator who lived at the time of the Social War, was condemned inter sicarios; that is, by a court of inquiry into those accused of being assassins.
- Lucius Sergius, one of Catiline's accomplices, who supplied him with weaponry. He later fell in with Publius Clodius Pulcher.
- Sergius, one of those proscribed by the triumvirs, sought the assistance of Marcus Antonius, who was able to procure his pardon.
- Sergius, the son of Aphthonius, is described in the Suda as a consular who served as praetorian prefect. He was a native of Zeugma, and had a brother, Sabinus. Sergius wrote a treatise in opposition to Aelius Aristides.
- Sergius, a Latin grammarian, and the author of In Primam Donati Editionem Commentarium and In Secundam Donati Editionem Commentaria.
- Lucius Sergius Salvidienus Scipio Orfitus, consul in AD 149.
- Publius Martius Sergius Saturninus, consul in AD 198.
- Flavius Sergius, consul in AD 350.

== See also ==
- Arch of the Sergii
- List of Roman gentes

== Bibliography ==
- Marcus Tullius Cicero, De Domo Sua, De Finibus Bonorum et Malorum, De Officiis, De Oratore, Epistulae ad Atticum, Epistulae ad Familiares, In Catilinam, In Pisonem, Pro Cluentio, Pro Flacco, Pro Murena, Pro Plancio.
- Quintus Tullius Cicero, De Petitione Consulatus (attributed).
- Gaius Sallustius Crispus (Sallust), Bellum Catilinae (The Conspiracy of Catiline).
- Diodorus Siculus, Bibliotheca Historica (Library of History).
- Marcus Terentius Varro, Rerum Rusticarum (Rural Matters).
- Publius Vergilius Maro (Vergil), Aeneid.
- Dionysius of Halicarnassus, Romaike Archaiologia (Roman Antiquities).
- Titus Livius (Livy), History of Rome.
- Valerius Maximus, Factorum ac Dictorum Memorabilium (Memorable Facts and Sayings).
- Quintus Asconius Pedianus, Commentarius in Oratio Ciceronis In Toga Candida (Commentary on Cicero's Oration In Toga Candida).
- Lucius Junius Moderatus Columella, De Re Rustica.
- Gaius Plinius Secundus (Pliny the Elder), Historia Naturalis (Natural History).
- Lucius Mestrius Plutarchus (Plutarch), Lives of the Noble Greeks and Romans.
- Gaius Suetonius Tranquillus, De Vita Caesarum (Lives of the Caesars, or The Twelve Caesars).
- Appianus Alexandrinus (Appian), Bellum Civile (The Civil War).
- Sextus Pompeius Festus, Epitome de M. Verrio Flacco de Verborum Significatu (Epitome of Marcus Verrius Flaccus' On the Meaning of Words).
- Suda.
- Dictionary of Greek and Roman Biography and Mythology, William Smith, ed., Little, Brown and Company, Boston (1849).
- Theodor Mommsen et alii, Corpus Inscriptionum Latinarum (The Body of Latin Inscriptions, abbreviated CIL), Berlin-Brandenburgische Akademie der Wissenschaften (1853–present).
- Wilhelm Dittenberger, Sylloge Inscriptionum Graecarum (Collection of Greek Inscriptions, abbreviated SIG), Leipzig (1883).
- René Cagnat et alii, L'Année épigraphique (The Year in Epigraphy, abbreviated AE), Presses Universitaires de France (1888–present).
- August Pauly, Georg Wissowa, et alii, Realencyclopädie der Classischen Altertumswissenschaft (Scientific Encyclopedia of the Knowledge of Classical Antiquities, abbreviated RE or PW), J. B. Metzler, Stuttgart (1894–1980).
- George Davis Chase, "The Origin of Roman Praenomina", in Harvard Studies in Classical Philology, vol. VIII, pp. 103–184 (1897).
- G. L. Cheesman, "The Family of the Caristanii at Antioch in Pisidia", in Journal of Roman Studies, No. 3 (1913).
- Broughton, T. Robert S. (1952–1986). The Magistrates of the Roman Republic. American Philological Association.
- Papers and Monographs of the American Academy in Rome, vol. 16 (1955).
- Géza Alföldy, Konsulat und Senatorenstand unter der Antonien (The Consulate and Senatorial State under the Antonines), Rudolf Habelt, Bonn (1977).
- Anthony Birley, The Fasti of Roman Britain, Clarendon Press, Oxford (1981).
- Brian W. Jones, "Martial's Paullus", in Latomus, No. 41 (1982).
- Ronald Syme, Roman Papers: Volume IV, Clarendon Press, Oxford (1988) ISBN 9780198148739.
- Tonnes Bekker-Nielsen, in Classica et Mediaevalia, vol. 57 (2006).
- Brandon Winningham, Catiline, iUniverse (2007).
