= Sergestus =

Character in the Aeneid

In Roman mythology, Sergestus was a Trojan friend of Aeneas. He was the ancestor of gens Sergia, a famous Patrician family of which Catilina was a member. Hence he is also the ultimate namesake of the given names Sergey, Sergio, etc.

== Mythology ==
In Virgil's Aeneid, after the boat race during Anchises' Funeral games Aeneas gives to Sergestus a Cretan slave girl named Pholoe in gratitude for saving both ship and crew, after he ran aground. This is one of the examples of Aeneas showing his fair and compassionate nature, as despite the fact Sergestus comes last in the boat race he still receives a prize.

And Sergestus, from the house of the name Sergia

— Virgil, Sergestusque, domus tenet a quo Sergia nomen, Aeneid (Latin)

Sergestus also appears as a minor character in Christopher Marlowe's play Dido, Queen of Carthage.
