= Arch of the Sergii =

Triumphal arch in Pula, Croatia

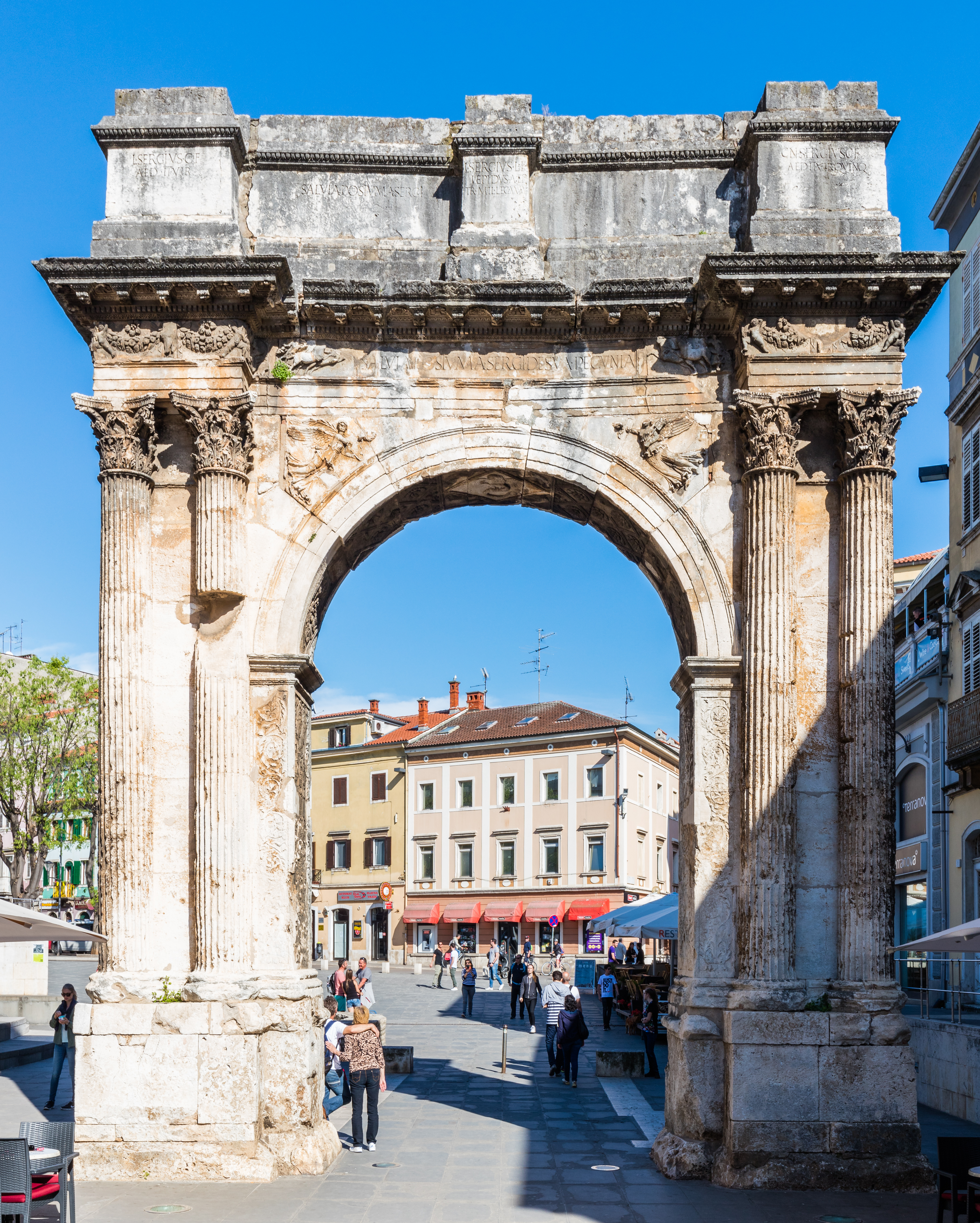
- The arch today (west view)
- Interactive map of Arch of the Sergii
- Location: Pula, Croatia
- Coordinates: 44.8683°N 13.8469°E
- Type: Triumphal arch
- Beginning date: c. 29 BC
- Completion date: c. 27 BC
- Dedicated to: The Sergii family

Arch of the Sergii (Croatian: Slavoluk Sergijevaca; Italian: Arco dei Sergi) is an Ancient Roman triumphal arch located in Pula, Croatia. The arch commemorates three members of the Sergii family, specifically Lucius Sergius Lepidus, a tribune serving in the twenty-ninth legion that participated in the Battle of Actium and disbanded in 27 BC. This suggests an approximate date of construction: 29–27 BC. The arch stood behind the original naval gate of the early Roman colony. The Sergii were a powerful family of officials in the colony and retained their power for centuries.

== History ==
The honorary triumphal arch, originally a city gate, was erected as a symbol of the victory at Actium. As the main inscription proclaims, it was paid for by the wife of Lepidus, Salvia Postuma Sergia. Both of their names are carved in the stone along with Lucius Sergius and Gaius Sergius, the honoree's father and uncle respectively. In its original form, statues of the two elders flanked Lepidus on both sides on the top of the arch. On either side of the inscription, a frieze depicts cupids, garlands and bucrania.

This small arch with pairs of crenelated Corinthian columns and winged victories in the spandrels, was built on the facade of a gate (Porta Aurea) in the walls, so the part, visible from the town-side, was decorated. The decoration is late hellenistic, with major Asia Minor influences. The low relief on the frieze represents a scene with a war chariot drawn by horses.

The main (land) entrance to the Venice Arsenal, one of the earliest works of Venetian Renaissance architecture, built around the 1460s, is largely based on the arch.

This arch has attracted the attention of many artists, including Michelangelo and Piranesi.

Venice Arsenal, c. 1450s

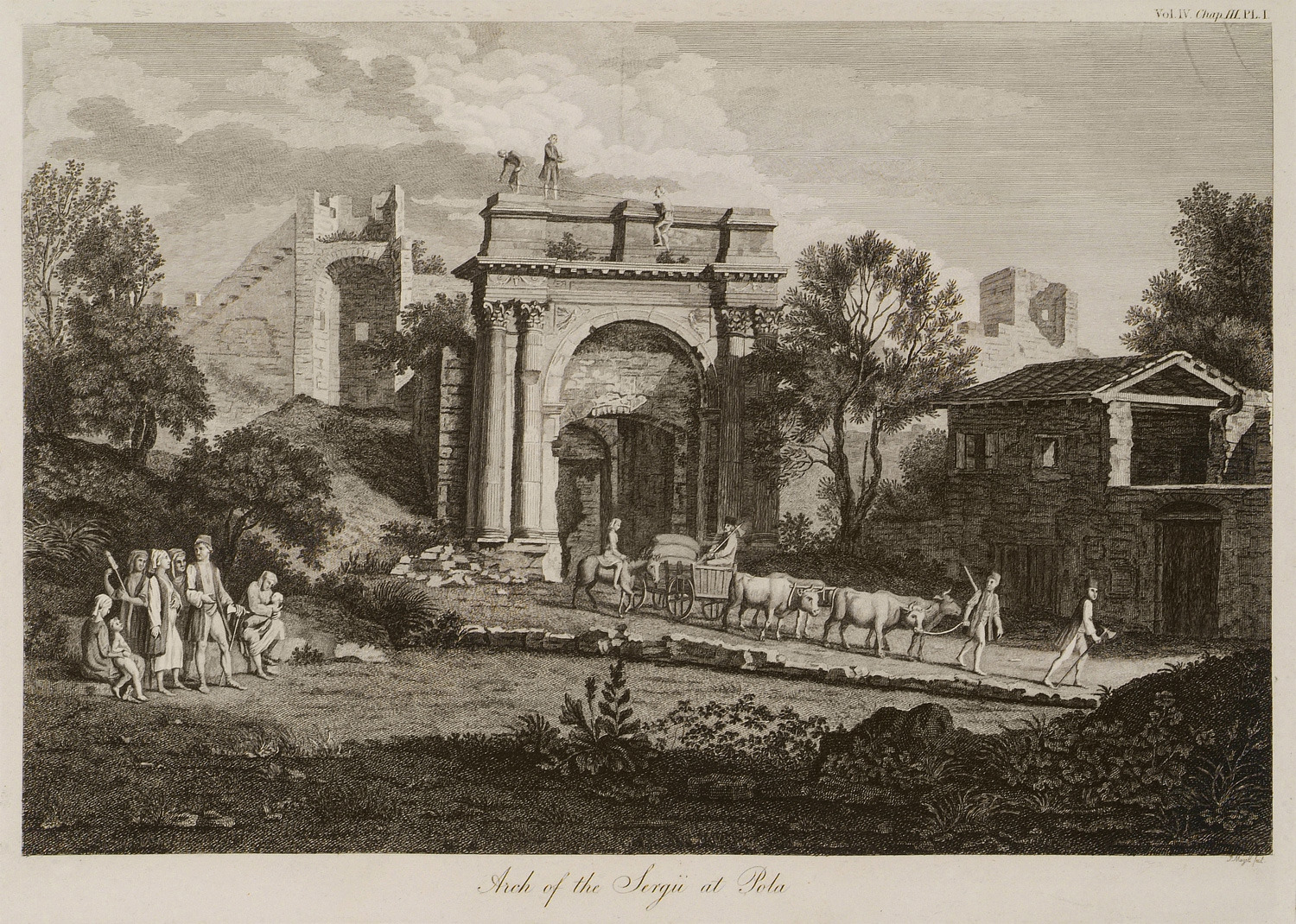
The Antiquities of Athens measured and delineated by James Stuart F.R.S. and F.S.A. and Nicholas Revett Painters and Αrchitects, vol. III (ed. Willey Reveley), London, John Nichols, 1794

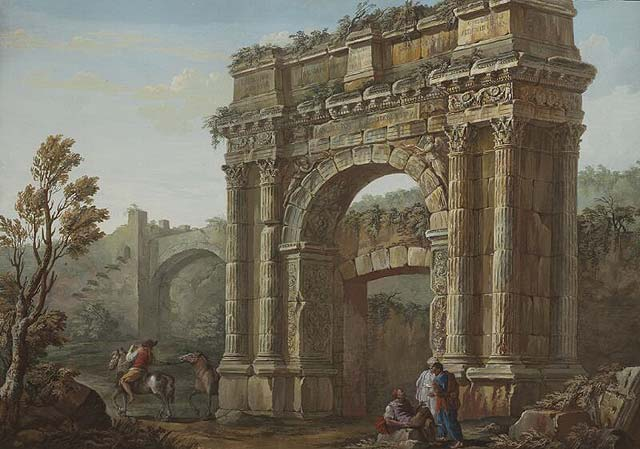
18th-century artwork by Charles-Louis Clérisseau showing the Arch of the Sergii and the original gateway (the Porta Aurea), which it was built against.

East view

== Bibliography ==
- Turner, J. (January 2, 1996). Grove Dictionary of Art. Oxford University Press. ISBN 0195170687.
