= Venetian Arsenal =

Shipbuilding factory of the Republic of Venice

- Arsenal
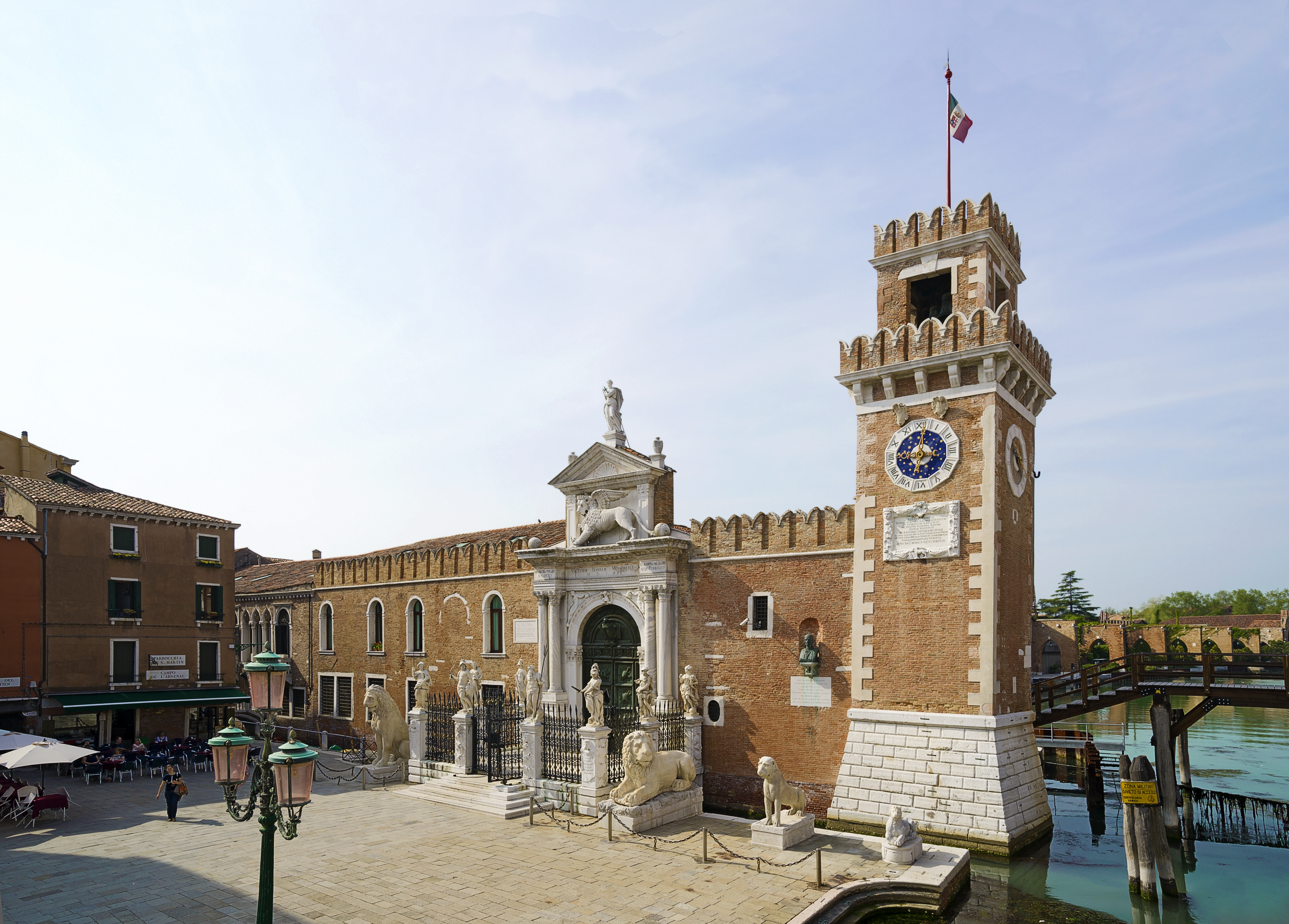
- The main gate at the Venetian Arsenal
- Opened: 1104
- Owner: Italian Republic
- Location: Venice, Italy
- Interactive map of Venetian Arsenal
- Coordinates: 45°26′07″N 12°21′11″E

The Venetian Arsenal (Italian: Arsenale di Venezia) is a complex of former shipyards and armories clustered together in the city of Venice in northern Italy. Owned by the state, the Arsenal was responsible for the bulk of the Venetian Republic's naval power from the Late Middle Ages to the early modern period. It was "one of the earliest large-scale industrial enterprises in history".

== Overview ==
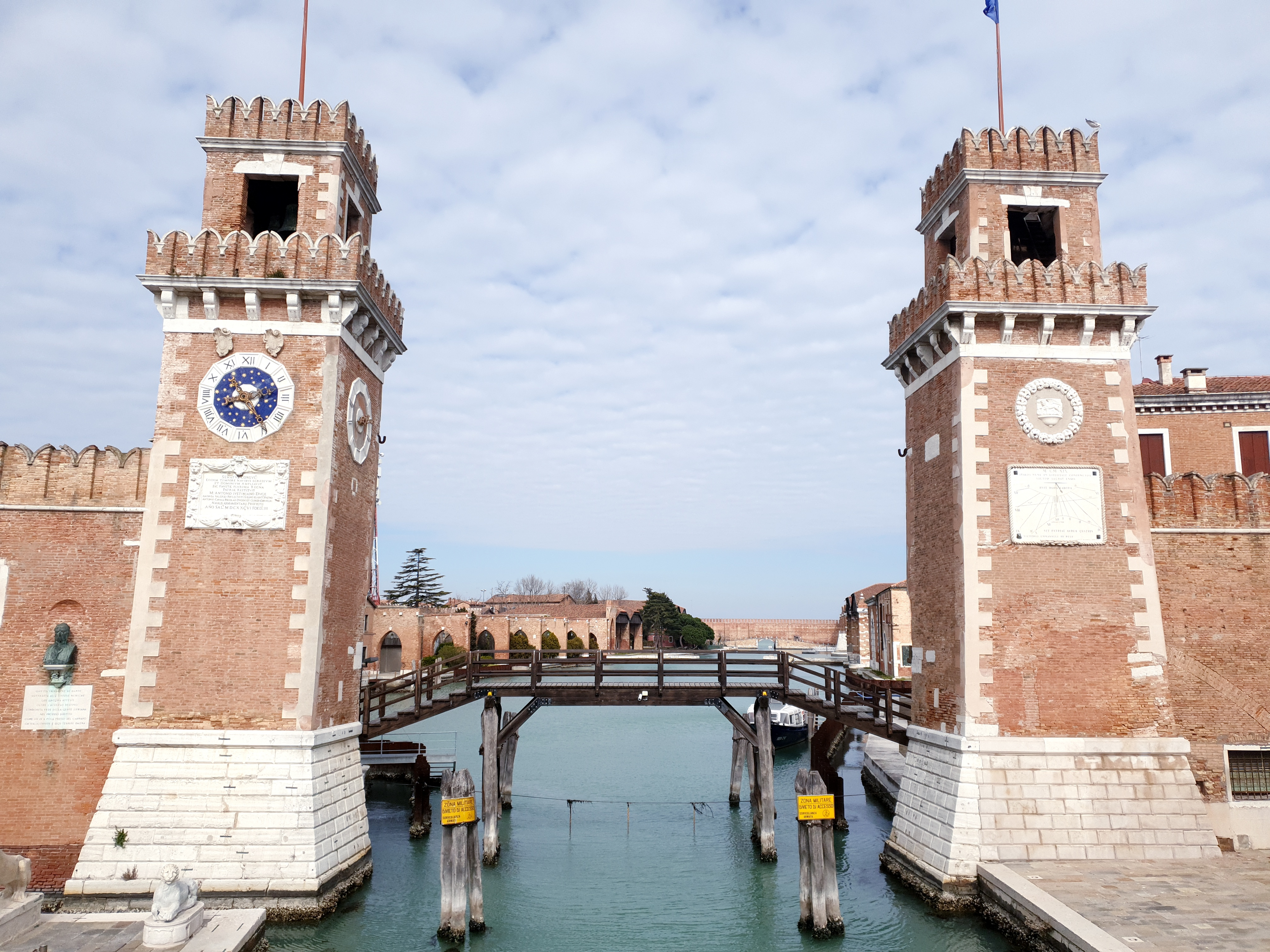
Venetian Arsenal towers

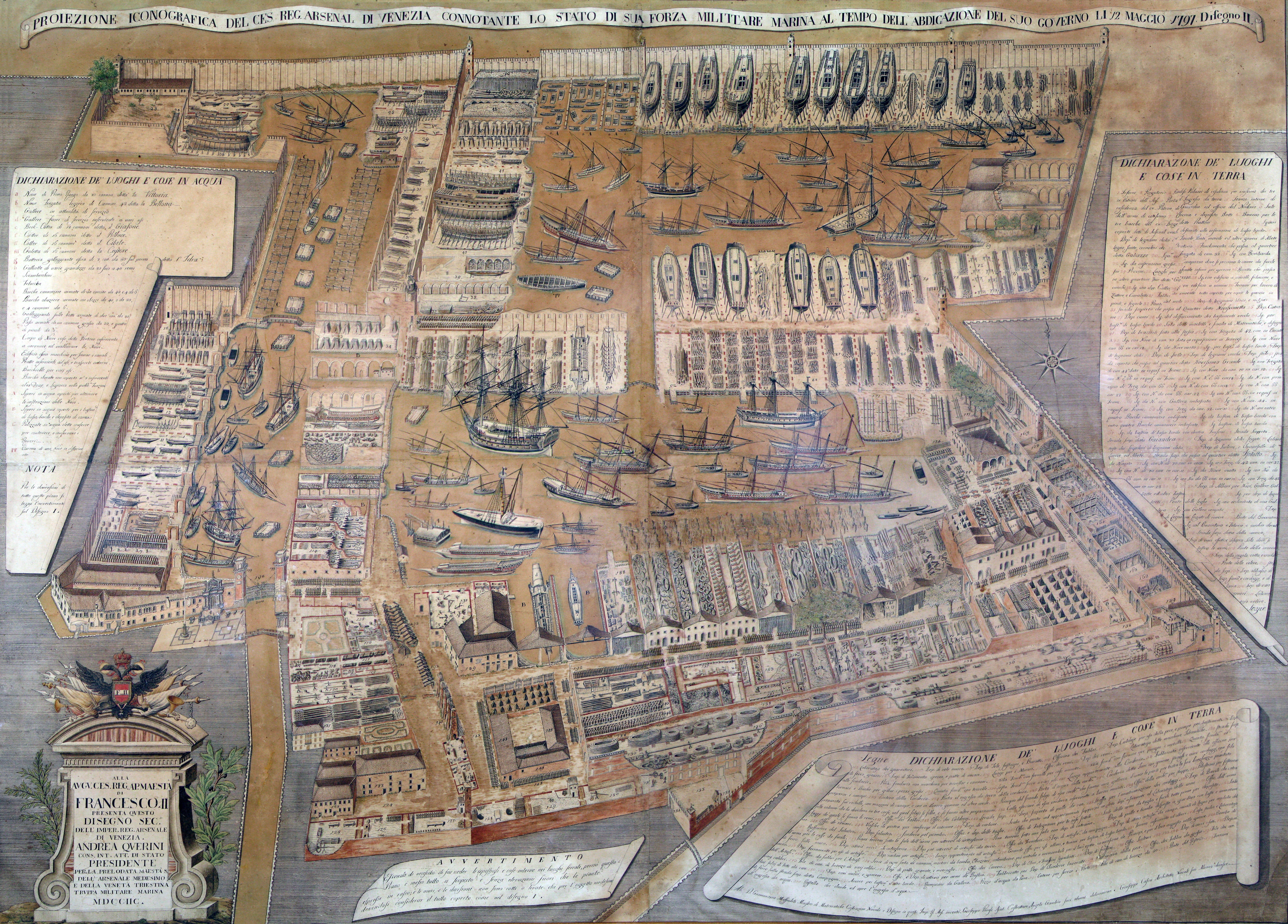
The Arsenal of Venice, 1797, by Gianmaria Maffioletti (Naval History Museum)

Construction of the Arsenal began around 1104, during Venice's republican era. It became the largest industrial complex in Europe before the Industrial Revolution, spanning an area of about 45 hectares (110 acres), or about 15 percent of Venice. Surrounded by a 2-mile (3.2 km) rampart, laborers and shipbuilders regularly worked within the Arsenal, building ships that sailed from the city's port. With high walls shielding the Arsenal from public view and guards protecting its perimeter, different areas of the Arsenal each produced a particular prefabricated ship part or other maritime implement, such as munitions, rope, and rigging. These parts could then be assembled into a ship in as little as one day. An exclusive forest owned by the Arsenal navy, in the Montello hills area of Veneto, provided the Arsenal's wood supply.

The Arsenal produced the majority of Venice's maritime trading vessels, which generated much of the city's economic wealth and power, lasting until the fall of the Venetian Republic to Napoleon in 1797. It is located in the Castello district of Venice, and it is now owned by the state.

== History ==
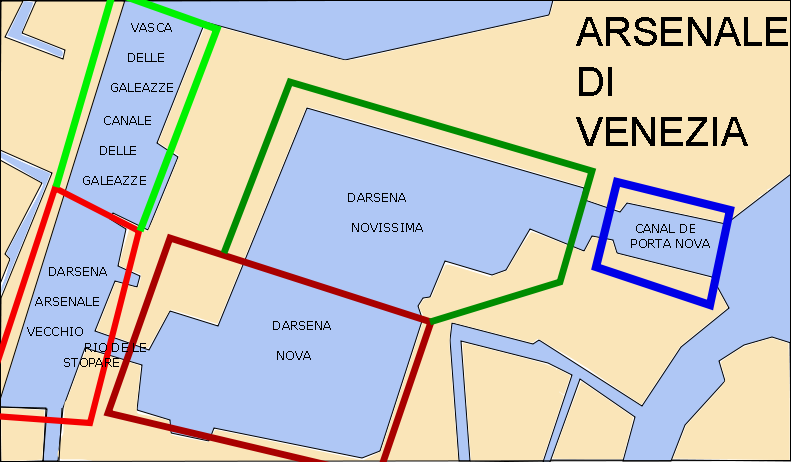
Plan of the Arsenal basins with their expansion phases, starting from the Old Arsenal, the New Arsenal (1305), the Newest Arsenal (1473), the Galeazze canal (1564) and the Porta Nova canal (1810).

The Byzantine-style establishment may have existed as early as the 8th century, though the present structure is usually said to have been begun in 1104 during the reign of Ordelafo Faliero, although there is no evidence for such a precise date. It definitely existed by the early 13th century.

Initially the state dockyard worked to maintain privately built naval ships, but in 1320 the Arsenale Nuovo (Italian: New Arsenal) was built, much larger than the original. It enabled all the state's navy and the larger merchant ships to be both constructed and maintained in one place. The Arsenal became an important center for rope manufacture, and housing for the Arsenal workers grew up outside its walls.

Venice developed methods of mass-producing warships in the Arsenal, including the frame-first system to replace the Roman hull-first practice. This new system was much faster and required less wood. At the peak of its efficiency in the early 16th century, the Arsenal employed some 16,000 people who apparently were able to produce nearly one ship each day, and could fit out, arm, and provision a newly built galley with standardized parts on a production-line basis not seen again until the Industrial Revolution.

The staff of the Arsenal, who were united by their distinct professional identity, also developed new firearms at an early date, beginning with bombards in the 1370s and numerous small arms for use against the Genoese a few years later. The muzzle velocity of handguns was improved beyond that of the crossbow, creating armor-piercing rounds. Arsenal-produced arms were also noteworthy for their multi-purpose utility; the Venetian condottieri leader, Bartolomeo Colleoni, is usually given credit as being the first to mount the Arsenal's new lighter-weight artillery on mobile carriages for field use.

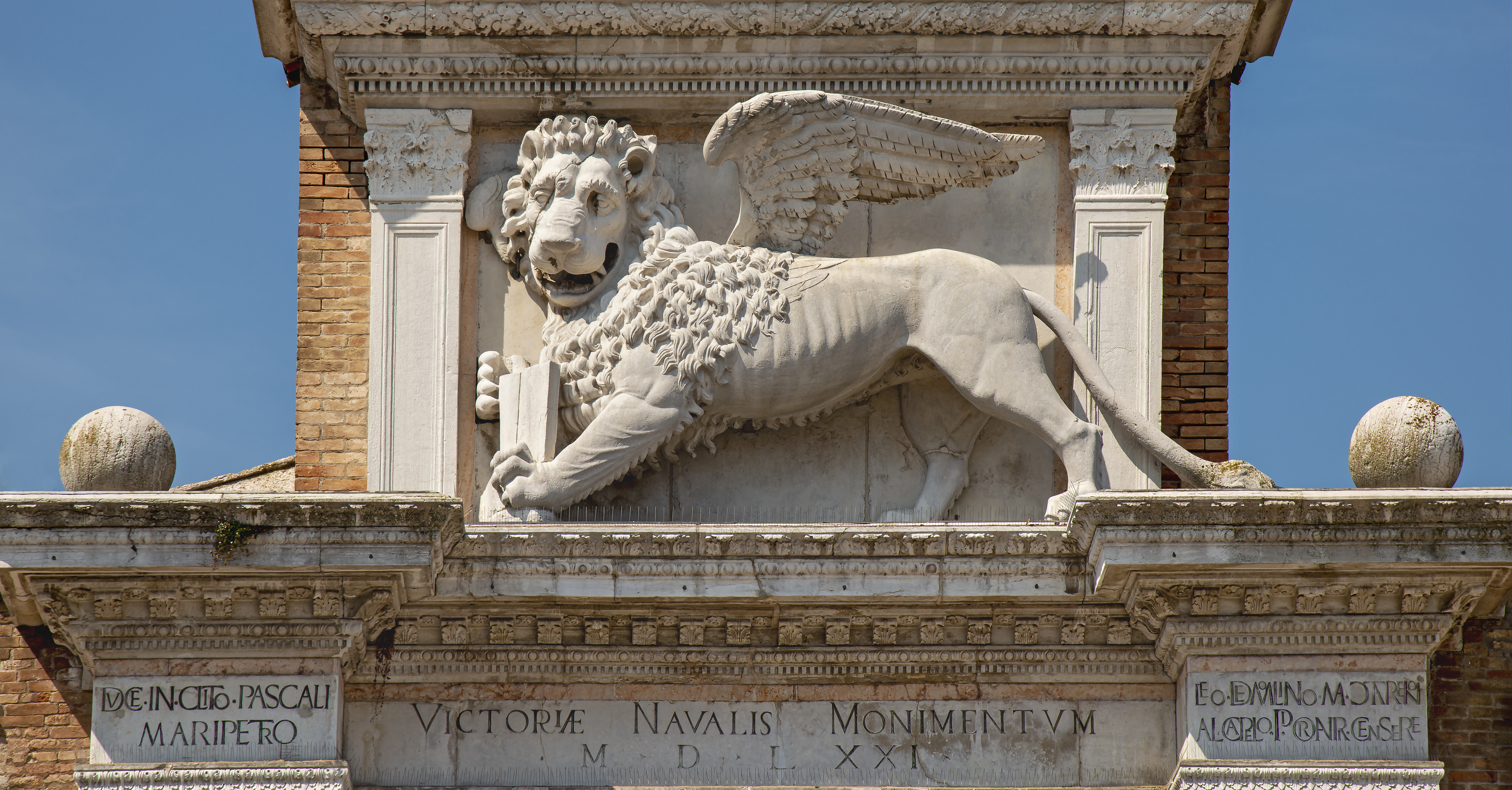
Stone Lion of Saint Mark above the main gate at the Arsenal

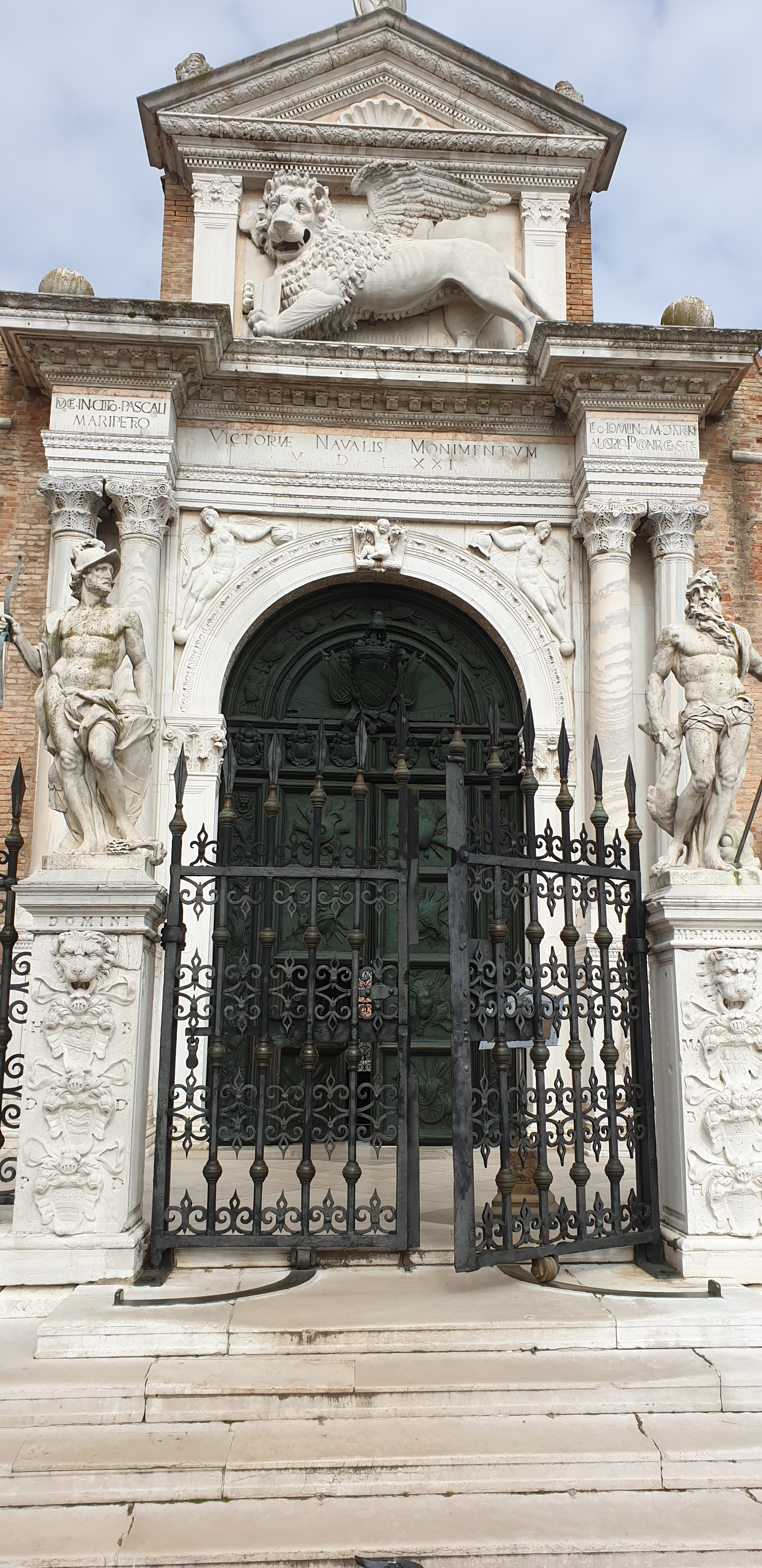
Venetian Arsenal main gate

The Arsenal's main gate, the Porta Magna, was built around 1460 and was one of the first works of Venetian Renaissance architecture. It was based on the Roman Arch of the Sergii, a triumphal arch in Pula in Istria, now in Croatia but then Venetian territory. It was perhaps built by Antonio Gambello from a design by Jacopo Bellini. Two marble lions looted from Piraeus near Athens, situated beside it were added in 1687. One of the lions, known as the Piraeus Lion, has notable runic defacements that were probably carved into it by Scandinavian mercenaries in the 11th century.

In the late 16th century, the Arsenal's designers experimented with larger ships as platforms for heavy naval guns. The largest was the galleass, already used at the Battle of Lepanto (1571) against the Ottoman Turks, and developed from the old merchanting "great galley". It was huge, propelled by both sails and oars, with guns mounted on wheeled carriages along the sides in the modern fashion. It was slow and unwieldy in battle, however, and few were ever built. The galleon, also developed at the Arsenal, was an armed sailing ship, a slimmer version of the merchant "round ship". It was useful in major naval battles, but not in the small bays and off the extensive lee shores of the Dalmatian coast.

Significant parts of the Arsenal were destroyed under Napoleonic rule, and later rebuilt to enable the Arsenal's present use as a naval base. It is also used as a research center and an exhibition venue during the Venice Biennale, and is home to a historic boat preservation center.

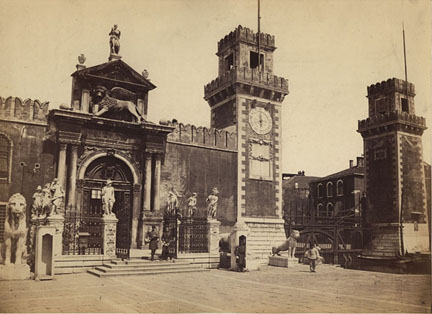
Entrance to the Arsenal ca. 1860–70. Photo by Carlo Ponti

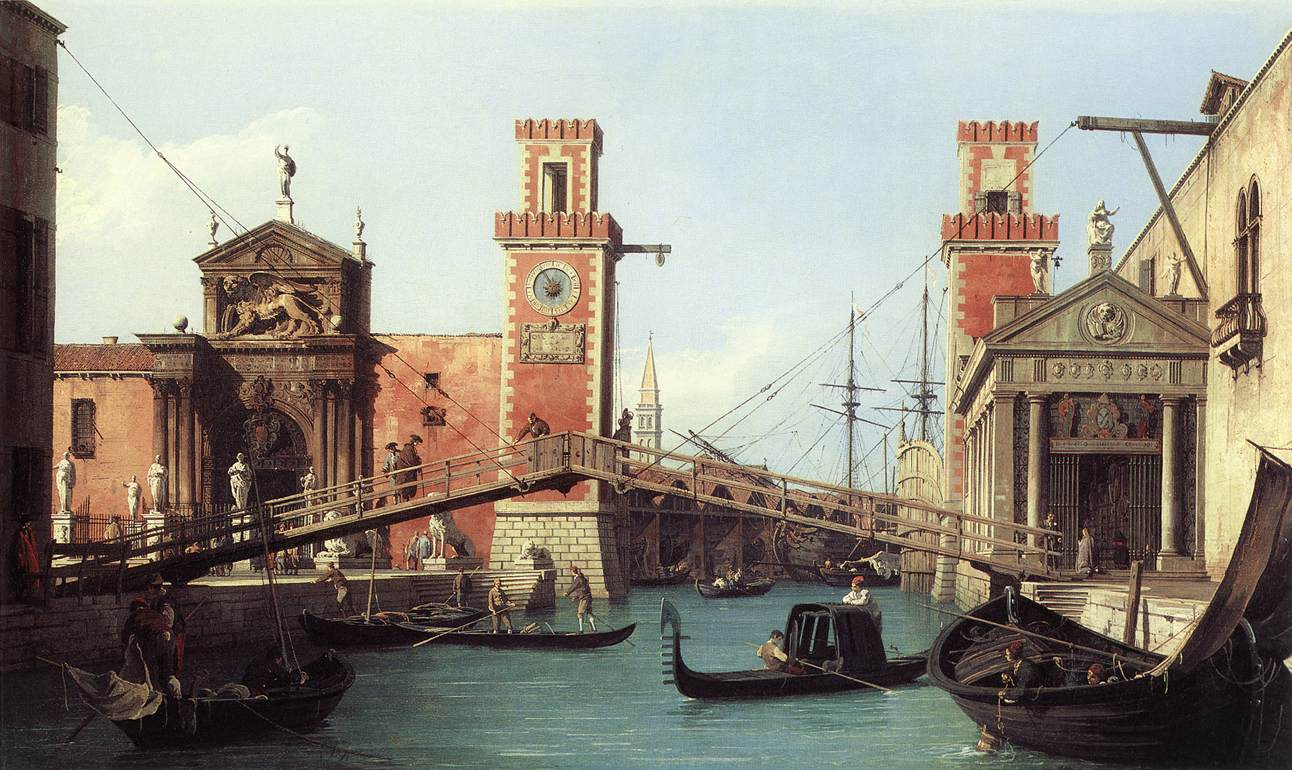
View of the Entrance to the Arsenal by Canaletto, 1732

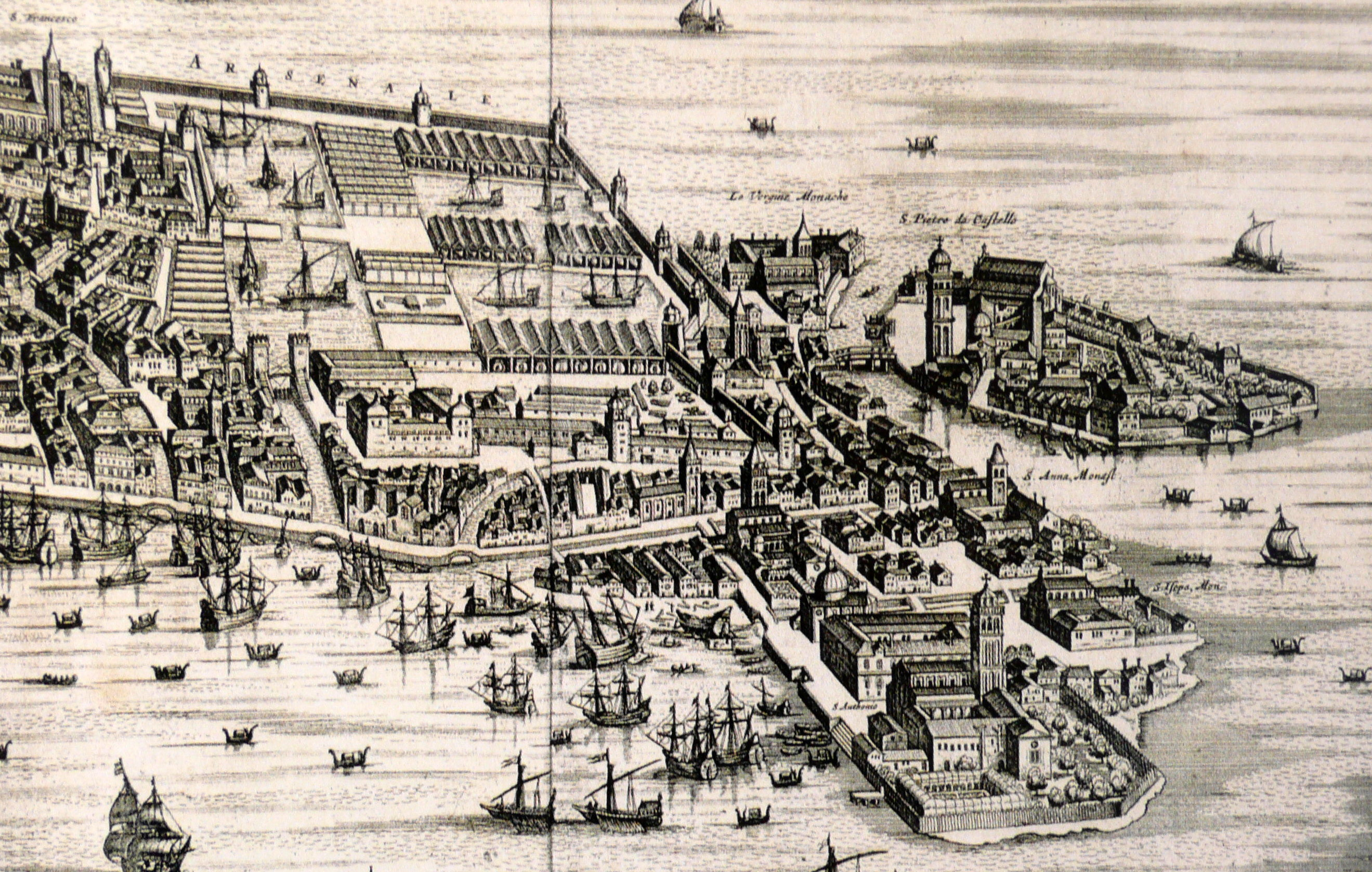
Venetian Arsenal, 1724 engraving by Joan Blaeu

== Mass production ==
The Venetian Arsenal's ability to mass-produce galleys on an almost assembly-line process was unique for its time and resulted in possibly the single largest industrial complex in Europe prior to the Industrial Revolution. So much so, that it was mentioned in Dante's Inferno:

As in the Arsenal of the Venetians
Boils in winter the tenacious pitch
To smear their unsound vessels over again
For sail they cannot; and instead thereof
One makes his vessel new, and one recaulks
The ribs of that which many a voyage has made
One hammers at the prow, one at the stern
This one makes oars and that one cordage twists
Another mends the mainsail and the mizzen…

The Arsenal's capacity for production was rare in a time when "most of Europe had no manufacturing abilities more efficient than the guild system, the slow and tradition-bound way craftsmen had of passing on skills to their sons or apprentices while monopolizing production and sale of craft pieces in a given region... The Arsenal was something different, a harbinger of future times."

The Venetian Arsenal was not the mass production facility that it was to become until about 1320 with the creation of the Arsenale Nuovo. The Arsenale Nuovo was simply a larger and more efficient version of the original. Prior to this time the Arsenal had served mainly as a place to maintain privately built ships. With the creation of the Arsenale Nuovo, and the development and introduction of the Great Galley, the Venetian Arsenal would start to take on its industrial form. The invention of the Great Galley itself is significant because they were able to be built frame-first. This process used less timber than the earlier hull-first building system, resulting in much faster build times. This was crucial to the process that would lead to the Arsenal becoming a mass-production center. By the 16th century, the Arsenal had become the most powerful and efficient shipbuilding enterprise in the world. Not only did it supply ships, rigging, and other nautical supplies, it was also a major munitions depot for the Venetian navy and was capable of outfitting and producing fully equipped merchant or naval vessels at the rate of one per day.

In the rest of Europe the production of a similar sized vessel could often take months. This large production capacity was a result of the massive number of people that the Arsenal employed, almost 16,000, and the streamlining of production within the Arsenal itself. Production was divided into three main stages: framing, planking and cabins, and final assembly. Each stage employed its own workers who specialized in that particular stage of production as well as using standardized parts to produce an almost assembly-line process. The Arsenal often kept up to 100 galleys in different stages of production and maintenance. That way, once a galley was launched, another could be immediately put into the finishing stages of production. The layout of the Arsenal itself was modified to enable minimal handling of materials during the stages of production. The Arsenal also saw the use of standardized, interchangeable parts.

One revolutionary aspect of the Arsenal was its employment of the moving assembly line. The galleys, through the use of a canal, were moved along during their stages of construction, allowing them to be brought to the materials and workers, instead of the materials and workers going to the galley itself. This assembly approach was repeated in the rest of the world only starting from the early 20th century when Ransom E. Olds began using the modern assembly line, which was later changed into a moving assembly line by Henry Ford.

== Galileo ==
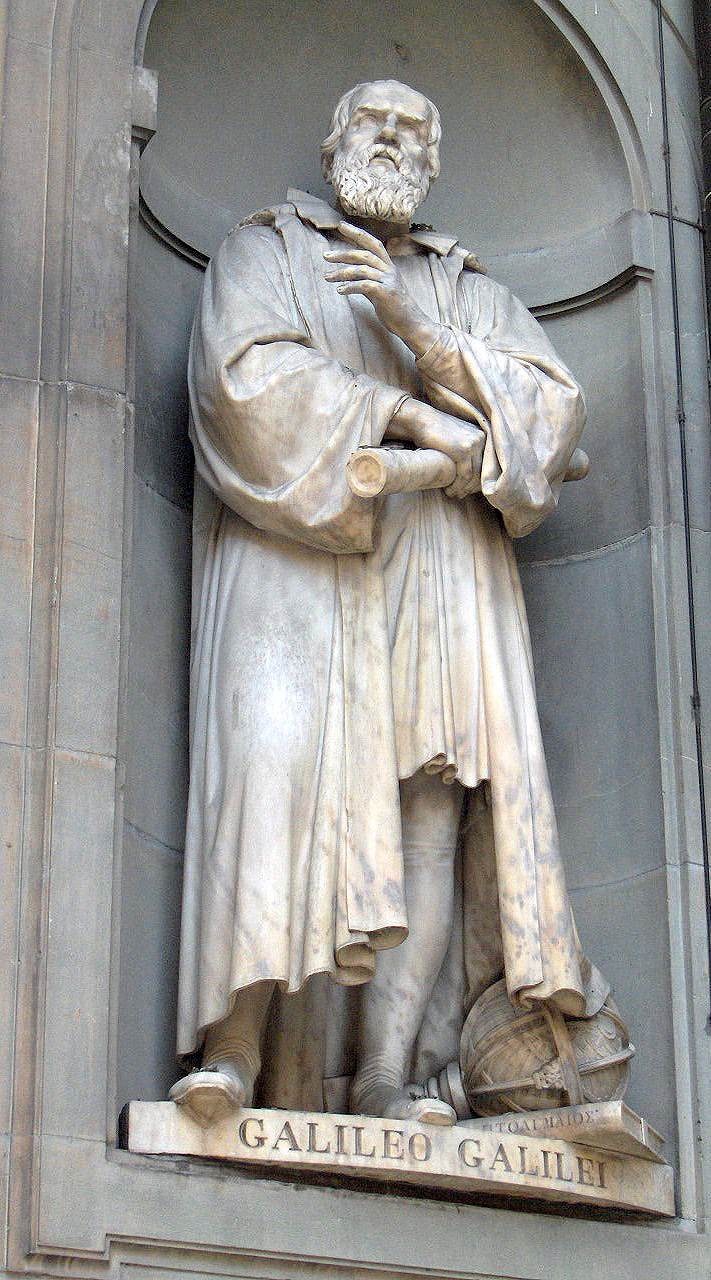
Statue of Galileo Galilei

In 1593, Galileo became a consultant to the Arsenal, advising military engineers and instrument makers and helping to solve shipbuilders' problems, many of them relating to matters of ballistics. He was also responsible for creating some major innovations in the production and logistics of the Arsenal. As a result of his interactions with the Arsenal, Galileo published a book later in his life addressing a new field of modern science, that concerned with the strength and resistance of materials. This science largely saw its roots in the knowledge of the shipwrights of the Venetian Arsenal. It is also supposed that Galileo's initial visits to the Arsenal were as a result of his initiative to further investigate Aristotle's questions concerning shipbuilding and navigation, found in the Mechanical Questions of Aristotle. As a result of these investigations, which were pursued by observing the work of the shipwrights, Galileo was asked to help in resolving a specific problem with the rowing units of the galleys. As a result of his study of Aristotle, and in particular Question 4 regarding the propulsion of ships by oar, Galileo was able to produce a response to this question and ended up becoming a major source of information for the shipbuilders of the Arsenal concerning matters of rowing, instruments, and ballistics.

== Venice's naval power ==
Venice's wealth and power rested in its ability to control trade in the Mediterranean. This would not have been possible without an extremely large navy and merchant force. By 1450, over 3,000 Venetian merchant ships were in operation, both as supply ships for Venetian merchants and as warships for the Venetian navy. The fleet required constant maintenance and outfitting. The Venetian Arsenal was not only able to function as a major shipyard, but was also responsible for these routine maintenance stops that most Venetian galleys required. This required financing, for which the Venetian government spent almost 10% of its revenues. This naval power resulted in the domination of Mediterranean commerce. Venice's leading families, largely merchants and noblemen, were responsible for creating some of the grandest palaces and employing some of the most famous artists ever known. This opulence and wealth would not have been possible without the naval force constructed by the Arsenal. With the creation of the Great Galley and the mass production capacity of the Arsenal, "the fleets of Venice were the basis for the greatest commercial power the European world had yet seen".

== Current use ==
After years of disuse and neglect, parts of the Venetian Arsenal complex have been modernized and repurposed to serve as the operations centre for Venice's MOSE Project, a flood defence system intended to protect the Venetian Lagoon from tidal flooding.

== Other arsenals ==
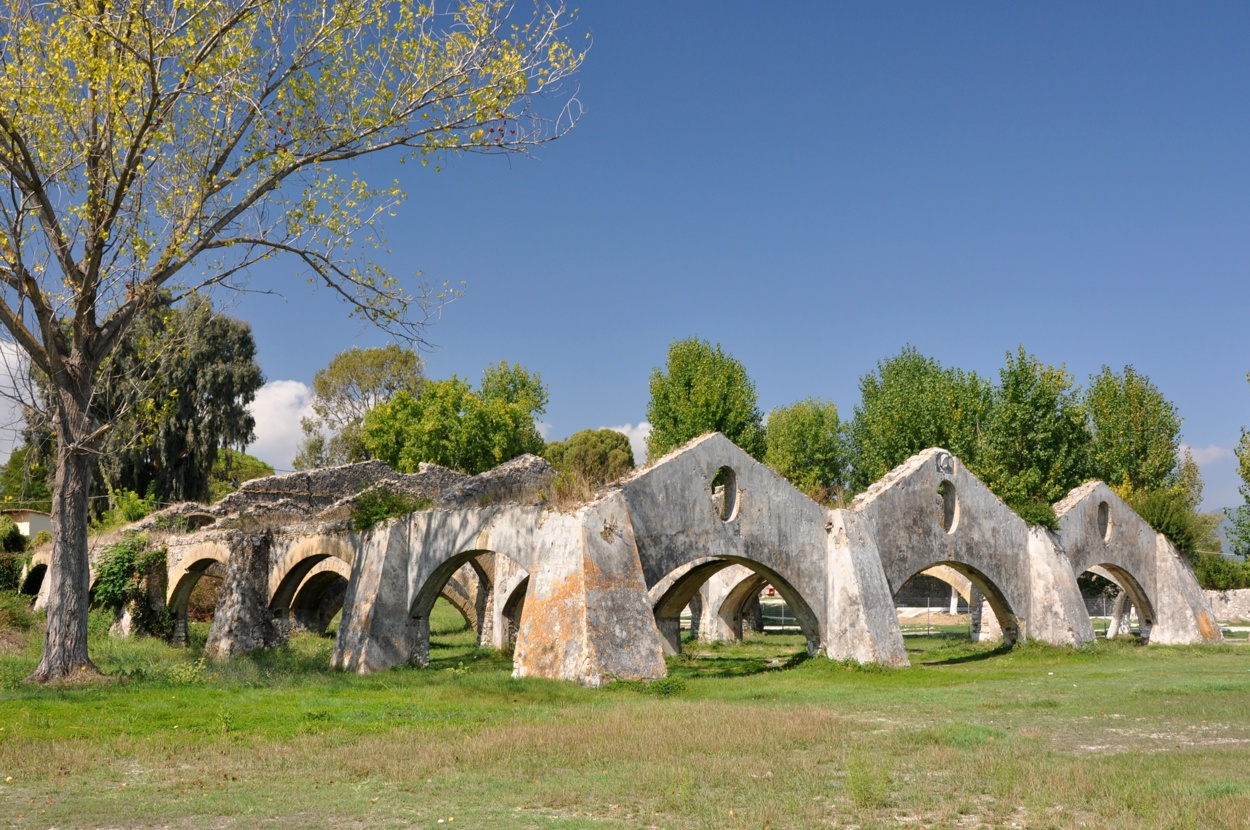
The Venetian Arsenal at Gouvia Bay, Corfu

Venice built also a network of Venetian arsenals, serving primarily the purpose of repair, and naval stations in Greece, including shipyards in the Aegean Sea, Epirus, the Peloponnese and the Kingdom of Candia (modern Crete). Such locations included Corfu, Methoni, Koroni, Chalkis, Preveza, Chania and Heraklion.

== See also ==
- Venetian arsenal, Gouvia
- List of buildings and structures in Venice

Preceded by St Mark's Basilica	Venice landmarks Venetian Arsenal	Succeeded by Bridge of Sighs
