= Piraeus Lion =

Greek statue in Venice

- Leone del Pireo (Italian)
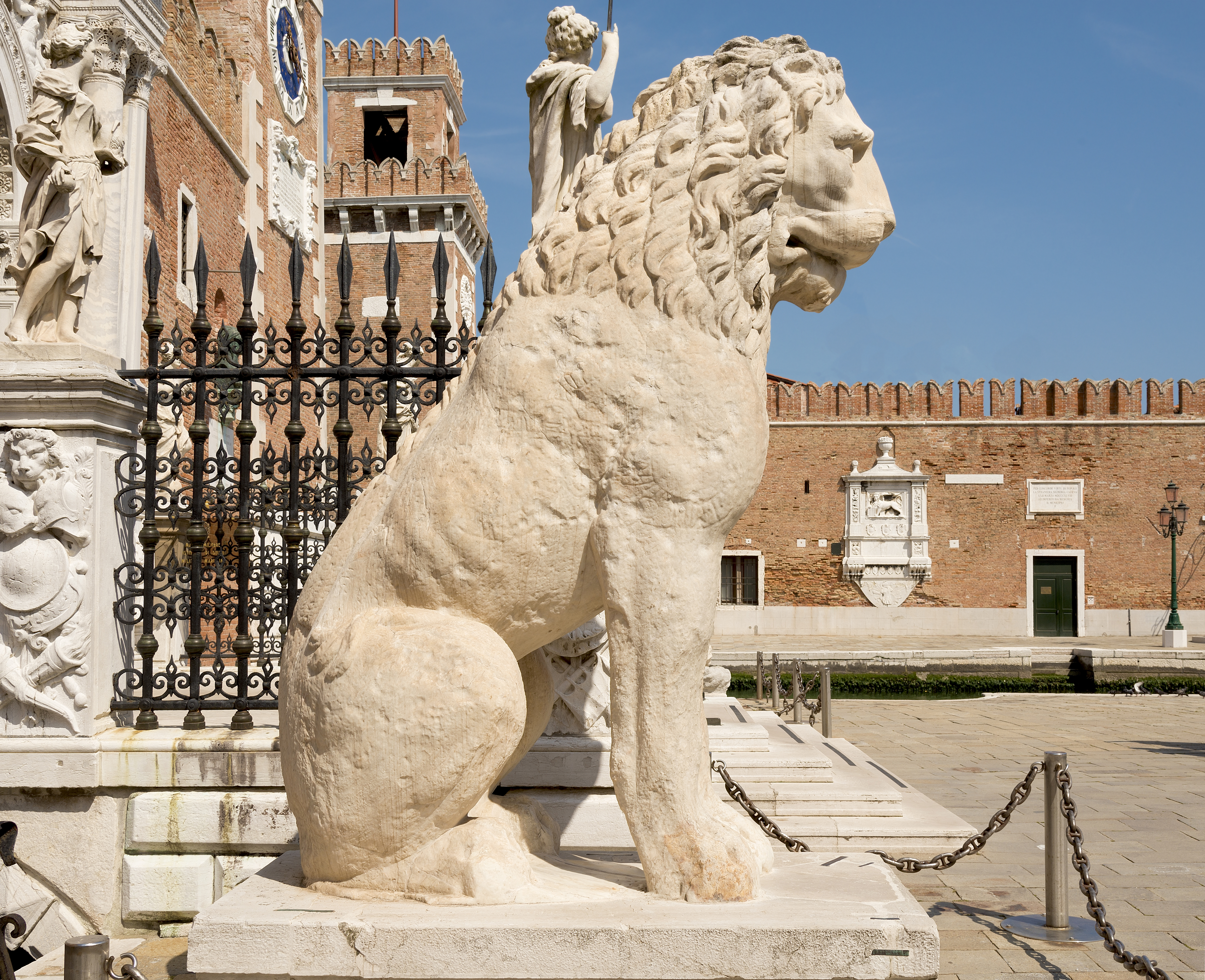
- The Piraeus Lion at the Venetian Arsenal.
- Artist: Unknown
- Year: c. 360 BC; 2386 years ago
- Medium: Marble
- Dimensions: 3 m (9 ft)
- Location: Venice, Italy; 45°26′05″N 12°20′59″E

The Piraeus Lion (Italian: Leone del Pireo; Norwegian: Pireusløven) is one of four lion statues on display at the Venetian Arsenal, Italy, where it was displayed as a symbol of Venice's patron saint, Saint Mark. The statue is made of white marble and stands some 3 m (9 ft.) high. It is particularly noteworthy for two lengthy runic inscriptions on its shoulders and flanks; these were likely carved by Scandinavians sometime in the 11th century AD.

== History ==
It was originally located in Piraeus harbour of Athens. It was looted by Venetian naval commander Francesco Morosini in 1687 as plunder taken in the war against the Ottoman Empire, during which the Venetians captured Athens and Morosini's cannons caused damage to the Parthenon that was matched only by his subsequent sack of the city. Copies of the statue can also be seen at the Piraeus Archaeological Museum and the Swedish History Museum in Stockholm.

The lion was originally sculpted in about 360 BC, and became a famous landmark in Piraeus, Athens, having stood there since the 1st or 2nd century AD. Its prominence was such that the port eventually became referred to in Italian as Porto Leone ("Lion Port") as the port's original name ceased to be used. It is depicted in a sitting pose, with a hollow throat and the mark of a pipe (now lost) running down its back; this suggests that it was at some point used as a fountain. This is consistent with the description of the statue from the 1670s, which said that water flowed from the lion's mouth into a cistern at its feet.

In the second half of the 11th century, two runic inscriptions were carved onto the lion. The runes are carved in the shape of an elaborate lindworm dragon-headed scroll, in much the same style as on runestones in Scandinavia. According to Erik Brate's translation of the runes, they state they were carved by "suiar", or the Swedes. The Vikings who carved the runes on the lion could have been Varangians, mercenaries in the service of the Byzantine (Eastern Roman) Emperor, or Vikings who travelled from Scandinavia around Europe’s Atlantic coastline.

== Inscriptions and translations ==
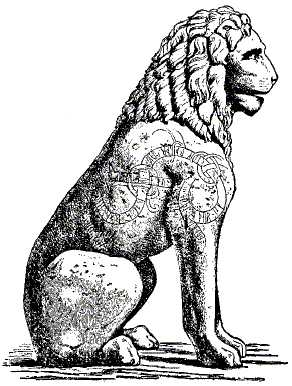
Piraeus Lion drawing of curved lindworm. The runes on the lion tell of Swedish Varangians, mercenaries in the service of the Byzantine (Eastern Roman) Emperor.

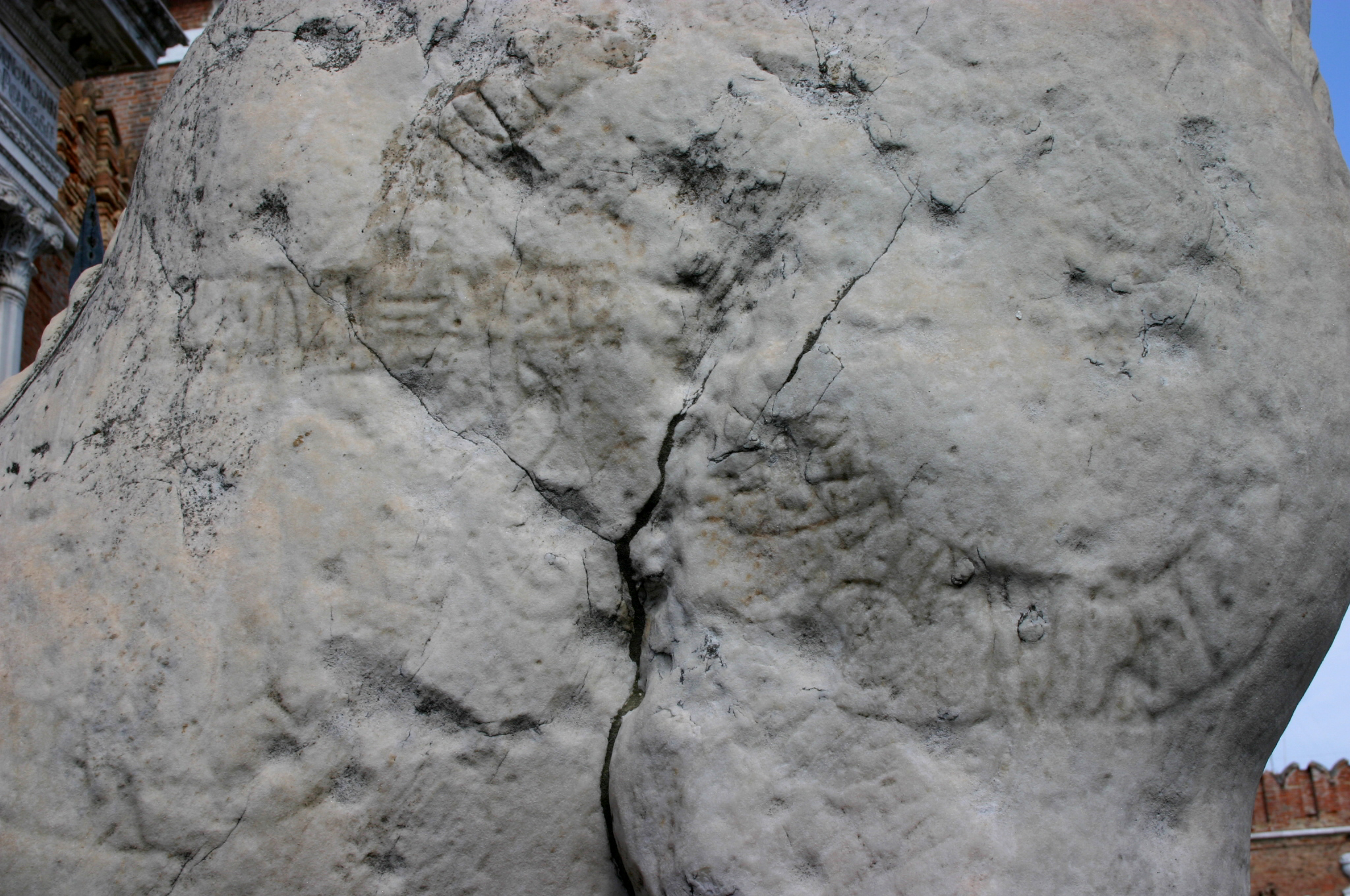
Photo of inscription on right flank of lion (with contrast exaggerated to make inscription more visible).

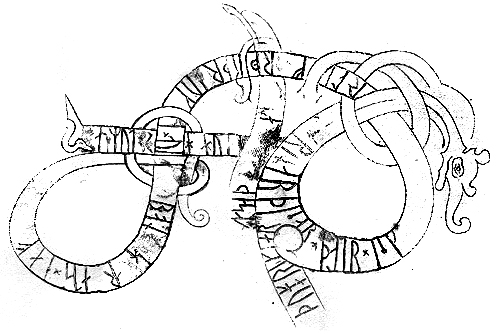
Drawings of the inscription

The inscriptions were not recognised as runes until the Swedish diplomat Johan David Åkerblad identified them at the end of the 18th century. They are in the shape of a lindworm (a flightless dragon with serpentine body and two or no legs) and were first translated in the mid-19th century by Carl Christian Rafn, the Secretary of the Kongelige Nordiske Oldskrift-Selskab (Royal Society of Nordic Antiquaries). The inscriptions are heavily eroded due to weathering, making many of the individual runes barely legible. This has required translators to reconstruct some of the runes, filling in the blanks to determine what words they represented.

There have been several attempts to decipher and translate the text. Below follow Rafn's early attempt (1854) and Eric Brate's attempt (1914), which is considered to be the most successful one.

== Rafn's translation ==
Rafn's attempt is as follows, with the legible letters shown in bold and the reconstructed ones unbolded:

Right side of the lion:

- ASMUDR : HJU : RU**NAR : ÞISAR : ÞAIR : ISK**IR : AUK: ÞU**RLIFR : ÞURÞR : AUK : IVA**R : AT : **BON : H**ARADS : H**AF**A : **ÞUAT : GRIK**IAR : UF : H**UGSA**ÞU : AUK : B**A**NAÞU :
  - Asmund cut these runes with Asgeir and Thorleif, Thord and Ivar, at the request of Harold the Tall, though the Greeks considered about and forbade it.

Left side of the lion:

- **HAKUN : VAN: ÞI**R : ULFR : A**UK : ASM**U**D**R : A**UK : A**U**RN : HAFN : ÞESA : ÞIR : M**E**N : L**AG**ÞU : A : U**K **: HARAD**R **: HA**F**I : UF IABUTA : UPRA**R**S**TAR : **V**EGNA : **GRI**K**IAÞIÞS : VARÞ : DALK**R **: N**A**U**ÞUGR : I : F**IAR**I : LAÞUM : EGIL : VAR : **I** : FARU : MIÞ : RAGNARR : TIL : RU**MAN**IU **. . . . AUK : A**RMENIU :
  - Hakon with Ulf and Asmund and Örn conquered this port. These men and Harold Hafi imposed a heavy fine on account of the revolt of the Greek people. Dalk is detained captive in far lands. Egil is gone on an expedition with Ragnar into Romania and Armenia.

Some have tried to trace Harald Hardrada's name on the inscription, but the time it was carved does not coincide with his time in the service of the emperor.

== Erik Brate's translation ==
Erik Brate's interpretation from 1914 is considered to be the most successful one.

hiuku þir hilfninks milum hna en i hafn þesi þir min eoku runar at haursa bunta kuþan a uah riþu suiar þita linu fur raþum kul uan farin - tri(n)kiar ristu runar [a rikan strin]k hiuku þair isk[il-] [þu]rlifr - litu auka ui[i þir a] roþrslanti b[yku] - a sun iuk runar þisar. ufr uk - li st[intu] a[t haursa] kul] uan farn	They cut him down in the midst of his forces. But in the harbor the men cut runes by the sea in memory of Horsi, a good warrior. The Swedes set this on the lion. He went his way with good counsel, gold he won in his travels. The warriors cut runes, hewed them in an ornamental scroll. Æskell (Áskell) [and others] and Þorlæifʀ (Þorleifr) had them well cut, they who lived in Roslagen. [N. N.] son of [N. N.] cut these runes. Ulfʀ (Úlfr) and [N. N.] colored them in memory of Horsi. He won gold in his travels.

== See also ==
- Berezan' Runestone
- Greece Runestones
- Italy Runestones
- List of public art in Venice
- Runic inscriptions in Hagia Sophia
- Chinese guardian lions

== Literature ==
- Sven B. F. Jansson, "Pireuslejonets runor", Nordisk Tidskrift för vetenskap konst och industri, utgiven av Letterstedtska Föreningen. Stockholm (1984).
- Andrea C. Snow, "Transmuted: Reconciling the Medieval Scandinavian Marking of the Piraeus Lion." Viator 53, no. 2 (2022): 179–214.
