= Dissolution of the Holy Roman Empire =

- The final stage of the Holy Roman Empire, before the French Revolutionary Wars
- Date: 6 August 1806; 220 years ago
- Location: Holy Roman Empire
- Participants: Francis II, Holy Roman Emperor; The Princes of the Holy Roman Empire
- Outcome: Dissolution of the Holy Roman Empire; succeeded chiefly by the short-lived Napoleonic Confederation of the Rhine and then the Habsburg-Lorraine-led German Confederation; The House of Habsburg-Lorraine continues to rule as Emperors of Austria and Kings of Hungary; The German Question, concerning the possibility of German unification; eventually resulting in the formation of the German Empire

The Holy Roman Empire was dissolved on the 6th of August in 1806, when the last Holy Roman Emperor, Francis II of the House of Habsburg-Lorraine, abdicated his title and released all Imperial states and officials from their oaths and obligations to the empire. Since the Middle Ages, the Holy Roman Empire had been recognized by Western Europeans as the legitimate continuation of the ancient Roman Empire due to its emperors having been proclaimed as Roman emperors by the papacy. Through this Roman legacy, the Holy Roman Emperors claimed to be universal monarchs whose jurisdiction extended beyond their empire's formal borders to all of Christian Europe and beyond. The decline of the Holy Roman Empire was a long and drawn-out process lasting centuries. The formation of the first modern sovereign territorial states in the 16th and 17th centuries, which brought with it the idea that jurisdiction corresponded to actual territory governed, threatened the ostensibly universal nature of the Holy Roman Empire.

The Holy Roman Empire by the time of the 18th century was widely regarded by contemporaries, both inside and outside the empire, as a highly "irregular" monarchy and "sick," having an "unusual" form of government. The empire lacked both a central standing army and a central treasury and its monarchs, formally elective rather than hereditary, could not exercise effective central control. Even then, most contemporaries believed that the empire could be revived and modernized. For example, the Reichstag passed the Imperial Recess as late as 1803.

The Holy Roman Empire finally began its true terminal decline during and after its involvement in the French Revolutionary Wars and the Napoleonic Wars. Although the empire defended itself quite well initially, war with France and Napoleon proved catastrophic. In 1804, Napoleon proclaimed himself as the Emperor of the French, which Francis II responded to by proclaiming himself the Emperor of Austria, in addition to already being the Holy Roman Emperor, an attempt at maintaining parity between France and Austria while also illustrating that the Holy Roman title outranked them both. Austria's defeat at the Battle of Austerlitz in December 1805 and the secession of a large number of Francis II's German vassals in July 1806 to form the Confederation of the Rhine, a French satellite state, effectively meant the end of the Holy Roman Empire. The abdication in August 1806, combined with a dissolution of the entire Imperial hierarchy and its institutions, was seen as necessary to prevent the possibility of Napoleon proclaiming himself Holy Roman Emperor, something which would have reduced Francis II to Napoleon's vassal.

Reactions to the empire's dissolution ranged from indifference to despair. The populace of Vienna, capital of the Habsburg monarchy, were horrified at the loss of the empire. Many of Francis II's former subjects questioned the legality of his actions; though his abdication was agreed to be perfectly legal, the dissolution of the empire and the release of all its vassals were seen as beyond the emperor's authority. As such, many of the empire's princes and subjects refused to accept that the empire was gone, with some commoners going so far as to believe that news of its dissolution was a plot by their local authorities. In Germany, the dissolution was widely compared to the ancient and legendary Fall of Troy and some associated the end of the Holy Roman Empire with the end times and the apocalypse.

== Background ==
=== Ideology of the Holy Roman Empire ===
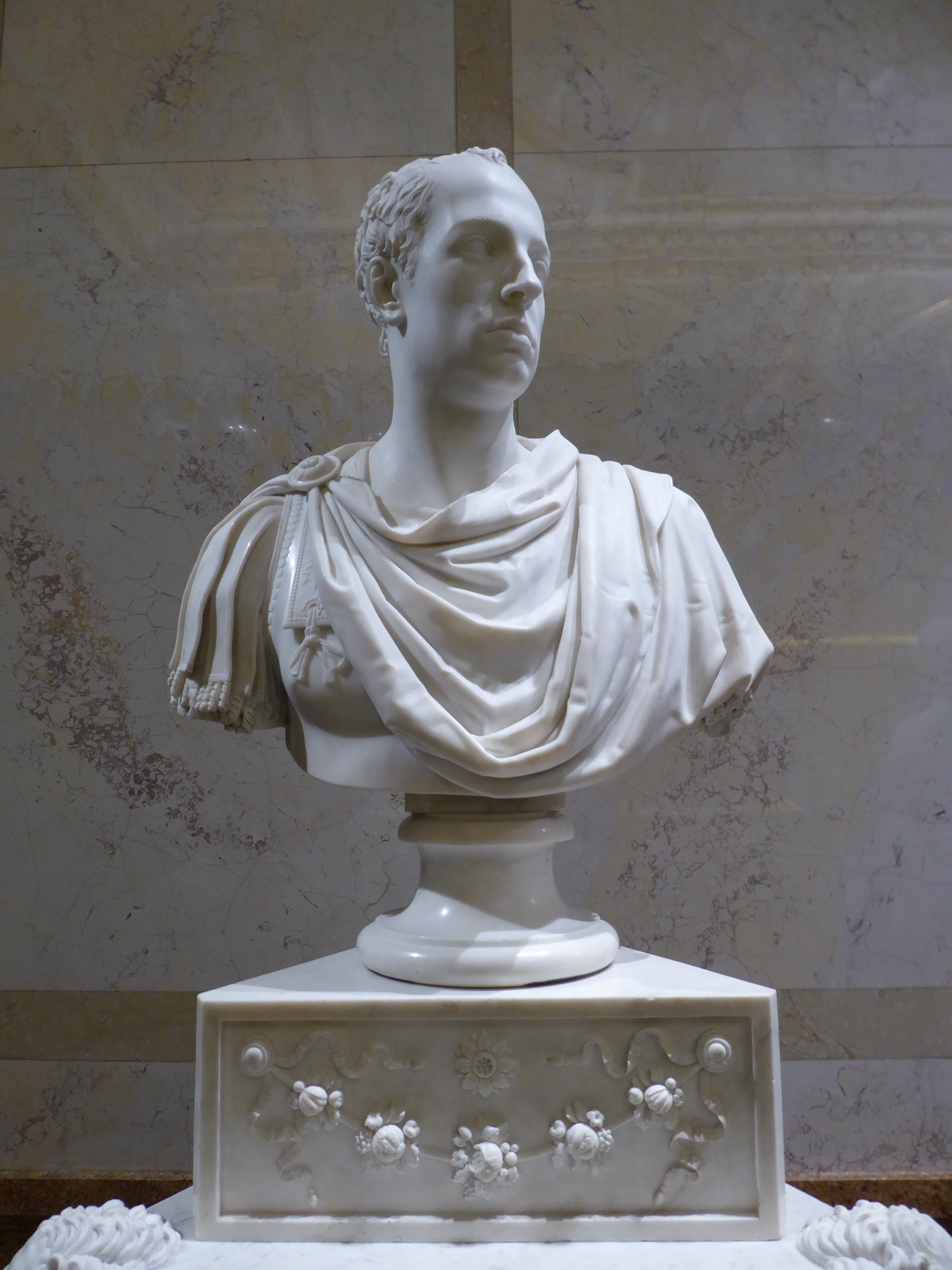
Marble bust of the final Holy Roman Emperor, Francis II, in a style inspired by ancient Roman marble busts

The defining characteristic of the Holy Roman Empire was the idea that the Holy Roman Emperor represented the leading monarch in Europe and that their empire was the one true continuation of the Roman Empire of Antiquity, through the preservation of legal, cultural, and political institutions, as well as by proclamation by the popes in Rome. It was the firm belief of its emperors that they were the ultimate temporal authority in Christendom and although they had formally recognized the sultans of Ottoman Empire as emperors in 1606 and the rulers of Russia as emperors in 1742, these recognitions were conditional on the fact that the Holy Roman Emperor was always pre-eminent. The pre-eminence of the emperor was an expression of the idea that the Holy Roman Empire, theoretically, extended over all Christians in a universal manner. Because the empire after its resurrection in 800 AD did not in practice rule over all of Christian Europe, this claim was generally recognized de jure, but never de facto. Even Byzantine emperors in the East periodically recognized the Romanitas of the Holy Roman Empire, referring to the Holy Roman Emperors as the "August Emperor of the Romans." Imperial authority rested not on the emperor's own crown lands (though there were large crown lands in the 18th and 19th centuries) but on the emperor's role as the highest secular ruler in the world and a champion and advocate of the Catholic Church. The lack of a defined capital and consistent crown lands reinforced the idea that the imperial title was universal as it was not necessarily associated with any one area.

Throughout its long existence, the Holy Roman Empire was a central element in international relations in Europe, not only because the empire itself was often one of the most powerful on the continent but also because of the status of the emperor himself. Because the Holy Roman Emperors were the internationally recognized heirs of the old Roman emperors and the foremost Christian rulers, they claimed (and were often granted) precedence over other rulers.

Although the emperors had been formally titled as "Elected Roman Emperor" since 1508, when Emperor Maximilian I took the title without the need for a papal coronation, the universalist character of the empire was sustained through the emperor's feudal authority extending beyond just the institutions that had been developed within the formal imperial borders. Imperial territories held by rulers of other realms remained imperial vassals. For instance, the kings of both Sweden and Denmark accepted vassalage in regards to their German lands until 1806, when these lands were formally incorporated into their kingdoms. The Reformation of the 16th century had made managing the empire more difficult and made its role as "holy" questionable. Despite Lutheranism and Calvinism being tolerated from 1555 and 1648 onwards respectively, Catholicism remained the only recognized faith. Even then, the Imperial Church diminished from the 16th century onwards, with some church territories secularised or always governed by the same family. The "holy" nature of the empire became even more questionable when the possibility of permanent peace with the Ottoman Empire, widely seen as the mortal enemies of Christian Europe, was accepted through the 1699 Peace of Karlowitz.

Both the papacy and the Holy Roman Empire continued to claim their traditional rights of universal jurisdiction into the early modern period, that it was their right to exercise jurisdiction throughout the entire world, even if they did not have de facto control over particular territories. This universal jurisdiction was so enduring that English King Henry VIII felt it necessary to make it illegal to appeal to secular powers and courts outside of England. Conjointly with the papacy, the Holy Roman Empire represented the recognized center of the Christian world, and one of the pillars upon which it rested. It was always its influence and its place in the recognized world order that gave the Holy Roman Empire its true power, rather than the actual extent of its territorial domains. This uncontested Roman Imperial moral authority was effectively ended at the Peace of Westphalia at the conclusion of the Thirty Years' War in 1648. Where international disputes between the rulers of Europe had previously been solved and mediated by the pope and/or emperor, the 17th century saw the true emergence of the modern system of international relations and diplomacy.

One of the greatest threats to the traditional (and theoretical) universal jurisdiction accorded to the Holy Roman Emperor and the pope throughout the Christian world was the emergence of modern sovereign territorial states in the 16th and 17th centuries, which meant the rise of the idea that jurisdiction was the same thing as direct control of territory. To the rulers of territorial states, both the papacy and the Holy Roman Empire represented "universal antagonists", claiming that jurisdiction over all the world was theirs by right through their connection to Ancient Rome and their role as earthly representatives of Jesus Christ. Kings who claimed their own sovereignty free from the empire did so in the role of a rex in regno suo, a ruler who could wield the legal powers of an emperor (as absolute monarch) within the borders of his own territory due to the emperors not having protected his people from foreign enemies. Ambitious emperors, such as Charles V (r. 1519–1556) and Ferdinand II (r. 1619–1637), who sought to combine universal jurisdiction with actual universal temporal rule and universal imperial authority, represented threats to the continued existence of the countries of Europe. Charles V was the last Holy Roman Emperor to be crowned by a pope and as such the last to be formally proclaimed as the church's protector, a role disregarded by many of his successors.

=== The Holy Roman Empire in the 18th century ===
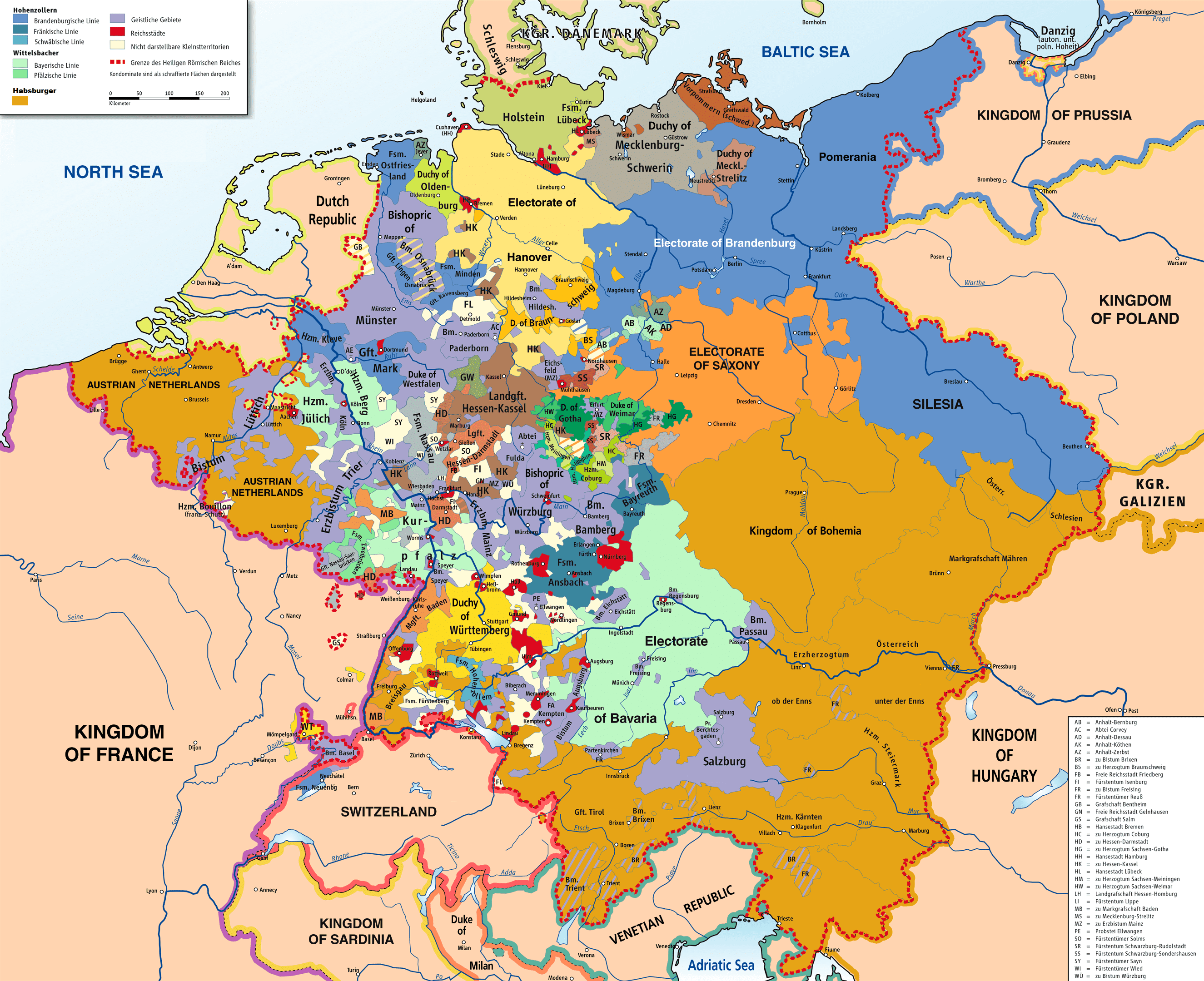
The Holy Roman Empire and its internal subdivisions and vassals in 1789

By the 18th century, the contemporary views of the Holy Roman Empire were far from universally positive. There was a widespread idea that the empire was "sick" in some capacity, for instance the bookseller and publisher Johann Heinrich Zedler mentions the "state illnesses of the Holy Roman Empire" in his 1745 Grosses Universal-Lexicon. This view dates back to at least the Peace of Westphalia, where the empire was explicitly defined as not being a nation state.

The 17th-century historian Samuel von Pufendorf famously described the empire as having an "unusual form of government" and derided it as a "monstrosity", lacking what was required for an effective and functional state. The lack of a standing army, a central treasury, weak central control exercised by a monarch who was elective and not hereditary all contributed to the idea that there was no unified German state. In the view of its contemporaries, the empire had regressed from a "regular" monarchy into a highly irregular one. The empire was mostly preserved through a self-balancing system involving not just the Imperial vassals themselves, but also states throughout Europe. Already in the 18th century, rulers throughout the continent had mused that a unitary German state could become the greatest power in Europe and it was in the interests of virtually everyone to keep central Europe "soft".

Although some German romantics and nationalists argued that the empire had to die for Germany to be reborn, a large number of Imperial subjects had not given up hope that the "sick" empire might be cured and revived. The first few years of the 19th century saw extensive reorganizations and changes in power within the empire, with the 1801 Peace of Lunéville with France meaning the end of imperial jurisdiction in the Southern Netherlands and Italy, and the rise of powerful German rulers in the north, such as the Kings of Prussia, causing the consolidation of many previously separate imperial vassals and fiefs into the hands of a few rulers. The traditional political hierarchy of the empire was disrupted, but it was not obvious to contemporaries that this was to lead to the empire's downfall. The general view was that it represented a new beginning rather than the last few steps towards an ending. Furthermore, many publicists within the empire did not see its nature as an "irregular" monarchy as something negative and were unconcerned with forming a new political or social order, but rather sought to augment the already present structures to create a better future. The Peace of Westphalia had explicitly designated that the empire was to remain non-aligned and passive and that it was to work to maintain peace in Europe, an arrangement approved of by most of its inhabitants.

Over the course of the 18th century, the rulers of the Holy Roman Empire, the Habsburg dynasty, had somewhat neglected their imperial role. Though Emperor Leopold I (r. 1658–1705) had worked on strengthening the empire and promoting its interests, among other things pursuing a much appreciated cultural policy and successfully warring against the Ottomans, his sons and successors Joseph I (r. 1705–1711) and Charles VI (r. 1711–1740) spent more effort on the interests of their own dynasty than on the interests of the empire at large. In 1705, diplomatic duties and responsibilities were transferred to the Court Chancellery at Vienna from the Imperial Chancellery. Upon Charles VI's death, his daughter Maria Theresa inherited most of his titles but not the Imperial crown, as a woman was not eligible for Imperial election and so went to her rival Charles VII. When the Imperial title was instead bestowed on her husband, Emperor Francis I (r. 1745–1765), she burst out in laughter when she saw him in his imperial coronation robes, regarding his coronation as "Kasperltheater" (Punch and Judy show). Maria Theresa's and Francis I's son and successor, Joseph II (r. 1765–1790), was even more radical in his disregard for the empire. In 1778, Joseph II pondered abdicating the imperial title and in 1784 when he hoped to exchange his lands in Belgium, the Austrian Netherlands, for the Electorate of Bavaria, he considered giving up the imperial title and granting it to the Elector of Bavaria, Charles Theodore, as part of the deal. The empire was not necessarily doomed because of Habsburg disinterest; in times where the emperors disregarded the greater empire, the more powerful imperial vassals usually took steps to strengthen German unity among the imperial princes.

Despite the widespread idea that the Holy Roman Empire was "sick", the empire was not in terminal decline before its involvement in the French Revolutionary Wars from the 1790s onwards. In the 18th century, imperial institutions were experiencing something akin to a renaissance. The empire represented the safest and best guarantee for the rights of smaller states and territories in a time when Europe was beginning to be dominated by powerful imperial nation states. Because of the weak central government, the constituent territories of the empire could influence their own fates, the central Reichstag decided policy and legislation and allowed the empire to coordinate its response to the threat represented by France and the two separate imperial supreme courts and the Imperial circles represented successful venues for resolving intra-imperial conflicts. The Reichstag also worked as a place where weaker Imperial princes could work to convince their more powerful counterparts to remain at peace and resolve their differences.

== Wars with France and Napoleon ==
=== Austrian war effort and responses ===
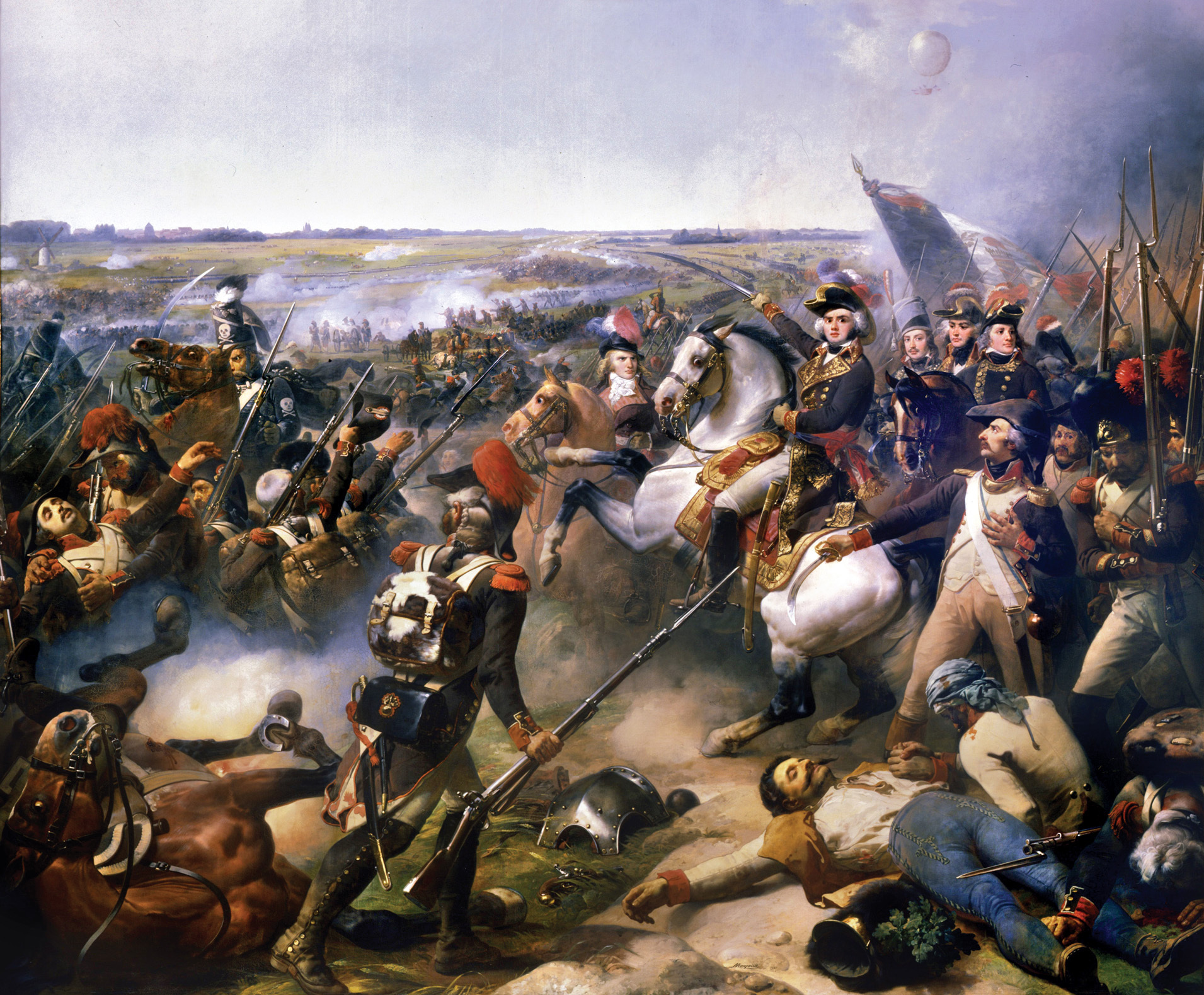
The Battle of Fleurus, which led to the French conquest of the Austrian Netherlands

Although the French First Republic overran and occupied the Austrian Netherlands in 1794, the Holy Roman Empire defended itself quite well until Prussia abandoned the war effort to focus its attention on its Polish territories (overseeing the Second and Third Partitions of Poland), taking its resources and powerful army with it. Despite the empire's mounting difficulties in the face of the wars with France, there was no large-scale popular unrest within its borders. Instead, the explanation for the end of the Holy Roman Empire lies in the realm of high politics. The empire's defeat in the Revolutionary Wars was the most decisive step in the gradual undermining of the empire. The conflict between France and the Holy Roman Empire had begun with the French declaring war on the newly crowned Emperor Francis II of the Habsburg dynasty only in his capacity as the King of Hungary. The fact that much of the wider empire (including influential figures such as the King of Prussia and the Archbishop-Elector of Mainz), however unwilling, joined the conflict on the side of the Habsburgs in a formal Reichskrieg proves that imperial ideals were still alive in the late 18th century.

The key point in which fortunes shifted was Prussia's abandonment of the war effort. Prussia had been the only true counterweight to Austria's influence in the institutions of the empire. Though the western parts of Prussia, such as Brandenburg, remained formal parts of the Holy Roman Empire and the Prussians continued to be represented in the Reichstag, Prussia ceased to compete for influence in imperial affairs. Austria stood alone as the protector of the states in southern Germany, many of which began considering making their own separate peace with France. When the Austrians learnt that Württemberg and Baden had opened formal negotiations with France, the armies sent by these two states were disbanded and disarmed in 1796, causing resentment against the emperor and, combined with losses to France, suggesting that the Habsburg emperor was no longer capable of protecting his traditional vassals in Germany.

In the wake of the wars with France, there was a substantial reorganization of Imperial territory (the so-called Reichsdeputationshauptschluss, supported by Prussia), with the Habsburg monarchy meaning to compensate those princes who had lost territory in the French wars and effectivize the empire's current semi-feudal structure. Although there were huge territorial changes, notably the almost complete abolition of any church territory and significant territorial gains for Bavaria, Baden, Württemberg, Hesse-Darmstadt and Nassau, the most important changes were in the empire's electoral college. Salzburg was added as a fourth Catholic elector, while Württemberg, Baden and Hesse-Kassel became the fourth, fifth and sixth Protestant electors, giving the Protestants a majority for the first time in history and raising doubts whether Emperor Francis II would be able to work together with his Reichstag. Although the Austrian regime spent much time and resources attempting to make the new arrangement work, the general verdict at the time was that the reorganization had essentially killed the empire.

=== Reaction to Napoleon's imperial coronation ===
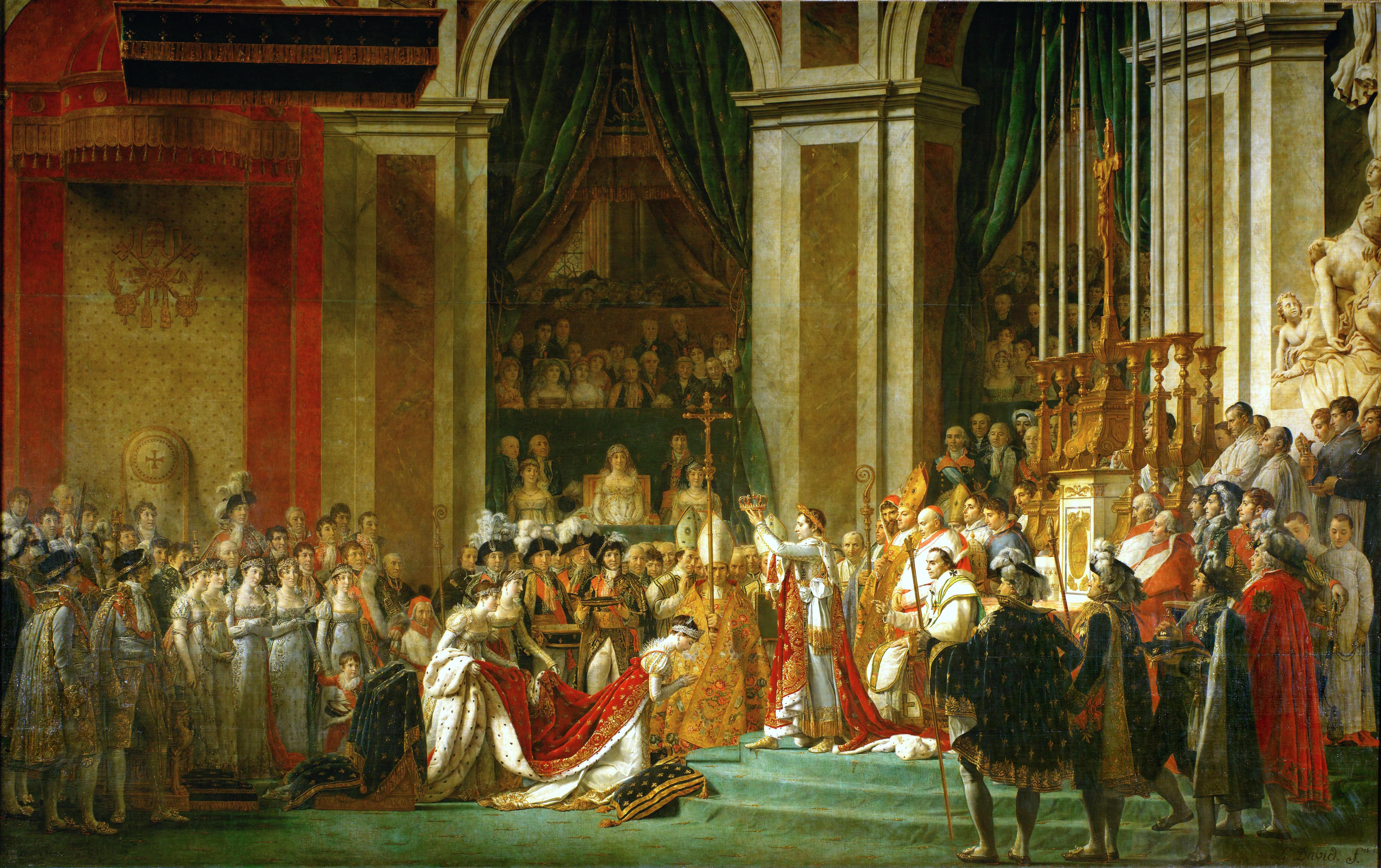
The Coronation of Napoleon (1804) (painted by Jacques-Louis David in 1807)

The First Consul of the French republic, Napoleon, assumed the title "Emperor of the French" in 1804. Among others, one of the important figures attending the coronation was Pope Pius VII, probably fearing that Napoleon planned to conquer the Papal States. Pius VII was aware that Napoleon symbolically linked his imperial coronation with the imperial coronation of Charlemagne and would most likely have caught the similarity between Napoleon's title and Emperor of the Romans, the title used by Francis II and all Holy Roman emperors before him. Through his presence at the ceremony, Pius VII symbolically approved of the transfer of imperial power (translatio imperii) from the Romans (and thus the Franks and Germans) to the French.

Napoleon's coronation received a mixed reaction in the Holy Roman Empire. Although a return to monarchy in France was welcomed (though unfortunate insofar that the monarch was Napoleon), the imperial title (instead of a royal one) was not. In the empire, Napoleon's title raised fears that it might inspire the Russian Emperor to insist that he was equal to the Holy Roman Emperor and might encourage other monarchs, such as George III of the United Kingdom, to also proclaim themselves emperors. Relations between the Habsburgs and George III were complicated; in diplomacy, the court at Vienna had for many years refused to refer to the British king as "His Majesty" since he was only a king, not an emperor. The Habsburg diplomat Ludwig von Cobenzl, fearing the consequences of Napoleon's coronation, is quoted as having advised Holy Roman Emperor Francis II that "‘as Roman Emperor, Your Majesty has enjoyed till now precedence ahead of all European potentates, including the Russian emperor".

Though Napoleon's imperial title was viewed with distaste, Austrian officials immediately realized that if they were to refuse to accept him as an emperor, war with France would be renewed. Instead, the focus became on how to accept Napoleon as an emperor while still maintaining the pre-eminence of their own emperor and empire. France had officially accepted parity with Austria as a distinct state in 1757, 1797 and 1801 and in the same settlements accepted that the Holy Roman Empire outranked both Austria and France. Thus, it was decided that Austria would be raised to the rank of an empire in order to maintain the parity between Austria and France while still preserving the Roman imperial title as pre-eminent, outranking both.

=== Empire of Austria ===
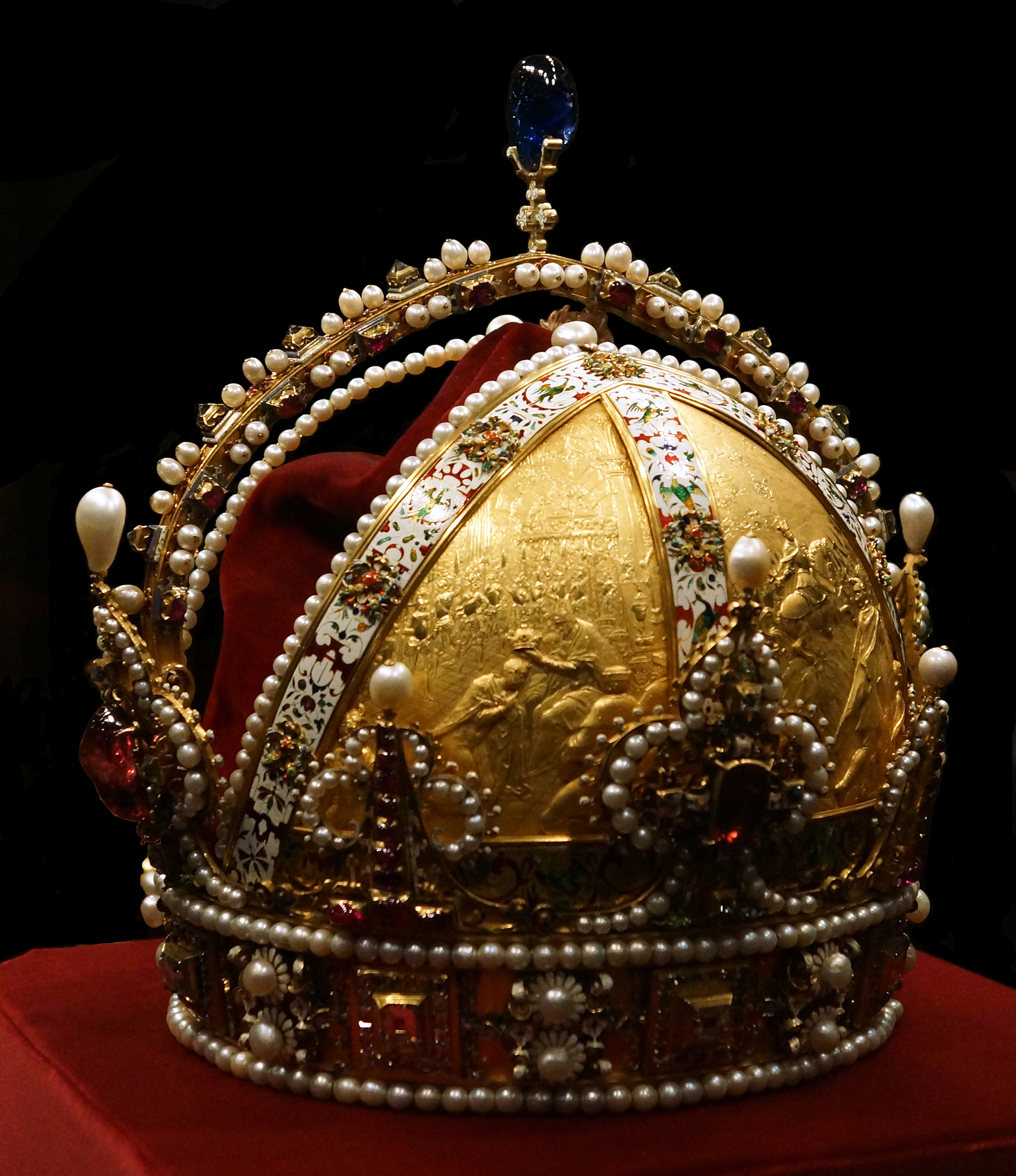
The Imperial Crown of Austria, used until the end of the Habsburg monarchy in Austria and originally made for Rudolf II, Holy Roman Emperor

Francis II proclaimed himself as Emperor of Austria (without the need of a new coronation, as he had already had an imperial coronation) on 11 August 1804, in addition to already being the Holy Roman Emperor. Cobenzl advised that a separate hereditary Austrian title would also allow the Habsburg to maintain parity with other rulers (since the Holy Roman title was viewed by Cobenzl as merely honorific) and ensure elections to the position of Holy Roman Emperor in the future. A myriad of reasons were used to justify the Austrian Empire's creation, including the number of subjects under the Habsburg Monarchy, the vast extent of his crown lands and the long association between the Habsburg family and the elective Holy Roman imperial title. Another important point used to justify its creation was that Francis was, in the traditional sense, the supreme Christian monarch and he was thus entitled to award himself with any dignities he wished. The title "Emperor of Austria" was meant to associate with all of Francis II's personal domains (not just Austria, but also lands such as Bohemia and Hungary), regardless of their current position within or outside the Holy Roman Empire. "Austria" in this sense referred to the dynasty (often officially called the "House of Austria" instead of the "House of Habsburg"), not the old Archduchy of Austria.

The title of Holy Roman Emperor remained pre-eminent to both "Emperor of the French" and "Emperor of Austria" as it embodied the traditional ideal of the universal Christian empire. Neither the Austrian nor the French title made claims to govern this universal empire and thus did not disturb the traditional and established world order. The imperial titles of Austria and France were seen as more or less royal titles (as they were hereditary) and in the minds of the Austrians, there still remained only one true empire and one true emperor in Europe. To illustrate this, Francis II's official imperial title read "elected Roman Emperor, ever Augustus, hereditary Emperor of Austria", placing the Austrian title behind the Roman title.

Though Napoleon was reluctant to tie his own imperial title to any concessions, he needed recognition from Austria to secure wider recognition and thus agreed to recognize Francis II's new title. Prior to his own coronation, he sent a personal letter of congratulations to Francis. George III of the United Kingdom recognized the new title in October and although Emperor Alexander I of Russia objected to Francis "lowering himself to the level of the usurper Napoleon", he recognized the title in November. The only significant objections to Francis II's title were raised by Sweden, which through holding Swedish Pomerania, an Imperial estate, had a place in the Reichstag. The Swedes saw the title as a "clear breach" of the Imperial constitution and, invoking their prerogative as a guarantor of the imperial constitution, demanded a formal debate in the Reichstag, a threat that was neutralized by the other parties of the Reichstag agreeing to an extended summer recess until November. To defend the title, Imperial representatives argued that it did not infringe on the Imperial constitution as there were already other examples of dual monarchies within the empire: states such as Prussia and Sweden were not part of the empire, but their possessions within the empire were.

=== Peace of Pressburg ===
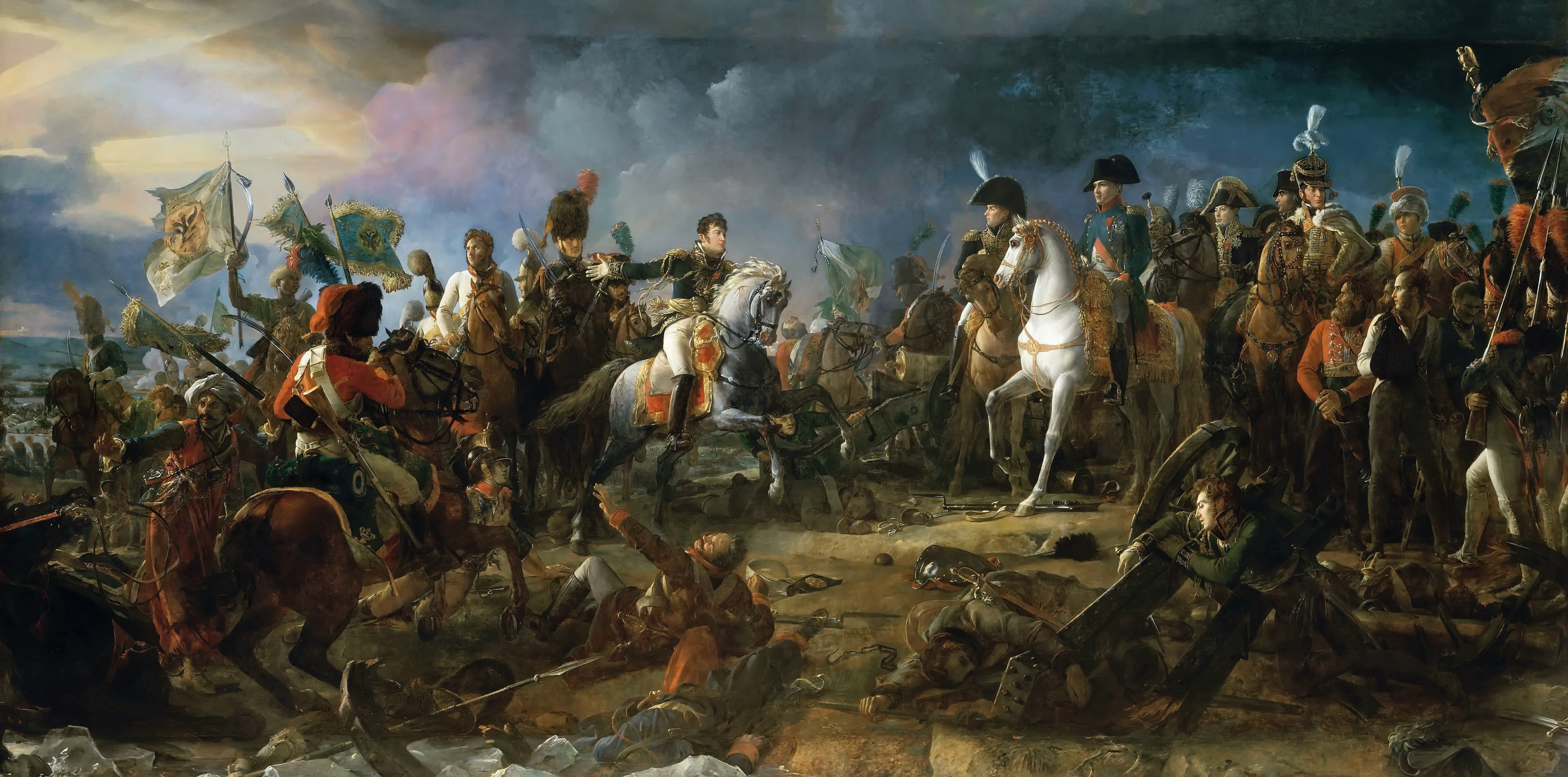
Napoléon at the Battle of Austerlitz by François Gérard (1810)

The War of the Third Coalition came too soon for Austria, which moved against France in September 1805. Defeated at the Battle of Austerlitz on 2 December 1805, Austria had to accept terms dictated by Napoleon in the Peace of Pressburg (26 December). These created deliberate ambiguities in the imperial constitution. Bavaria, Baden and Württemberg were granted plénitude de la souveraineté (full sovereignty) while remaining a part of the Conféderation Germanique (Germanic Confederation), a novel name for the Holy Roman Empire. Likewise, it was left deliberately unclear whether the Duchy of Cleves, the Duchy of Berg and the County of Mark—imperial territories transferred to Joachim Murat—were to remain imperial fiefs or become part of the French Empire. As late as March 1806, Napoleon was uncertain whether they should remain nominally within the Empire.

The Free Imperial Knights, who had survived the attack on their rights in the Rittersturm of 1803–04, were subject to a second attack and a spate of annexations by those states allied to Napoleon in November–December 1805. In response, the knights' corporation (corpus equestre) dissolved itself on 20 January 1806. With the dissolution of the Empire, the knights lost their Imperial immediacy, ceasing to be either free or Imperial and were at the mercy of the newly sovereign states.

Contemporaries saw the defeat at Austerlitz as a turning point of world-historical significance. The Peace of Pressburg, too, was perceived as radical shift. It did not affirm previous treaties in the usual way and its wording seemed to raise Bavaria, Baden and Württemberg into equals of the empire while downgrading the latter to a merely German confederation. Nevertheless, Bavaria and Württemberg reaffirmed to the Reichstag that they were subject to Imperial law. Some commentators argued that plénitude de la souveraineté was just a French translation of Landeshoheit (the quasi-sovereignty possessed by Imperial estates) and the treaty had not altered the relationship between the members and the empire.

== Formation of the Confederation of the Rhine ==
Throughout the first half of 1806, Bavaria, Baden and Württemberg attempted to steer an independent course between the demands of the empire and Napoleon. In April 1806, Napoleon sought a treaty whereby the three states would ally themselves to France in perpetuity while forswearing participation in future Reichskriege (imperial war efforts) and submitting to a commission de méditation under his presidency to resolve their disputes. Despite all of this, they were to remain members of the empire. Württemberg ultimately refused to sign.

In June 1806, Napoleon began pressuring Bavaria, Baden and Württemberg for the creation of confédération de la haute Allemagne (Upper German confederation) outside the empire. On 12 July 1806, these three states and thirteen other minor German princes formed the Confederation of the Rhine, effectively a French satellite state. The group included Karl Theodor Dalberg of the Electorate of Regensburg who resigned from his position as archchancellor of Germany on 31 July. On 1 August, the Reichstag was informed by a French envoy that Napoleon no longer recognized the existence of the Holy Roman Empire and on the same day, nine of the princes who had formed the Confederation of the Rhine issued a proclamation in which they justified their actions by claiming that the Holy Roman Empire had already collapsed and ceased to function due to the defeat in the Battle of Austerlitz.

== Abdication of Francis II ==
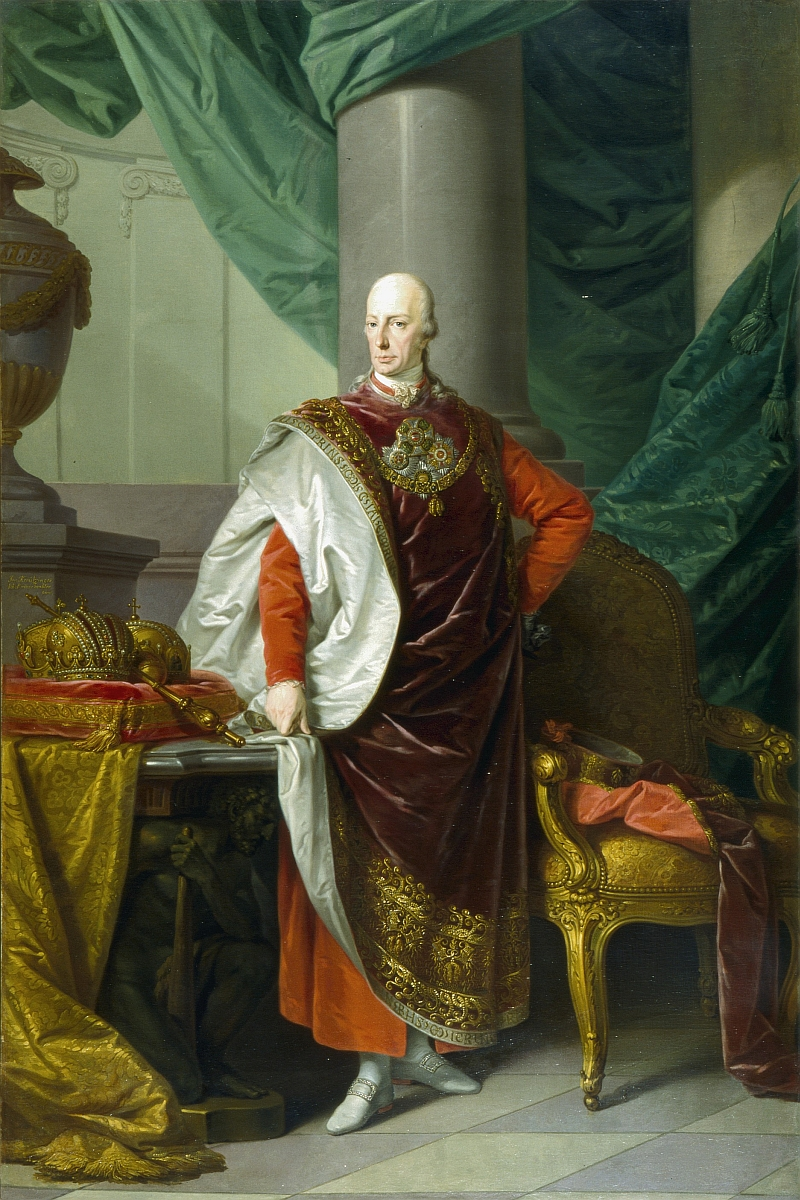
Francis I as Austrian Emperor, undated, Salzburg Museum

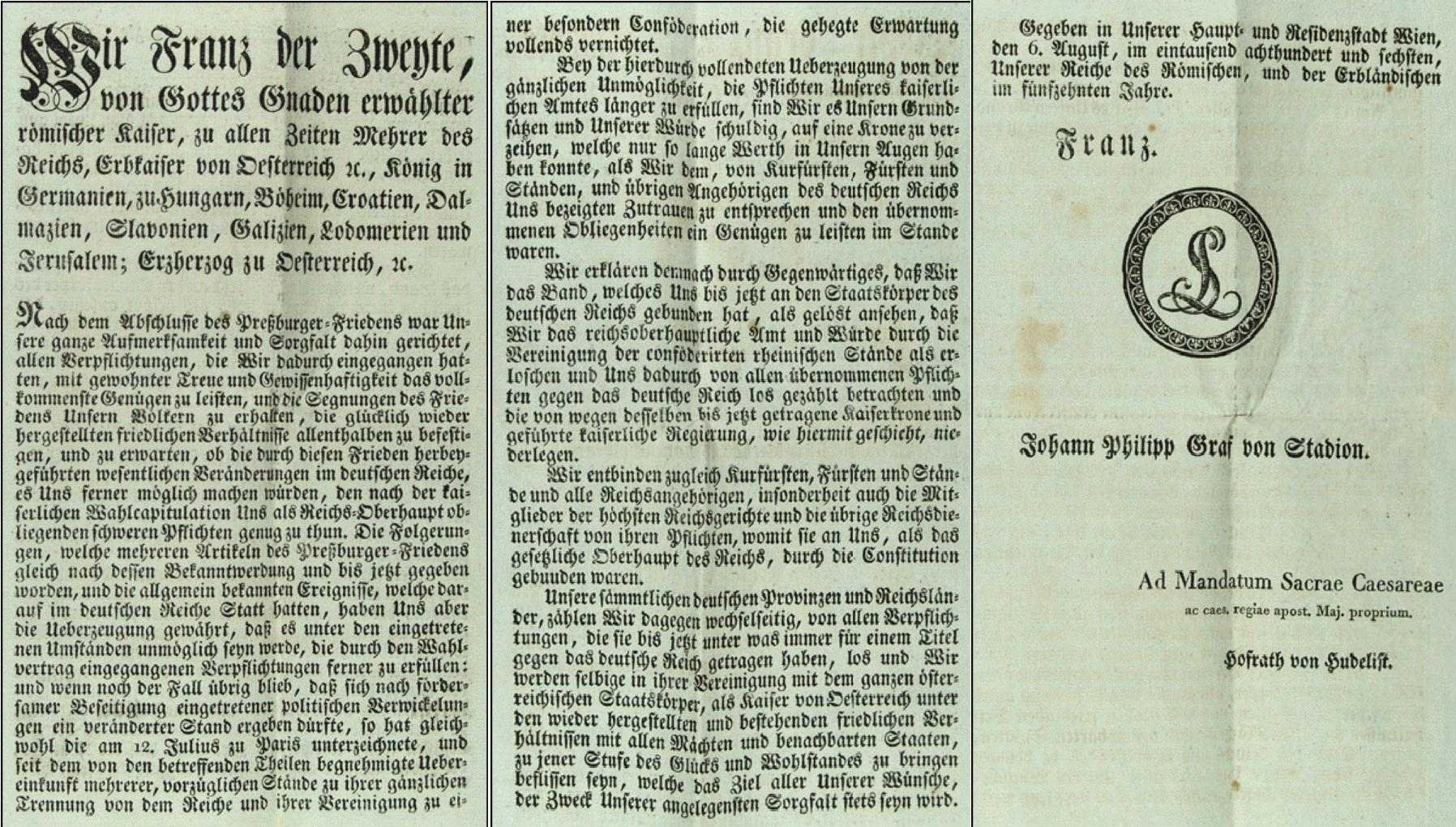
Printed version of the abdication of Emperor Francis II

In the face of Napoleon's assumption of the title "Emperor of the French" in 1804 and the Austrian defeat at the Battle of Austerlitz in 1805, the Habsburg monarchy began contemplating whether the imperial title and the empire as a whole were worth defending. Many of the states nominally serving the Holy Roman Emperor, such as Baden, Württemberg and Bavaria, had openly defied Imperial authority and sided with Napoleon. Even then, the significance of the empire was not based on actual control of resources, but on prestige.

The main idea behind Francis II's actions in 1806 was to lay the groundwork needed to avoid additional future wars with Napoleon and France. One concern held by the Habsburg monarchy was that Napoleon might aspire to claim the title of Holy Roman Emperor. Napoleon was attracted to Charlemagne's legacy; replicas of Charlemagne's crown and sword had been made for (but not used during) Napoleon's coronation as Emperor of the French and he consciously revived Roman imperial symbols and aspired to create a new order in Europe, something akin to the universal dominion implicit in the title of Emperor of the Romans. Napoleon's vision of Charlemagne was completely different from the German vision of the old emperor, however. Instead of seeing Charlemagne as a German king, Napoleon viewed him as a Frankish conqueror who had extended French rule across Central Europe and Italy, something Napoleon aspired to accomplish as well.

Austria was slow to respond to the fast pace of events. Already on 17 June, Francis had taken the decision to abdicate at the moment that seemed best for Austria. Klemens von Metternich was sent on a mission to Paris to discern Napoleon's intentions. On 22 July, Napoleon made them clear in an ultimatum demanding that Francis abdicate by 10 August. Still, as late as 2 August, Joseph Haas, the head of the principal commission's secretariat, hoped that the end of the Holy Roman Empire might yet be averted. The general opinion among the Austrian government was however that abdication was inevitable and that it should be combined with a dissolution of the Holy Roman Empire through relieving the vassals of the emperor of their duties and obligations. A formal dissolution of the empire was perceived as necessary, as it would prevent Napoleon from acquiring the imperial title. During an interregnum, the two imperial vicars Saxony and Bavaria would be entitled to exercise imperial authority and, since both were aligned with Napoleon, such an arrangement could cause an abdicated Francis (as only Emperor of Austria) to become a vassal of Napoleon (as Holy Roman Emperor). Though there is no concrete evidence that Napoleon actually aspired to become Holy Roman Emperor, it is possible that he entertained the idea, especially after he had formed the Confederation of the Rhine and beaten back Austria in early 1806. Perhaps Napoleon did not think that the title could be combined with "Emperor of the French" (even though Francis II was emperor of both the Holy Roman Empire and Austria) and because of this he might have abandoned any potential Roman aspirations since he did not wish to relinquish his other imperial title. The ephemeral Roman aspirations can also be gathered from Napoleon's correspondence with the papacy; in early 1806, he warned Pope Pius VII that "Your Holiness is sovereign in Rome but I am its Emperor".

More crucially than fearing Napoleon potentially usurping the title, the abdication was also intended to buy time for Austria to recover from its losses as it was assumed that France would meet it with some concessions. Although the Roman title and the tradition of a universal Christian monarchy were still considered prestigious and a worthy heritage, they were now also considered things of the past. With the Holy Roman Empire dissolved, Francis II could focus his attention on the continued rise and prosperity of his new hereditary empire, as Emperor Francis I of Austria.

On the morning of 6 August 1806, the Imperial herald of the Holy Roman Empire rode from the Hofburg to the Church of the Nine Choirs of Angels (both being located in Vienna, the capital of the Habsburg monarchy), where he delivered Francis II's official proclamation from a balcony overlooking a large square. Written copies of the proclamation were dispatched to the diplomats of the Habsburg monarchy on 11 August alongside a note which informed former princes of the empire that Austria would compensate those who had been paid from the Imperial treasury. The abdication did not acknowledge the French ultimatum, but stressed that the interpretation of the Peace of Pressburg by the imperial estates made it impossible for Francis to fulfill the obligations he had undertaken in his electoral capitulation.

Holy Roman Emperors had abdicated before—the most notable example being the abdication of Charles V in 1556—but Francis II's abdication was unique. While previous abdications had returned the Imperial crown to the electors so that they might proclaim a new emperor, Francis II's abdication simultaneously dissolved the empire itself so that there were no more electors.

== Reactions and legacy ==
=== Reactions ===
==== Popular reactions ====
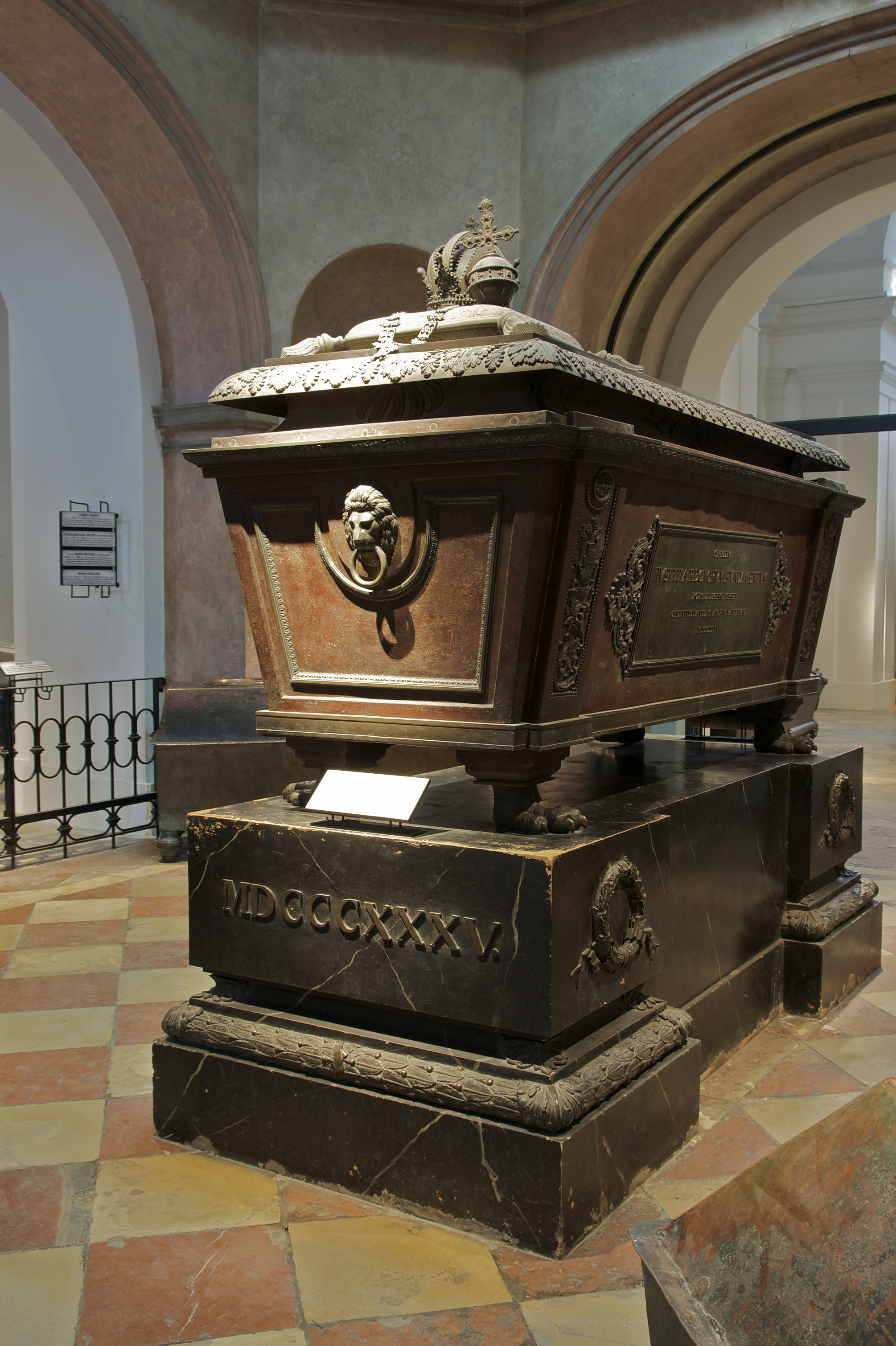
Sarcophagus of Emperor Francis II in the Imperial Crypt in Vienna. The associated plaque describes him as the "last Roman emperor".

The Holy Roman Empire, an institution which had lasted for just over a thousand years, did not pass unnoticed or unlamented. The dissolution of the empire sent shockwaves through Germany, with most of the reactions within the former imperial boundaries being rage, grief or shame. Even the signatories of the Confederation of the Rhine were outraged; the Bavarian emissary to the Imperial diet, Rechberg, stated that he was "furious" due to having "put his signature to the destruction of the German name", referring to his state's involvement in the confederation, which had effectively doomed the empire. From a legal standpoint, Francis II's abdication was controversial. Contemporary legal commentators agreed that the abdication itself was perfectly legal but that the emperor did not have the authority to dissolve the empire. As such, several of the empire's vassals refused to recognize that the empire had ended. As late as October 1806, farmers in Thuringia refused to accept the end of the empire, believing its dissolution to be a plot by the local authorities. For many of the people within the former empire, its collapse made them uncertain and fearful of their future, and the future of Germany itself. Contemporary reports from Vienna describe the dissolution of the empire as "incomprehensible" and the general public's reaction as one of horror.

In contrast to the fears of the general public, many contemporary intellectuals and artists saw Napoleon as a herald of a new age, rather than a destroyer of an old order. The popular idea forwarded by German nationalists was that the final collapse of the Holy Roman Empire freed Germany from the somewhat anachronistic ideas rooted in a fading ideal of universal Christianity and paved the way for the country's unification as the German Empire, a nation state, 65 years later. German historian Helmut Rössler has argued that Francis II and the Austrians fought to save the largely ungrateful Germany from the forces of Napoleon, only withdrawing and abandoning the empire when most of Germany betrayed them and joined Napoleon. Indeed, the assumption of a separate Austrian imperial title in 1804 did not mean that Francis II had any intentions to abdicate his prestigious position as the Roman emperor, the idea only began to be considered as circumstances beyond Habsburg control forced decisive actions to be taken.

Compounded with fears of what now guaranteed the safety of many of the smaller German states, the poet Christoph Martin Wieland lamented that Germany had now fallen into an "apocalyptic time" and stating "Who can bear this disgrace, which weighs down upon a nation which was once so glorious?—may God improve things, if it is still possible to improve them!". To some, the dissolution of the Holy Roman Empire was seen as the final end of the ancient Roman Empire. In the words of Christian Gottlob von Voigt, a minister in Weimar, "if poetry can go hand in hand with politics, then the abdication of the imperial dignity offers a wealth of material. The Roman Empire now takes its place in the sequence of vanquished empires". In the words of the English historian James Bryce, 1st Viscount Bryce in his 1864 work on the Holy Roman Empire, the empire was the "oldest political institution in the world" and the same institution as the one founded by Augustus in 27 BC. Writing of the empire, Bryce stated that "nothing else so directly linked the old world to the new—nothing else displayed so many strange contrasts of the present and the past, and summed up in those contrasts so much of European history". When confronted by the fall and collapse of their empire, many contemporaries employed the catastrophic fall of ancient Troy as a metaphor, due to its association with the notion of total destruction and the end of a culture. The image of the apocalypse was also frequently used, associating the collapse of the Holy Roman Empire with an impending end of the world (echoing medieval legends of a Last Roman Emperor, a figure prophesied to be active during the end times).

Criticism and protests against the empire's dissolution were typically censored, especially in the French-administered Confederation of the Rhine. Among the aspects most criticized by the general populace was the removal or replacement of the traditional intercessions for the empire and emperor in the daily church prayers throughout former imperial territory. Suppression from France, combined with examples of excessive retribution against pro-empire advocates, ensured that these protests soon died down.

==== Official and international reactions ====
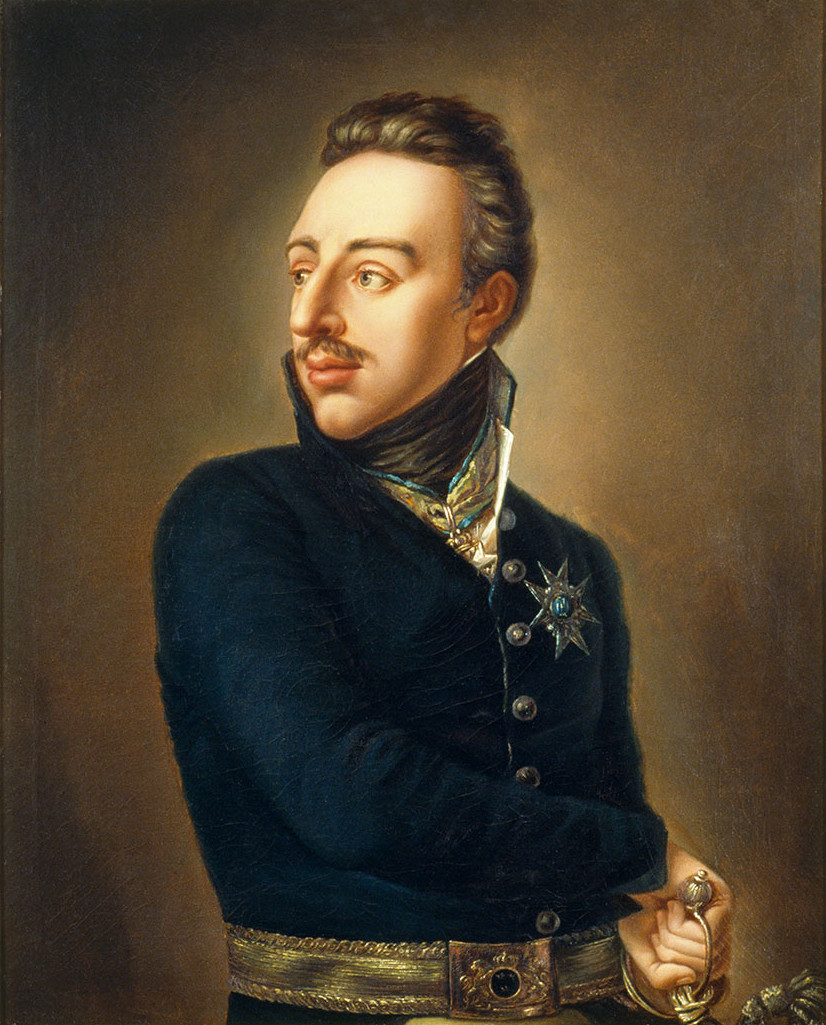
King Gustav IV Adolf of Sweden, who in 1806 issued a proclamation to his German subjects that the dissolution of the empire "would not destroy the German nation"

In an official capacity, Prussia's response was only formulaic expressions of regret owing to the "termination of an honourable bond hallowed by time". Prussia's representative to the Reichstag, Baron Görtz, reacted with sadness, mixed with gratitude and affection for the House of Habsburg and their former role as emperors. Görtz had taken part as an electoral emissary of the Electorate of Brandenburg (Prussia's territory within the formal imperial borders) in 1792, at the election of Francis II as Holy Roman Emperor, and exclaimed that "So the emperor whom I helped elect was the last emperor!—This step was no doubt to be expected, but that does not make its reality any less moving and crushing. It cuts off the last thread of hope to which one tried to cling". Baron von Wiessenberg, the Austrian envoy to the Electorate of Hesse, reported that the local elector, William I, had teared up and expressed lament at the loss of "a constitution to which Germany had for so long owed its happiness and freedom".

Internationally, the empire's demise was met with mixed or indifferent reactions. Alexander I of Russia offered no response and Christian VII of Denmark formally incorporated his German lands into his kingdoms a few months after the empire's dissolution. Gustav IV Adolf of Sweden (who notably hadn't recognized the separate imperial title of Austria yet) issued a somewhat provocative proclamation to the denizens of his German lands (Swedish Pomerania and Rügen) on 22 August 1806, stating that the dissolution of the Holy Roman Empire "would not destroy the German nation" and expressed hopes that the empire might be revived.

=== Possibility of restoration ===
The dissolution of the Holy Roman Empire was constituted by Francis II's own personal abdication of the title and the release of all vassals and imperial states from their obligations and duties to the emperor. The title of Holy Roman Emperor (theoretically the same title as Roman emperor) and the Holy Roman Empire itself as an idea and institution (the theoretically universally sovereign imperium) were never formally abolished. The continued existence of a universal empire, though without defined territory and lacking an emperor, was sometimes referenced in the titles of other later monarchs. For instance, the Savoyard Kings of Italy continued to claim the title "Prince and Perpetual Vicar of the Holy Roman Empire (in Italy)" (a title originating from a 14th-century imperial grant from Emperor Charles IV to their ancestor Amadeus VI, Count of Savoy) until the abolition of the Italian monarchy in 1946.

In the aftermath of Napoleon's defeats in 1814 and 1815, there was a widespread sentiment in Germany and elsewhere which called for the revival of the Holy Roman Empire under the leadership of Francis I of Austria. At the time, there were several factors which prevented the restoration of the empire as it had been in the 18th century, notably the rise of larger, more consolidated kingdoms in Germany, such as Bavaria, Saxony and Württemberg, as well as Prussia's interest in becoming a great power in Europe (rather than continue being a vassal to the Habsburgs). Even then, the restoration of the Holy Roman Empire, with a modernized internal political structure, had not been out of reach at the 1814–1815 Congress of Vienna (which decided Europe's borders in the aftermath of Napoleon's defeat). However, Emperor Francis had come to the conclusion before the congress that the Holy Roman Empire's political structure would not have been superior to the new order in Europe and that restoring it was not in the interest of the Habsburg monarchy. In an official capacity, the papacy considered the fact that the Holy Roman Empire was not restored at the Congress of Vienna (alongside other decisions made during the negotiations) to be "detrimental to the interests of the Catholic religion and the rights of the church".

In the Holy Roman Empire's place, the Congress of Vienna created the German Confederation, which was led by the Austrian emperors as "Bundespräsidium" and would prove to be ineffective. The Confederation was weakened by the German revolutions of 1848–1849, whereafter the Frankfurt Parliament, elected by the people of the Confederation, attempted to proclaim a German Empire and designate Frederick William IV of Prussia as their emperor. Frederick William IV himself did not approve of the idea, instead favoring a restoration of the Holy Roman Empire under the Habsburgs of Austria, though neither the Habsburgs themselves nor the German revolutionaries, still active at the time, would have approved of that idea.

=== Successor empires and legacy ===
The German Empire (blue) and Austria-Hungary (red), as they both existed between 1871 and 1918

In the Austrian Empire, the Habsburg dynasty continued to act as a substitute for nationality, though the Austrian imperial title was not (unlike for instance the French or Russian imperial titles) associated with any nationality in particular. Though the German vassals of the Holy Roman Empire had been released from their obligations, Francis II and his successors continued to rule a large German-speaking population and the Holy Roman Imperial Regalia continued to be kept within their domains (and are to this day stored and displayed at the Imperial Treasury at the Hofburg in Vienna). The dynasty retained its prominent status among the royal families of Europe and were in the eyes of many of their subjects still the only true imperial family. Although the new Austrian Empire lacked many of the key elements of the Holy Roman Empire, it remained close in practice and ideals to the pre-1806 empire. In many respects, the Austrian emperors continued to act as protectors of the Catholic Church, just as the Holy Roman emperors had before them, continuing to claim the right of the Jus exclusivae. During his 1809–1814 imprisonment in France and after his subsequent release, Pope Pius VII looked to Emperor Francis as the protector of the church, for instance petitioning the emperor to help him in re-establishing the Papal States.

In the aftermath of Francis II's abdication, the new Austrian Empire took steps to distance itself from the older empire. The symbols and formal titles of the Austrian monarchy were altered to stress Austria as a distinct entity. Because the term Kaiserthum Österreich (Empire of Austria) had entered everyday speech, the monarchy soon dropped the original prefix "hereditary", which had been used from 1804 to 1806 to stress the difference between Austria and the Holy Roman Empire.

In addition to the Austrian Empire (and France under Napoleon), the most prominent potential claimant to the Holy Roman Empire's legacy (in the sense of ruling Germany) in the wake of its collapse and dissolution was the Kingdom of Prussia, ruled by the House of Hohenzollern. Alongside the growing crown lands of the Habsburgs, Prussia represented the sole major power in Central Europe during the last century or so of Holy Roman imperial rule. It was frequently rumored that the Prussians had imperial ambitions, and Frederick II of Prussia was a rumored candidate to the position of Holy Roman Emperor in 1740. Frederick II, and other Prussian kings, dismissed these ideas while they remained under Imperial rule, arguing that additional territory and power would be more beneficial than the Imperial title. In 1795 and again in 1803 and 1804, French representatives suggested that Prussia might convert its northern German territories into an empire, but the Hohenzollerns were not interested in going through with such a plan. Though the Prussian rulers and their officials expressed sorrow at the collapsing state of the Holy Roman Empire from 1792 onwards, they were also critical of nostalgia for Germany's history under imperial rule. The Prussians viewed the survival chances of the Holy Roman Empire as very low and saw the French as the true successors of the ancient Carolingians, an enemy which they believed could not be defeated by normal military means.

The modern states of Germany, seen by some as successors to the German states of the Holy Roman Empire

The reluctance of the Hohenzollerns to assume an imperial title shifted in 1806 as they feared that, with the formation of the Confederation of the Rhine and the dissolution of the Holy Roman Empire, Napoleon might aspire to claim the hypothetical position of "Emperor of Germany". Though preparations were made to create an "imperial union" in northern Germany, with an emperor of the Hohenzollern dynasty, these plans were dropped in September 1806 after they found little support, and Emperor Alexander I of Russia objected to them. Because the Hohenzollerns lacked imperial ancestry they did not see themselves as an imperial dynasty and, even after Napoleon's ultimate defeats in 1813 and 1815, their position changed little. Although Germany was united into the German Empire in 1871 under the Hohenzollern emperor Wilhelm I, the proclamation of the new empire was ideologically problematic and the Hohenzollerns found themselves mostly ill-at-ease with its implications. Attempts were made to associate the German Empire with the institutions of the Holy Roman Empire, but its emperors continued to enumerate themselves after the Kings of Prussia; Emperor Frederick III (r. 1888) was enumerated after his predecessor as king, Frederick II, not after the previous Imperial Frederick (Emperor Frederick III of the 15th century, the new Frederick would then have been Frederick IV).

Both the German Empire and Austria-Hungary, the Habsburg-ruled Dual Monarchy, fell in 1918 in the aftermath of the First World War. Over the course of the centuries, the many states of the Holy Roman Empire would evolve into the 16 modern states of Germany. As partly sovereign polities, the German states, especially in more or less independently administered areas such as culture and education, harken back to the old empire. Historians Norman Stone and Johannes Burkhardt have compared the Holy Roman Empire, especially in regards to its locally administered component states, to the modern Federal Republic of Germany, with Burkhardt writing that "I can state unequivocally that the Old Reich was the true predecessor of the Federal Republic of Germany" and Stone writing, in regards to the modern republic's foundation, that "This time it [has been] a Germany minus Prussia and Austria. It was a return to the old Holy Roman Empire, to a Germany where true civilisation existed on a very local level, that of the prince-bishopric".

Despite the Holy Roman Empire ultimately failing to prevent war with France, the late empire's nominal role in working for peace and forming a loose sort of hegemony and partnership offered an alternative to both the universal absolute monarchy of Napoleon's French Empire and the universal republic advocated by Revolutionary France and it served as a model for the constitutions of international bodies and organizations of the future.

== See also ==
- Succession of the Roman Empire
