= 1764 imperial election =

Election in the Holy Roman Empire

1764 Imperial election
- 27 March 1764
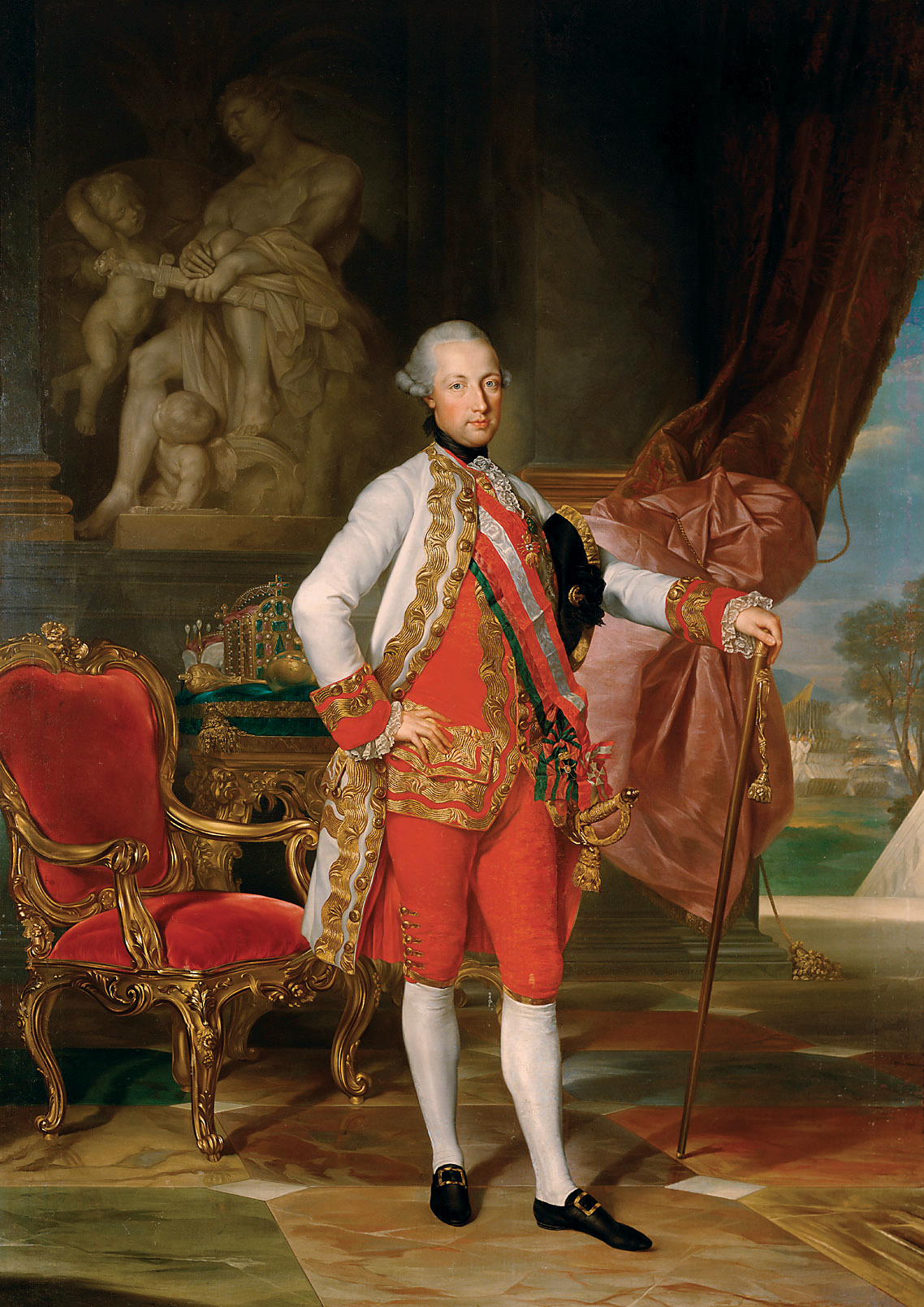
Candidate	Joseph II
House	Habsburg
Electoral vote	7
Percentage	100%
Emperor before election
Francis I
Habsburg-Lorraine
Elected Emperor
Joseph II
Habsburg

The imperial election of 1764 was an imperial election held to select the emperor of the Holy Roman Empire. It took place in Frankfurt on 27 March.

== Background ==
Francis I, Holy Roman Emperor called for the election of his successor. The prince-electors called to Frankfurt were:

- Emmerich Joseph von Breidbach zu Bürresheim, elector of Mainz
- Johann IX Philipp von Walderdorff, elector of Trier
- Maximilian Friedrich von Königsegg-Rothenfels, elector of Cologne
- Maria Theresa, queen regnant of Bohemia
- Maximilian III Joseph, elector of Bavaria
- Frederick Augustus III, elector of Saxony
- Frederick II, elector of Brandenburg
- Charles Theodore, elector of the Electoral Palatinate
- George III, elector of Hanover

== Election results ==
The 1764 imperial election, held on 27 March 1764 in Frankfurt, unanimously elected Joseph II as King of the Romans. The Golden Bull of 1356 established seven prince-electors with the right to vote: three ecclesiastical electors (the Archbishops of Mainz, Trier, and Cologne) and four secular electors (the King of Bohemia, the Count Palatine of the Rhine, the Duke of Saxony, and the Margrave of Brandenburg).

Elector	Title	Vote
Emmerich Joseph von Breidbach zu Bürresheim	Archbishop of Mainz	Joseph II
Johann IX Philipp von Walderdorff	Archbishop of Trier	Joseph II
Maximilian Friedrich von Königsegg-Rothenfels	Archbishop of Cologne	Joseph II
Maria Theresa	Queen of Bohemia	Joseph II
Charles Theodore, Elector of Bavaria	Count Palatine of the Rhine	Joseph II
Frederick Christian, Elector of Saxony	Duke of Saxony	Joseph II
Frederick II of Prussia	Margrave of Brandenburg	Joseph II
Total		7 votes, 100% (unanimous)

== Aftermath ==
Joseph came to the throne on the death of his father on 18 August 1765.
