= 1790 Holy Roman Empire imperial election =

Election of Leopold II as Holy Roman Emperor in 1790

1790 Imperial election
- September 30, 1790
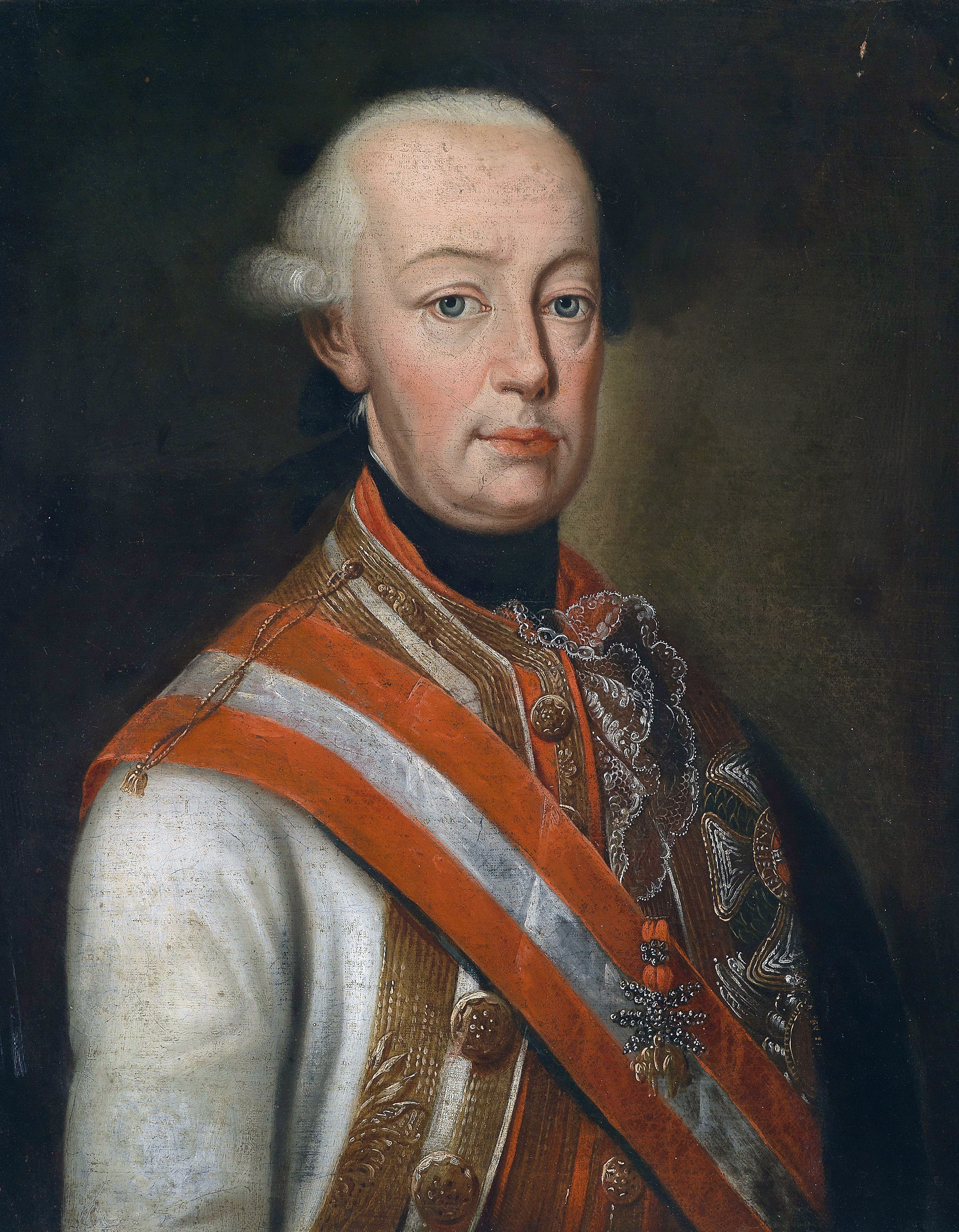
Candidate	Leopold II
House	Habsburg
Electoral vote	6
Percentage	100%
Emperor before election
Joseph II
House of Habsburg
Elected Emperor
Leopold II
House of Habsburg

The 1790 Holy Roman Empire imperial election was held on 30 September in Frankfurt. The winner was Grand Duke Leopold of the House of Habsburg, who assumed the title of Holy Roman Emperor.

Leopold succeeded his brother Joseph II, who died 20 February 1790. The election was uncontested, with Leopold securing unanimous support from the six voting prince-electors. The election occurred during the Great Turkish War and the early French Revolution.

== Background ==
The Holy Roman Empire’s elective monarchy, codified by the Golden Bull of 1356, entrusted seven prince-electors to select the King of the Romans, typically crowned Holy Roman Emperor.

An Emperor with an adult son could summon the electors to formally elect his heir presumptive as King of the Romans, allowing the son to succeed the father as Emperor without further elections upon the father's death; Emperor Francis I had done this for his son Joseph in 1764, and Joseph became Emperor upon Francis's death the next year. However, when Joseph died in 1790, he had only daughters, and the throne became vacant, prompting a new election. Joseph’s reign had involved controversial reforms and the Great Turkish War against the Ottoman Empire, alongside tensions with revolutionary France. Joseph's brother Leopold, Grand Duke of Tuscany, was the sole candidate.

== Election results ==
The election occurred in Frankfurt on 30 September 1790. Leopold, as King of Bohemia, abstained from voting to avoid a tie, per custom. The six voting electors unanimously chose Leopold, with no other candidates recorded. He was crowned King of the Romans in Frankfurt on 9 October 1790.

Elector	Title	Vote
Friedrich Karl Joseph von Erthal	Archbishop of Mainz	Leopold II
Clemens Wenceslaus of Saxony	Archbishop of Trier	Leopold II
Maximilian Francis of Austria	Archbishop of Cologne	Leopold II
Charles Theodore, Elector of Bavaria	Elector of Bavaria	Leopold II
Frederick Augustus III of Saxony	Elector of Saxony	Leopold II
Frederick William II of Prussia	Elector of Brandenburg	Leopold II
Total		6 votes, 100% (unanimous)

== See also ==
- List of imperial elections in the Holy Roman Empire
- Holy Roman Emperor
- Prince-elector
- Golden Bull of 1356
- House of Habsburg
