= Holy Roman Emperor =

Ruler of the Holy Roman Empire from 800 to 1806

Emperor of the Romans
- Imperator Romanorum; Kaiser der Römer
- Imperial
- Double-headed Reichsadler used by the Habsburg emperors of the early modern period

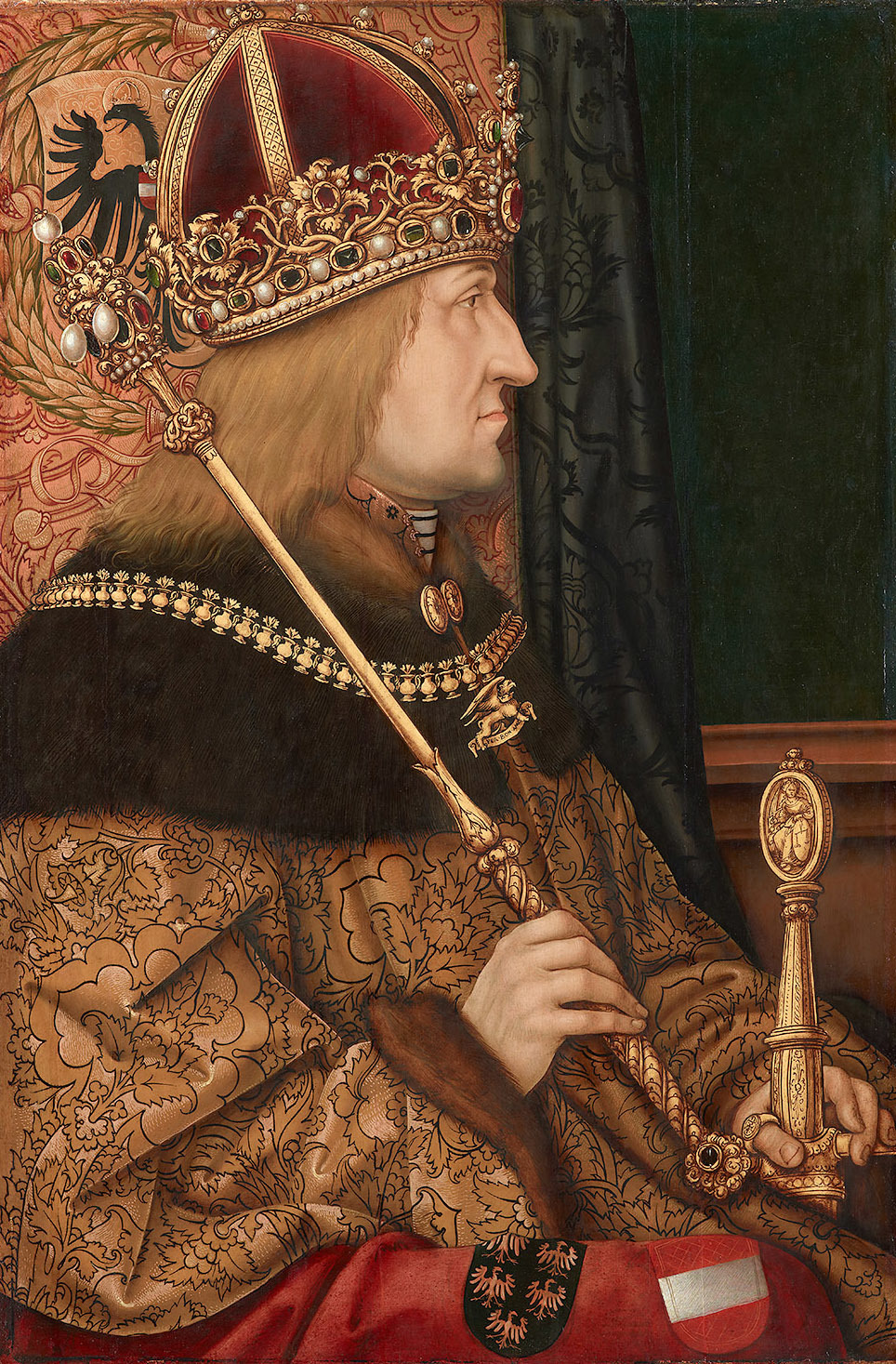
- Longest reigning Frederick III; 19 March 1452 – 19 August 1493

Details
- First monarch: Charlemagne (AD 800 formation); Otto the Great (AD 962 formation)
- Last monarch: Francis II
- Formed: 25 December 800
- Abolished: 6 August 1806

The Holy Roman Emperor, originally and officially the Emperor of the Romans (Latin: Imperator Romanorum; German: Kaiser der Römer) during the Middle Ages, and also known as the Roman-German Emperor since the early modern period (Latin: Imperator Germanorum; German: Römisch-deutscher Kaiser), was the ruler and head of state of the Holy Roman Empire. The title was held in conjunction with the title of King of Italy (Rex Italiae) from the 8th to the 16th century, and, almost without interruption, with the title of King of Germany (Rex Teutonicorum, lit. 'King of the Teutons') throughout the 12th to 18th centuries.

The Holy Roman Emperor title provided the highest prestige among medieval Catholic monarchs, because the empire was considered by the Catholic Church to be the only successor of the Roman Empire during the Middle Ages and the early modern period. Thus, in theory and diplomacy, the emperors were considered primus inter pares—first among equals—among other Catholic monarchs across Europe.

From an autocracy in Carolingian times (AD 800–924), the title by the 13th century evolved into an elective monarchy, with the emperor chosen by the prince-electors. Various royal houses of Europe, at different times, became de facto hereditary holders of the title, notably the Ottonians (962–1024), the Salians (1027–1125) and the Hohenstaufen (1138–1254). Following the late medieval crisis of government, the Habsburgs kept possession of the title (with only one interruption) from 1452 to 1806. The final emperors were from the House of Habsburg-Lorraine, from 1765 to 1806. The Holy Roman Empire was dissolved by Francis II, after a devastating defeat by Napoleon at the Battle of Austerlitz.

The emperor was widely perceived to rule by divine right, though he often contradicted or rivaled the Pope, most notably during the Investiture controversy. The Holy Roman Empire never had an empress regnant, though women such as Theophanu and Maria Theresa exerted strong influence. Throughout its history, the position was viewed as a defender of the Catholic faith. Until Maximilian I in 1508, the Emperor-elect (Imperator electus) was required to be crowned by the pope before assuming the imperial title. Charles V was the last to be crowned by the Pope in 1530. There were short periods in history when the electoral college was dominated by Protestants, and the electors usually voted in their own political interest. However, even after the Reformation, the elected emperor was always a Catholic.

== Title ==
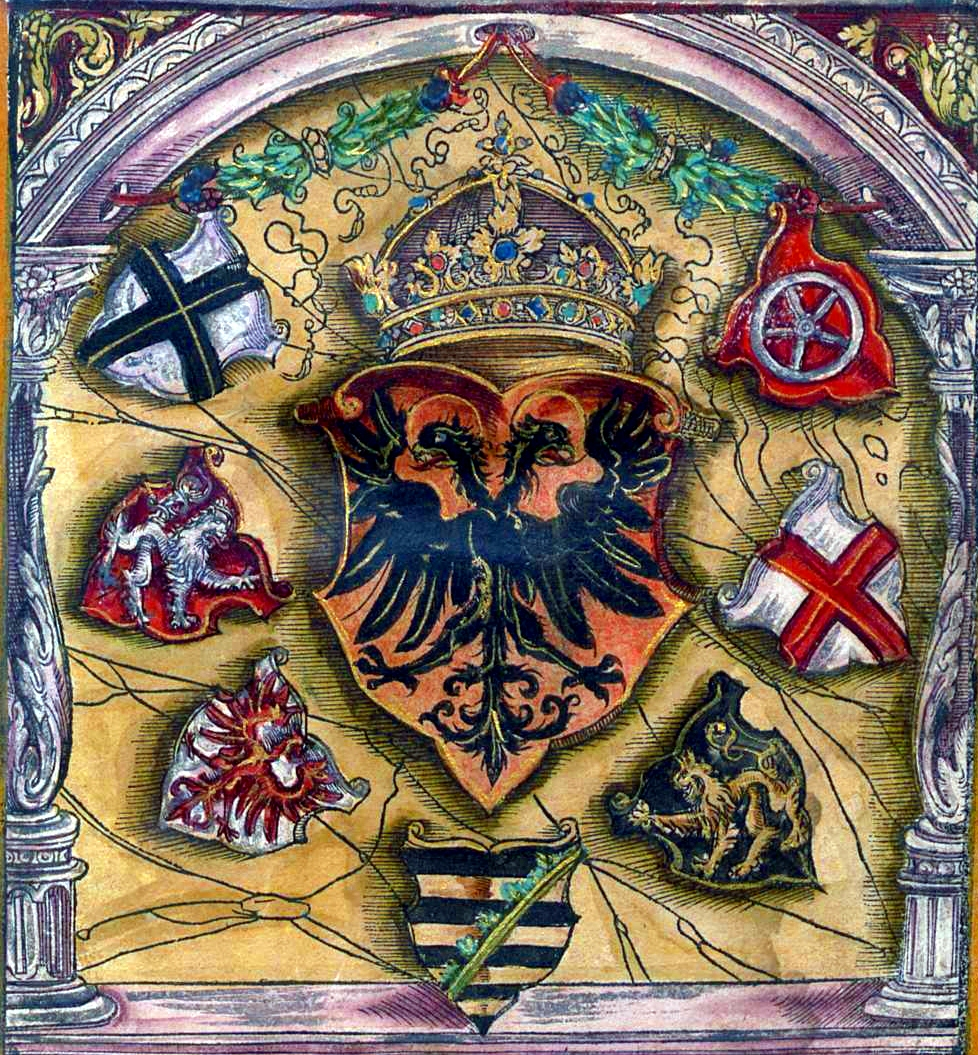
Coats of arms of prince electors surround the imperial coat of arms; from a 1545 armorial. Electors voted in an Imperial Diet for a new Holy Roman Emperor.

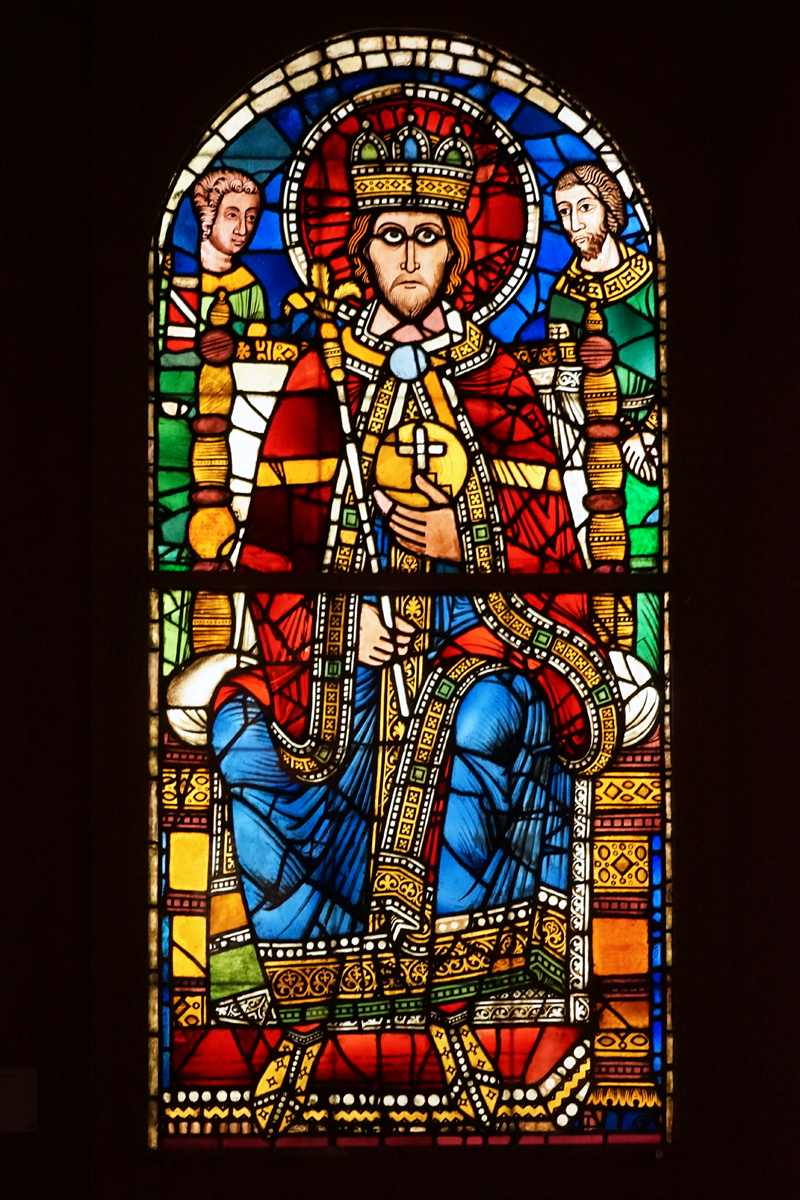
Depiction of Charlemagne in a 12th-century stained glass window, Strasbourg Cathedral, now at Musée de l'Œuvre Notre-Dame.

From the time of Constantine I (r. 306–337), the Roman Emperors had, with very few exceptions, taken on a role as promoters and defenders of Christianity. The reign of Constantine established a precedent for the position of the Christian emperor in the Great Church. Emperors considered themselves responsible to God for the spiritual health of their subjects, and after Constantine they had a duty to help the Church define and maintain orthodoxy. The emperor's role was to enforce doctrine, root out heresies, and uphold ecclesiastical unity. Both the title and connection between Emperor and Church continued in the Eastern Roman Empire throughout the medieval period (in exile during 1204–1261). The ecumenical councils of the 5th to 8th centuries were convoked by the Eastern Roman Emperors.

In Western Europe, the title of Emperor in the West lapsed after the death of Julius Nepos in 480, although the rulers of the barbarian kingdoms continued to recognize the authority of the Eastern Emperor at least nominally well into the 6th century. While the reconquest of Justinian I had re-established Byzantine presence in the Italian Peninsula, religious frictions existed with the Papacy who sought dominance over the Church of Constantinople. Toward the end of the 8th century, the Papacy still recognised the ruler at Constantinople as the Roman Emperor, though Byzantine military support in Italy had increasingly waned, leading to the Papacy to look to the Franks for protection. In 800 Pope Leo III owed a great debt to Charlemagne, the King of the Franks and King of Italy, for securing his life and position. By this time, the Eastern Emperor Constantine VI had been deposed in 797 and replaced as monarch by his mother, Irene.

Under the pretext that a woman could not rule the empire, Pope Leo III declared the throne vacant and crowned Charlemagne Emperor of the Romans (Imperator Romanorum), the successor of Constantine VI as Roman emperor, using the concept of translatio imperii. On his coins, the name and title used by Charlemagne is Karolus Imperator Augustus. In documents, he used Imperator Augustus Romanum gubernans Imperium ("Emperor Augustus, governing the Roman Empire") and serenissimus Augustus a Deo coronatus, magnus pacificus Imperator Romanorum gubernans Imperium ("most serene Augustus crowned by God, great peaceful emperor governing the empire of the Romans"). The Eastern Empire eventually relented to recognizing Charlemagne and his successors as emperors, but as "Frankish" and "German emperors", at no point referring to them as Roman, a label they reserved for themselves.

The title of emperor in the West implied recognition by the pope. As the power of the papacy grew during the Middle Ages, popes and emperors came into conflict over church administration. The best-known and most bitter conflict was that known as the investiture controversy, fought during the 11th century between Henry IV and Pope Gregory VII.

After the coronation of Charlemagne, his successors maintained the title until the death of Berengar I of Italy in 924. The comparatively brief interregnum between 924 and the coronation of Otto the Great in 962 is taken as marking the transition from the Frankish Empire to the Holy Roman Empire. Under the Ottonians, much of the former Carolingian kingdom of Eastern Francia fell within the boundaries of the Holy Roman Empire.

Since 911, the various German princes had elected the King of the Germans from among their peers. The King of the Germans would then be crowned as emperor following the precedent set by Charlemagne, during the period of 962–1530. Charles V was the last emperor to be crowned by the pope, and his successor, Ferdinand I, merely adopted the title of "Emperor elect" in 1558. The final Holy Roman emperor-elect, Francis II, abdicated in 1806 during the Napoleonic Wars that saw the Empire's final dissolution.

The term sacrum (i.e., "holy") in connection with the German Roman Empire was first used in 1157 under Frederick I Barbarossa.

The Holy Roman Emperor's standard designation was "August Emperor of the Romans" (Romanorum Imperator Augustus). When Charlemagne was crowned in 800, he was styled as "most serene Augustus, crowned by God, great and pacific emperor, governing the Roman Empire," thus constituting the elements of "Holy" and "Roman" in the imperial title.

The word Roman was a reflection of the principle of translatio imperii (or in this case restauratio imperii) that regarded the Holy Roman emperors as the inheritors of the title of emperor of the Western Roman Empire.

In German-language historiography, the term Römisch-deutscher Kaiser ("Roman-German emperor") is used to distinguish the title from that of Roman emperor on one hand, and that of German emperor (Deutscher Kaiser) on the other. The English term "Holy Roman Emperor" is a modern shorthand for "emperor of the Holy Roman Empire" not corresponding to the historical style or title, i.e., the adjective "holy" is not intended as modifying "emperor"; the English term "Holy Roman Emperor" gained currency in the interbellum period (the 1920s to 1930s); formerly the title had also been rendered as "German-Roman emperor" in English.

== Succession ==
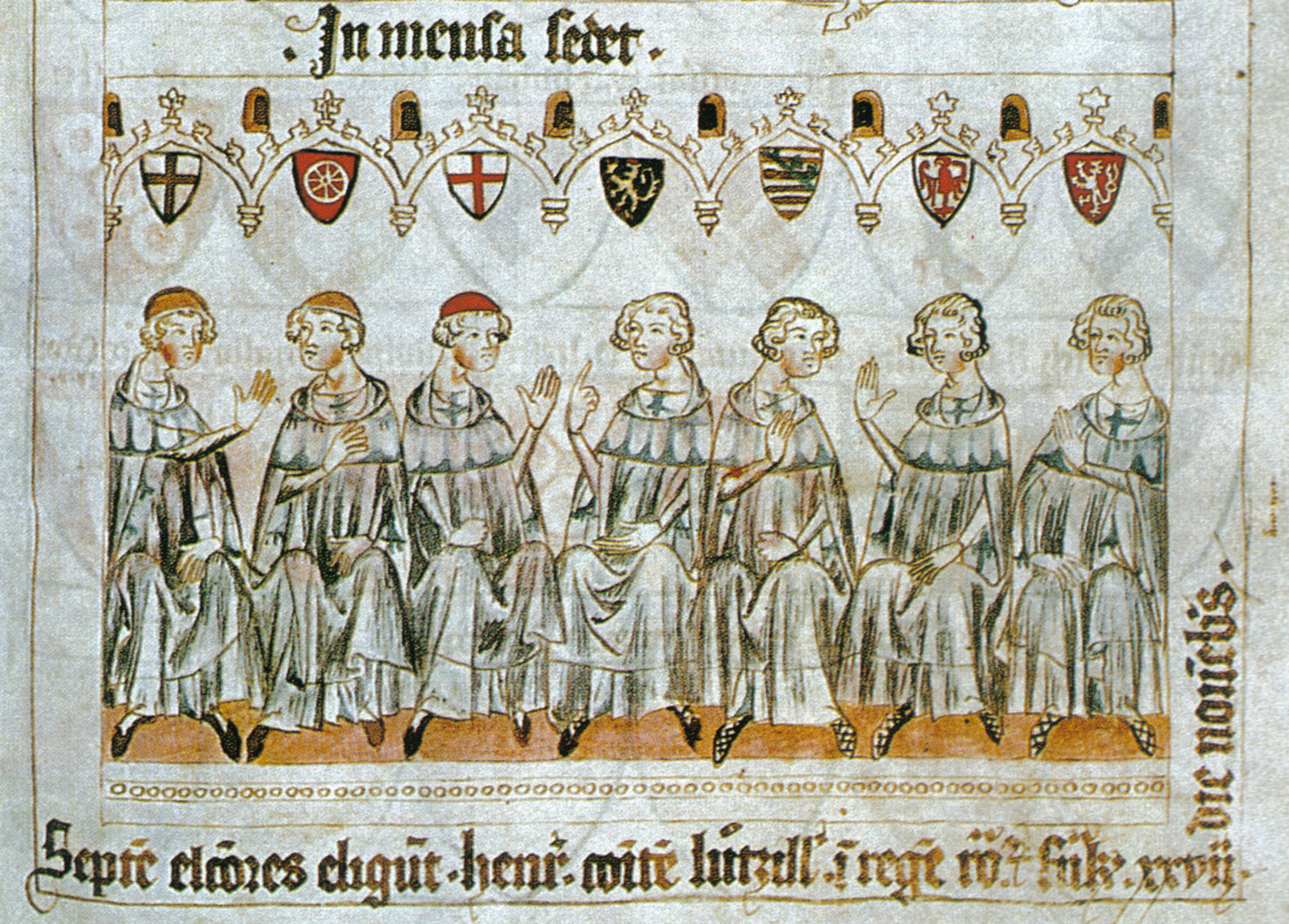
Illustration of the election of Henry VII (27 November 1308) showing (left to right) the Archbishop of Cologne, Archbishop of Mainz, Archbishop of Trier, Count Palatine of the Rhine, Duke of Saxony, Margrave of Brandenburg and King of Bohemia (Codex Balduini Trevirorum, c. 1340).

The elective monarchy of the Kingdom of Germany goes back to the early 10th century, the election of Conrad I of Germany in 911 following the death without issue of Louis the Child, the last Carolingian ruler of Germany. Elections meant the kingship of Germany was only partially hereditary, unlike the kingship of England, although sovereignty frequently remained in a dynasty until there were no more male successors. The process of an election meant that the prime candidate had to make concessions, by which the voters were kept on his side, which was known as Wahlkapitulationen (electoral capitulation).

Conrad was elected by the German dukes, and it is not known precisely when the system of seven prince-electors was established. The papal decree Venerabilem by Innocent III (1202), addressed to Berthold V, Duke of Zähringen, establishes the election procedure by (unnamed) princes of the realm, reserving for the pope the right to approve of the candidates. A letter of Pope Urban IV (1263), in the context of the disputed vote of 1256 and the subsequent interregnum, suggests that by "immemorial custom", seven princes had the right to elect the king and future emperor. The seven prince-electors are named in the Golden Bull of 1356: the archbishop of Mainz, the archbishop of Trier, the archbishop of Cologne, the king of Bohemia, the count palatine of the Rhine, the duke of Saxony and the margrave of Brandenburg.

After 1438, the title remained in the House of Habsburg and Habsburg-Lorraine, with the brief exception of Charles VII, who was a Wittelsbach. Maximilian I (emperor 1508–1519) and his successors no longer traveled to Rome to be crowned as emperor by the pope. Maximilian, therefore, named himself elected Roman emperor (Erwählter Römischer Kaiser) in 1508 with papal approval. This title was in use by all his uncrowned successors. Of his successors, only Charles V, the immediate one, received a papal coronation.

The elector palatine's seat was conferred on the duke of Bavaria in 1621, but in 1648, in the wake of the Thirty Years' War, the elector palatine was restored, as the eighth elector. The Electorate of Hanover was added as a ninth elector in 1692, confirmed by the Imperial Diet in 1708. The whole college was reshuffled in the German mediatization of 1803 with a total of ten electors, a mere three years before the dissolution of the Empire.

== List of emperors ==
This list includes all 47 German monarchs crowned from Charlemagne until the dissolution of the Holy Roman Empire (800–1806).

Several rulers were crowned king of the Romans (king of Germany) but not emperor, although they styled themselves thus, among whom were: Conrad I and Henry the Fowler in the 10th century, and Conrad IV, Rudolf I, Adolf and Albert I during the interregnum of the late 13th century.

Traditional historiography assumes a continuity between the Carolingian Empire and the Holy Roman Empire, while a modern convention takes the coronation of Otto I in 962 as the starting point of the Holy Roman Empire (although the term Sacrum Imperium Romanum was not in use before the 13th century).

=== Roman Emperors ===
On Christmas Day, 800, Charlemagne, King of the Franks, was crowned Emperor of the Romans (Imperator Romanorum) by Pope Leo III, in opposition to Empress Irene, who was then ruling the Roman Empire from Constantinople. Charlemagne's descendants from the Carolingian Dynasty continued to be crowned Emperor until 899, excepting a brief period when the Imperial crown was awarded to the Widonid Dukes of Spoleto. There is some contention as to whether the Holy Roman Empire dates as far back as Charlemagne, some historians consider the Carolingian Empire to be a distinct polity from the later Holy Roman Empire as established under Otto I in 962.

==== 800–888: Carolingian dynasty ====
Portrait	Coat of arms	Name Lifespan	Reign		Relationship with predecessor(s)	Other title(s)
		Charlemagne (Charles I); 748–814	25 December 800	28 January 814	None	King of the Franks; King of the Lombards
		Louis I, the Pious; 778–840	11 September 813	20 June 840	Son of Charles I	King of the Franks; King of Italy; King of Aquitaine
		Lothair I 795–855	5 April 823	29 September 855	Son of Louis I	King of Italy; King of Middle Francia
		Louis II; 825–875	29 September 855	12 August 875	Son of Lothair I	King of Italy
		Charles II, the Bald; 823–877	25 December 875	6 October 877	Son of Louis I, younger half-brother of Lothair I	King of West Francia; King of Italy
		Charles III, the Fat; 839–888	12 February 881	13 January 888	Grandson of Louis I, nephew of Charles the Bald	King of West Francia; King of East Francia; King of Italy

==== 891–898: Widonid dynasty ====
Portrait	Name Lifespan	Reign		Relationship with predecessor(s)	Other title(s)
	Guy ?–894	21 February 891	12 December 894	2nd Great-grandson of Charles I	King of Italy; Duke of Spoleto
	Lambert; 880–898	30 April 892	15 October 898	Son of Guy	King of Italy; Duke of Spoleto

==== 896–899: Carolingian dynasty ====
Portrait	Coat of arms	Name Lifespan	Reign		Relationship with predecessor(s)	Other title(s)
		Arnulf; 850–899	22 February 896	8 December 899	Nephew of Charles III; Great-grandson of Louis I	King of Italy; King of East Francia

==== 901–905: Bosonid dynasty (Carolingian by adoption) ====
Portrait	Name Lifespan	Reign		Relationship with predecessor(s)	Other title(s)
	Louis III, the Blind; 880–928	22 February 901	21 July 905	Grandson of Louis II Adopted son of Charles III	King of Italy; King of Provence

==== 915–924: Unruoching dynasty ====
Portrait	Name Lifespan	Reign		Relationship with predecessor(s)	Other title(s)
	Berengar; 845–924	December 915	7 April 924	Grandson of Louis I	King of Italy; Margrave of Friuli

=== Holy Roman Emperors ===
While earlier Frankish and Italian monarchs had been crowned as Roman emperors, the actual Holy Roman Empire is often considered to have begun with the crowning of Frederick Barbarossa who called the empire "the holy empire", however in general it is already attributed to Otto I, at the time Otto was Duke of Saxony and King of Germany. Because the King of Germany was an elected position, being elected King of Germany was functionally a pre-requisite to being crowned Holy Roman Emperor. By the 13th century, the Prince-electors became formalized as a specific body of seven electors, consisting of three bishops and four secular princes. Up to the mid-14th century, the electors chose freely from among a number of dynasties. A period of dispute during the second half of the 13th century over the kingship of Germany led to there being no emperor crowned for several decades, though this ended in 1312 with the coronation of Henry VII, Holy Roman Emperor. The period of free election ended with the ascension of the Austrian House of Habsburg, as an unbroken line of Habsburgs held the imperial throne until the 18th century. Later a cadet branch known as the House of Habsburg-Lorraine passed it from father to son until the abolition of the Empire in 1806. Notably, from the 16th century, the Habsburgs dispensed with the requirement that emperors be crowned by the pope before exercising their office. Starting with Ferdinand I, all successive emperors forwent the traditional coronation.

==== 962–1024: Ottonian dynasty ====
Portrait	Coat of arms	Name Lifespan	Term as King began	Term as Emperor began	Term(s) ended	Relationship with predecessor(s)	Other title(s)
		Otto I, the Great; 912–973	7 August 936	2 February 962	7 May 973	None	King of Italy; King of Germany; Duke of Saxony
		Otto II, the Red; 955–983	26 May 961	25 December 967	7 December 983	Son of Otto I (Note: crowned co-emperor as heir to his father)	King of Italy; King of Germany
		Otto III; 980–1002	25 December 983	21 May 996	23 January 1002	Son of Otto II	King of Italy; King of Germany
		Henry II (Note: Enumerated as successor of Henry I who was German King 919–936 but not Emperor.); 973–1024	7 June 1002	14 February 1014	13 July 1024	Second cousin of Otto III, grandnephew of Otto I, 7th generation descendant of Louis the Pious (Note: Descent through Judith of Sülichgau)	King of Italy; King of Germany; Duke of Bavaria; Duke of Carinthia

==== 1027–1125: Salian dynasty ====
Portrait	Name Lifespan	Term as King began	Term as Emperor began	Term(s) ended	Relationship with predecessor(s)	Other title(s)
	Conrad II, the Elder (Note: Enumerated as successor of Conrad I who was German King 911–918 but not Emperor); 990–1039	8 September 1024	26 March 1027	4 June 1039	2nd Great-grandson of Otto I and Eadgyth of England through Liutgarde, Duchess of Lorraine	King of Burgundy; King of Italy; King of Germany
	Henry III; 1017–1056	14 April 1028	25 December 1046	5 October 1056	Son of Conrad II, 7th generation descendant of emperor Charles II through his Carolingian great-grandmother Matilda of France	King of Burgundy; King of Italy; King of Germany; Duke of Bavaria; Duke of Swabia; Duke of Carinthia; Margrave of Meissen
	Henry IV; 1050–1106	17 July 1054	1 April 1084	7 August 1106	Son of Henry III	King of Burgundy; King of Italy; King of Germany; Duke of Bavaria
	Henry V 1086–1125	6 January 1099	13 April 1111	23 May 1125	Son of Henry IV	King of Italy; King of Germany; King of Burgundy

==== 1133–1137: Supplinburg dynasty ====
Portrait	Name Lifespan	Term as King began	Term as Emperor began	Term(s) ended	Relationship with predecessor(s)	Other title(s)
	Lothair II (Note: Enumerated also Lothair III as successor of Lothair II of Italy, who was King of Italy from 947–950 but not Emperor); 1075–1137	30 August 1125	4 June 1133	4 December 1137	None	King of Italy; King of Germany; King of Burgundy; Duke of Saxony

==== 1155–1197: Staufen dynasty ====
Portrait	Coat of arms	Name Lifespan	Term as King began	Term as Emperor began	Term(s) ended	Relationship with predecessor(s)	Other title(s)
		Frederick I Barbarossa; 1122–1190	4 March 1152	18 June 1155	10 June 1190	Great-grandson of Henry IV through Agnes of Waiblingen; Descendant of Otto II through Matilda of Germany	King of Germany; King of Italy; King of Burgundy
		Henry VI; 1165–1197	15 August 1169	14 April 1191	28 September 1197	Son of Frederick I	King of Germany; King of Italy; King of Burgundy; Co-King of Sicily

==== 1209–1215: Welf dynasty ====
Portrait	Coat of arms	Name Lifespan	Term as King began	Term as Emperor began	Term(s) ended	Relationship with predecessor(s)	Other title(s)
		Otto IV; 1175–1218	9 June 1198	21 October 1209	1215	Great-grandson of Lothair II through Gertrude of Süpplingenburg	King of Germany; King of Italy; King of Burgundy

==== 1220–1250: Staufen dynasty ====
Portrait	Coat of arms	Name Lifespan	Term as King began	Term as Emperor began	Term(s) ended	Relationship with predecessor(s)	Other title(s)
		Frederick II, Stupor Mundi 1194–1250	5 December 1212	22 November 1220	13 December 1250	Son of Henry VI	King of Germany; King of Italy; King of Sicily; King of Jerusalem

The interregnum of the Holy Roman Empire is taken to have lasted from the deposition of Frederick II by Pope Innocent IV in 1245 (or alternatively from Frederick's death in 1250 or from the death of Conrad IV in 1254) to the election of Rudolf I of Germany (1273). Rudolf was not crowned emperor, nor were his successors Adolf and Albert. The next emperor was Henry VII, crowned on 29 June 1312 by legates of Pope Clement V.

==== 1312–1313: House of Luxembourg ====
Portrait	Coat of arms	Name Lifespan	Term as King began	Term as Emperor began	Term(s) ended	Relationship with predecessor(s)	Other title(s)
		Henry VII; 1273–1313	27 November 1308	29 June 1312	24 August 1313	Descendant of emperor Berengar I, (Note: Descent through his great-grandmother Margaret II, Countess of Flanders, whose direct ancestor Baldwin IV, Count of Flanders was the grandson of Berengar II of Italy, the grandson of emperor Berengar I) Descendant of Charles II	King of Germany; King of Italy; Count of Luxemburg

==== 1328–1347: House of Wittelsbach ====
Portrait	Coat of arms	Name Lifespan	Term as King began	Term as Emperor began	Term(s) ended	Relationship with predecessor(s)	Other title(s)
		Louis IV, the Bavarian; 1282–1347	20 October 1314	17 January 1328	11 October 1347	Descendant of Otto II (through Matilda of Germany), Henry IV (through Agnes of Waiblingen) and Lothair II (through Gertrude of Süpplingenburg)	King of Germany; King of Italy; Duke of Bavaria

==== 1355–1437: House of Luxembourg ====
Portrait	Coat of arms	Name Lifespan	Term as King began	Term as Emperor began	Term(s) ended	Relationship with predecessor(s)	Other title(s)
		Charles IV; 1316–1378	11 July 1346	5 April 1355	29 November 1378	Grandson of Henry VII; Descendant of Frederick I through Philip of Swabia	King of Germany; King of Italy; King of Bohemia; King of Burgundy; Count of Luxemburg; King of the Lombards
		Sigismund; 1368–1437	10 September 1410 /21 July 1411	31 May 1433	9 December 1437	Son of Charles IV	King of Germany; King of Italy; King of Bohemia; King of Hungary and Croatia

==== 1452–1740: House of Habsburg ====
In 1508, Pope Julius II allowed Maximilian I to use the title of Emperor without coronation in Rome, though the title was qualified as Electus Romanorum Imperator ("elected Emperor of the Romans"). Maximilian's successors each adopted the same titulature, usually on becoming the sole ruler of the Holy Roman Empire. Maximilian's predecessor Frederick III was the last to be crowned Emperor by the Pope in Rome, while Maximilian's successor Charles V was the last to be crowned by the pope, though in Bologna, in 1530.

Portrait	Coat of arms	Name Lifespan	Term as King began	Term as Emperor began	Term(s) ended	Relationship with predecessor(s)	Other title(s)
		Frederick III, the Peaceful; 1415–1493	2 February 1440	16 March 1452	19 August 1493	Second cousin of Albert II of Germany, Emperor designate Descendant of Frederick I (through Otto I, Count of Burgundy); Descendant of Lothair II (through Gertrude of Süpplingenburg)	King of Germany; King of Italy; Archduke of Austria
		Maximilian I 1459–1519	16 February 1486	4 February 1508	12 January 1519	Son of Frederick III; Descendant of Frederick II through Manfred, King of Sicily	King of Germany; Archduke of Austria
		Charles V 1500–1558	28 June 1519		27 August 1556	Grandson of Maximilian I	King of Germany; King of Italy; Archduke of Austria; King of Spain; Lord of the Netherlands and Duke of Burgundy
		Ferdinand I 1503–1564	5 January 1531	27 August 1556	25 July 1564	Brother of Charles V Grandson of Maximilian I	King of Germany; King of Bohemia; King of Hungary; King of Croatia; Archduke of Austria
		Maximilian II; 1527–1576	22 November 1562	25 July 1564	12 October 1576	Son of Ferdinand I Descendant of Sigismund through Elizabeth of Luxembourg	King of Germany; King of Bohemia; King of Hungary; King of Croatia; Archduke of Austria
		Rudolf II (Note: Enumerated as successor of Rudolph I who was German King 1273–1291.); 1552–1612	27 October 1575	12 October 1576	20 January 1612	Son of Maximilian II; Grandson of Charles V	King of Germany; King of Bohemia; King of Hungary; King of Croatia; Archduke of Austria
		Matthias; 1557–1619	13 June 1612		20 March 1619	Brother of Rudolf II; Son of Maximilian II; Grandson of Charles V	King of Germany; King of Bohemia; King of Hungary; King of Croatia; Archduke of Austria
		Ferdinand II; 1578–1637	28 August 1619		15 February 1637	Cousin of Rudolf II and Matthias; Grandson of Ferdinand I	King of Germany; King of Bohemia; King of Hungary; King of Croatia; Archduke of Austria
		Ferdinand III; 1608–1657	22 December 1636	15 February 1637	2 April 1657	Son of Ferdinand II	King of Germany; King of Bohemia; King of Hungary; King of Croatia; Archduke of Austria
		Leopold I 1640–1705	18 July 1658		5 May 1705	Son of Ferdinand III; Great-great-grandson of Charles V and Maximilian II	King of Germany; King of Bohemia; King of Hungary; King of Croatia; Archduke of Austria
		Joseph I 1678–1711	23 January 1690	5 May 1705	17 April 1711	Son of Leopold I	King of Germany; King of Bohemia; King of Hungary; King of Croatia; Archduke of Austria
		Charles VI; 1685–1740	12 October 1711		20 October 1740	Brother of Joseph I Son of Leopold I	Full list: King of Germany; King of Bohemia; King of Hungary; King of Croatia; Archduke of Austria; King of Naples; King of Sicily; King of Sardinia; Duke of Luxemburg; Duke of Teschen; Duke of Parma and Piacenza; Count of Flanders

==== 1742–1745: House of Wittelsbach ====
Portrait	Coat of arms	Name Lifespan	Term as King began	Term as Emperor began	Term(s) ended	Relationship with predecessor(s)	Other title(s)
		Charles VII; 1697–1745	24 January 1742		20 January 1745	Great-great-grandson of Ferdinand II; Son-in-law of Joseph I	King of Germany; King of Bohemia; Elector of Bavaria

==== 1745–1765: House of Lorraine ====
Portrait	Coat of arms	Name Lifespan	Term as King began	Term as Emperor began	Term(s) ended	Relationship with predecessor(s)	Other title(s)
		Francis I 1708–1765	13 September 1745		18 August 1765	Great-grandson of Ferdinand III; Son-in-law of Charles VI	King of Germany; Archduke of Austria; Grand Duke of Tuscany; Duke of Lorraine

==== 1765–1806: House of Habsburg-Lorraine ====
Portrait	Coat of arms	Name Lifespan	Term as King began	Term as Emperor began	Term(s) ended	Relationship with predecessor(s)	Other title(s)
		Joseph II; 1741–1790	27 March 1764	18 August 1765	20 February 1790	Son of Francis I and Empress Maria Theresa of Austria (Note: de facto ruler of the empire); Grandson of Charles VI	King of Germany; King of Bohemia; King of Hungary and Croatia; Archduke of Austria
		Leopold II; 1747–1792	30 September 1790		1 March 1792	Brother of Joseph II	King of Germany; King of Bohemia; King of Hungary and Croatia; Archduke of Austria; Grand Duke of Tuscany
		Francis II; 1768–1835	5 July 1792		6 August 1806	Son of Leopold II	King of Germany; King of Bohemia; King of Hungary and Croatia; Archduke of Austria; Emperor of Austria

== Coronation ==
The Emperor was crowned in a special ceremony, traditionally performed by the Pope in Rome. Without that coronation, no king, despite exercising all powers, could call himself Emperor. In 1508, Pope Julius II allowed Maximilian I to use the title of Emperor without coronation in Rome, though the title was qualified as Electus Romanorum Imperator ("elected Emperor of the Romans"). Maximilian's successors adopted the same titulature, usually when they became the sole ruler of the Holy Roman Empire. Maximilian's first successor Charles V was the last to be crowned Emperor.

Emperor	Coronation date	Officiant	Location
Charles I	25 December 800	Pope Leo III	Rome, Italy
Louis I	5 October 816	Pope Stephen IV	Reims, France
Lothair I	5 April 823	Pope Paschal I	Rome, Italy
Louis II	15 June 844	Pope Leo IV	Rome, Italy
Charles II	29 December 875	Pope John VIII	Rome, Italy
Charles III	12 February 881	Pope John VIII	Rome, Italy
Guy III of Spoleto	21 February 891	Pope Stephen V	Rome, Italy
Lambert II of Spoleto	30 April 892	Pope Formosus	Ravenna, Italy
Arnulf of Carinthia	22 February 896	Pope Formosus	Rome, Italy
Louis III	15 or 22 February 901	Pope Benedict IV	Rome, Italy
Berengar	December 915	Pope John X	Rome, Italy
Otto I	2 February 962	Pope John XII	Rome, Italy
Otto II	25 December 967	Pope John XIII	Rome, Italy
Otto III	21 May 996	Pope Gregory V	Monza, Italy
Henry II	14 February 1014	Pope Benedict VIII	Rome, Italy
Conrad II	26 March 1027	Pope John XIX	Rome, Italy
Henry III	25 December 1046	Pope Clement II	Rome, Italy
Henry IV	31 March 1084	Antipope Clement III	Rome, Italy
Henry V	13 April 1111	Pope Paschal II	Rome, Italy
Lothair III	4 June 1133	Pope Innocent II	Rome, Italy
Frederick I	18 June 1155	Pope Adrian IV	Rome, Italy
Henry VI	14 April 1191	Pope Celestine III	Rome, Italy
Otto IV	4 October 1209	Pope Innocent III	Rome, Italy
Frederick II	22 November 1220	Pope Honorius III	Rome, Italy
Henry VII	29 June 1312	Ghibellines cardinals	Rome, Italy
Louis IV	17 January 1328	Senator Sciarra Colonna	Rome, Italy
Charles IV	5 April 1355	Pope Innocent VI's cardinal	Rome, Italy
Sigismund	31 May 1433	Pope Eugenius IV	Rome, Italy
Frederick III	19 March 1452	Pope Nicholas V	Rome, Italy
Charles V	24 February 1530	Pope Clement VII	Bologna, Italy

== See also ==
- Concordat of Worms
- Emperor for other uses of the title "Emperor" in Europe
- First Council of the Lateran
- Holy Roman Emperors family tree
- Holy Roman Empress
- King of the Romans
- List of German monarchs
- Holy Roman Empire
- King of Italy
- Kingdom of Italy (Holy Roman Empire)
