= 1792 imperial election =

Election of Francis II as Holy Roman Emperor in 1792

1792 Imperial election
- July 5, 1792

8 Prince-electors 5 votes needed to win
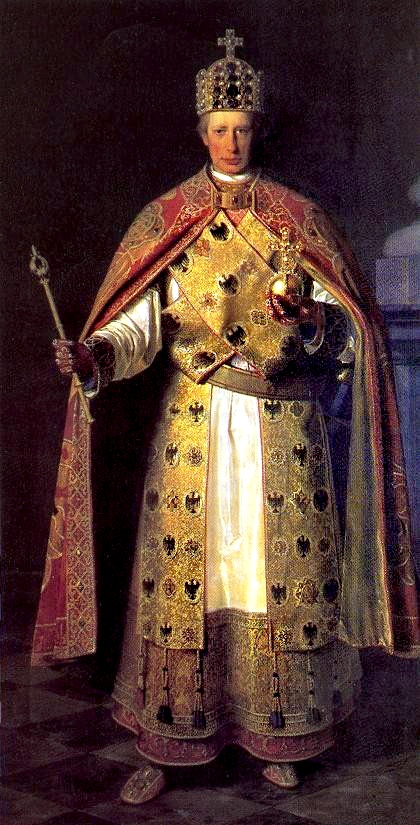
Candidate	Francis II
House	Habsburg
Electoral vote	8
Percentage	100%
Emperor before election
Leopold II
House of Habsburg
Elected Emperor
Francis II
House of Habsburg

The 1792 imperial election, held on 5 July 1792 in Frankfurt, elected Francis of the House of Habsburg as the final Holy Roman Emperor, succeeding his father, Leopold II, who died on 1 March 1792. The seven prince-electors unanimously chose Francis.

== Background ==
The Holy Roman Empire’s elective monarchy, established by the Golden Bull of 1356, tasked seven prince-electors with selecting the King of the Romans, typically crowned Holy Roman Emperor. The electors in 1792 were:

- Friedrich Karl Joseph von Erthal, Archbishop of Mainz
- Clemens Wenceslaus of Saxony, Archbishop of Trier
- Maximilian Francis of Austria, Archbishop of Cologne
- Francis, King of Bohemia
- Charles Theodore, Elector of Bavaria
- Frederick Augustus I of Saxony, Elector of Saxony
- Frederick William II of Prussia, Elector of Brandenburg

Leopold II’s death on 1 March 1792, during the French Revolution and Great Turkish War, necessitated the election. Leopold’s Declaration of Pillnitz (1791) had escalated tensions with France, leading to the War of the First Coalition in April 1792. Francis, Leopold’s son and King of Hungary, was the sole candidate, supported by Habsburg tradition.

== Election results ==
The election took place in Frankfurt on 5 July 1792. Francis, as King of Bohemia, voted. The seven electors unanimously elected Francis, who was crowned King of the Romans in Frankfurt on 14 July 1792.

Elector	Title	Vote
Friedrich Karl Joseph von Erthal	Archbishop of Mainz	Francis II
Clemens Wenceslaus of Saxony	Archbishop of Trier	Francis II
Maximilian Francis of Austria	Archbishop of Cologne	Francis II
Francis (as King of Bohemia)	King of Bohemia	Francis II
Charles Theodore, Elector of Bavaria	Elector of Bavaria	Francis II
Frederick Augustus III of Saxony	Elector of Saxony	Francis II
Frederick William II of Prussia	Elector of Brandenburg	Francis II
George III of Great Britain (Note: George III was represented by the Hanoverian electoral ambassadors Ludwig Friedrich von Beulwitz and Dietrich Heinrich Ludwig von Ompteda.)	Elector of Hanover	Francis II
Total		8 votes, 100% (unanimous)

== Aftermath ==
Francis II faced immediate challenges in the War of the First Coalition, defending the Empire against revolutionary France. His reign ended with the Holy Roman Empire’s dissolution in 1806 under pressure from Napoleon, making the 1792 election the final imperial election.

== See also ==
- List of imperial elections in the Holy Roman Empire
- Holy Roman Emperor
- Prince-elector
- Golden Bull of 1356
- House of Habsburg
