= Caecilii Metelli family tree =

Roman family tree

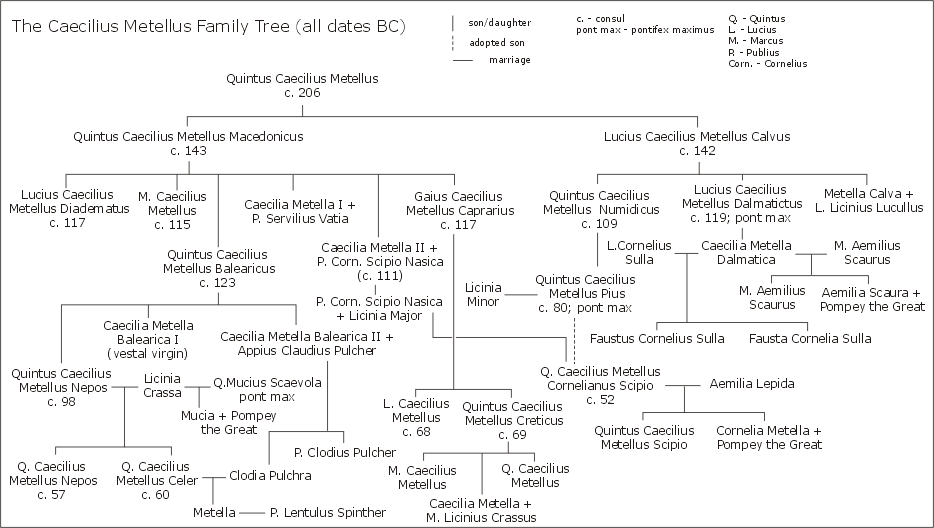
Caecilii Metelli family tree

The Caecilii Metelli were one of the most important families of the late Roman Republic. They rose to prominence in the beginning of the third century, with the consulship of Lucius Caecilius Metellus Denter in 284 BC. It was however Quintus Caecilius Metellus, consul in 143, who greatly improved the prestige of the family, notably thanks to his victory during the Fourth Macedonian War, for which he received the agnomen Macedonicus. His descendants and those of his younger brother Lucius received an astonishing number of magistracies during the last century of the Republic.

== Stemma ==
The overall structure of the stemma is taken from the one drawn by Münzer in the Realencyclopädie, which has recently been reproduced by Karl-J. Hölkeskamp. T. P. Wiseman made some important corrections in two articles on the descendants of Balearicus and the later Metelli, which have been included.

The nomen Caecilius is omitted for all the men named Metellus. All dates are BC, except stated otherwise. Numbers in brackets indicates the order of marriages. Dotted lines show adoptions.

Legend
Orange	Dictator	Yellow	Censor	Green	Consul

C. Metellus
L. Metellus Denter cos. 284
L. Metellus cos. 251, 247 dict. 224
L. Metellus tr. pl. 213	Q. Metellus cos. 206 dict. 205	M. Metellus pr. 206
Q. Metellus; Macedonicus cos. 143 cens. 131	L. Metellus; Calvus cos. 142
Q. Metellus; Balearicus cos. 123 cens. 120	L. Metellus; Diadematus cos. 117 cens. 115	M. Metellus cos. 115	Metella ~ C. Servilius; Vatia	C. Metellus Capriarus cos. 113 cens. 102	Metella ~ P. Cornelius; Scipio; Nasica	Metella ~ L. Licinius Lucullus	Q. Metellus Numidicus cos. 109 cens. 102	L. Metellus Delmaticus cos. 119
Metella	Q. Metellus; Nepos cos. 98	Q. Metellus; Celer tr. pl. 90	Metella ~ Ap. Claudius; Pulcher cos. 79	C. Metellus sen. 82	M. Metellus pr. 69	L. Metellus cos. 68	Q. Metellus; Creticus cos. 69	P. Cornelius; Scipio; Nasica pr. 93	Q. Metellus; Pius cos. 80	Metella ~ L. Cornelius; Sulla
Q. Metellus; Nepos cos. 57	Q. Metellus; Celer cos. 60	Clodia	P. Clodius; Pulcher	L. Metellus tr. pl. 49	L. Metellus tr. pl. 55	Metella ~ M. Licinius; Crassus	Q. Metellus; Scipio cos. 52
Metella = L. Cornelius Lentulus q. 44	Q. Metellus procos. 6 AD
Q. Metellus; Creticus Silanus cos. 7 AD
Nero Julius Caesar	Junia

== Bibliography ==
- T. Robert S. Broughton, The Magistrates of the Roman Republic, American Philological Association, 1952–1960.
- August Pauly, Georg Wissowa, Friedrich Münzer, et alii, Realencyclopädie der Classischen Altertumswissenschaft (abbreviated PW), J. B. Metzler, Stuttgart, 1894–1980.
- Christopher Smith, Kaj Sandberg (editors), Omnium Annalium Monumenta: Historical Writing and Historical Evidence in Republican Rome, Leiden & Boston, Brill, 2017.
- T. P. Wiseman, "The Last of the Metelli", Latomus, T. 24, Fasc. 1 (Jan. 1965), pp. 52–61.
- ——, "Celer and Nepos", The Classical Quarterly, 2, Vol. 21, No. 1 (May, 1971), pp. 180–182.
