= Gaius Porcius Cato (consul 114 BC) =

Roman senator and general

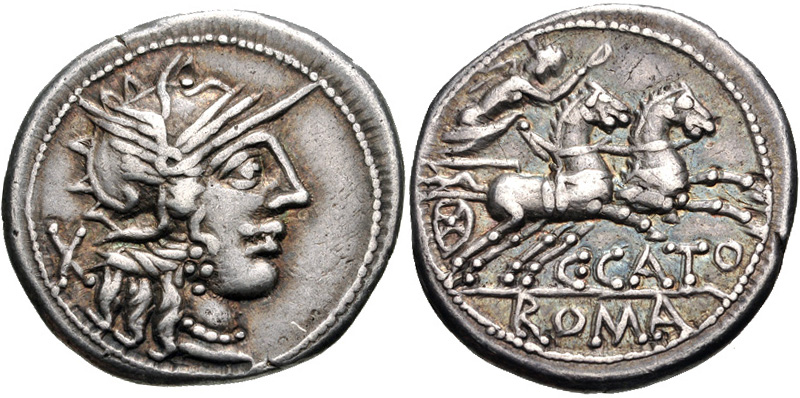
Denarius minted by Gaius Cato in 123 BC. On the obverse is Roma, while the reverse shows Victoria driving a biga.

Gaius Porcius Cato (Note: His name is hereafter shortened to Gaius, as this praenomen was particularly rare among the Porcii.) (before 157 BC – after 109 BC in Tarraco) was a Roman politician and general, notably consul in 114 BC. He was the son of Marcus Porcius Cato Licinianus and grandson of Cato the Censor.

Initially a friend of the Gracchi brothers, Gaius betrayed Gaius Gracchus in the late 120s BC. He became consul in 114, but was crushed by the Scordisci in Thrace. His defeat led to a religious hysteria at Rome, and he was sentenced to pay a fine at his return. He was sued again in 109 before the Mamilian commission, which investigated possible bribes received by Roman politicians from the Numidian King Jugurtha. In fact the commission's members were former supporters of the Gracchi and made Gaius pay for his betrayal by forcing him into exile. Gaius left for Tarraco (modern Tarragona) in Spain, and became a citizen of that town.

== Family background ==
Gaius Cato belonged to the plebeian gens Porcia, which became prominent at the beginning of the second century thanks to Cato the Censor, the grandfather of Gaius. Born before 157, his parents were Marcus Porcius Cato Licinianus and Aemilia Tertia, the youngest daughter of Aemilius Paullus. As a result, Gaius was the nephew of Scipio Aemilianus, the eldest son of Aemilius Paullus and natural brother of his mother. In addition, Gaius was the younger brother of Marcus Porcius Cato, consul in 118, who died during his office.

== Career ==
=== Early career ===
Gaius is first mentioned in the sources as a supporter of Tiberius Gracchus, the famous social reformer and tribune of the plebs in 133. Gaius probably met him within the Scipionic Circle—the literate court of Scipio Aemilianus—as Tiberius was also Scipio's brother-in-law. Gaius first recorded position was as triumvir monetalis in 123, the year of the first tribunate of Gaius Gracchus, which suggests he also supported Tiberius' younger brother. It seems that he deserted the cause of the Gracchi soon after though, as he was later prosecuted by a Gracchan court. Cicero describes him as a "mediocre orator".

Nothing is known of his activities until his consulship in 114, but Gaius was surely praetor by 117, as the Lex Villia required a three-year wait between holding magistracies. His province was likely Sicily, as Cicero tells that Gaius' baggage was confiscated by the Mamertines, the inhabitants of Messina. The reason is unknown, but Gaius was likely either on his way to or from his post in Syracuse. Before an article published by Ernst Badian in 1993, the academic consensus was that Gaius lost his baggage c.110 on his way to serve as legate in Numidia during the Jugurthine War, but former consuls serving as legates are extremely rare, and it is more likely that Gaius was praetor in Sicily in 117.

=== Consulship (114 BC) ===
Gaius was elected consul in 114, alongside the other plebeian Manius Acilius Balbus. He is described as consul posterior while Balbus is consul prior, which means the Centuriate Assembly elected Balbus first. Erich Gruen considers that Gaius was a supporter of the conservative Caecilii Metelli—the most powerful family at the time—even though Gaius Caecilius Metellus Caprarius was also candidate in the consular elections that year. T. R. S. Broughton however suggests that Caprarius could have withdrawn his candidacy.

Gaius was assigned Macedonia as his province, which was normally given to a praetor, but a war against the Scordisci—a Celtic or Illyrian tribe from east Serbia—had broken out and a consul was needed. During the summer Gaius nevertheless suffered a crushing defeat against the Scordisci in northern Thrace, who then could enter Roman territory as far as Delphi and the Adriatic. It was the first major Roman defeat in a generation.

The disaster triggered a "religious hysteria" at Rome, with a return to human sacrifice for the last time in Roman history. Two couples (one Greek and one Celtic) were therefore buried alive under the Forum Boarium. The defeat also led to the Trial of the Vestal Virgins, in which three vestals were accused of incestum. One vestal was sentenced to death in 114, but the acquittal of the other two was not accepted, and a tribune of the plebs forced their retrial in 113, which resulted in their death as well.

=== Trials and exile (113–109 BC) ===
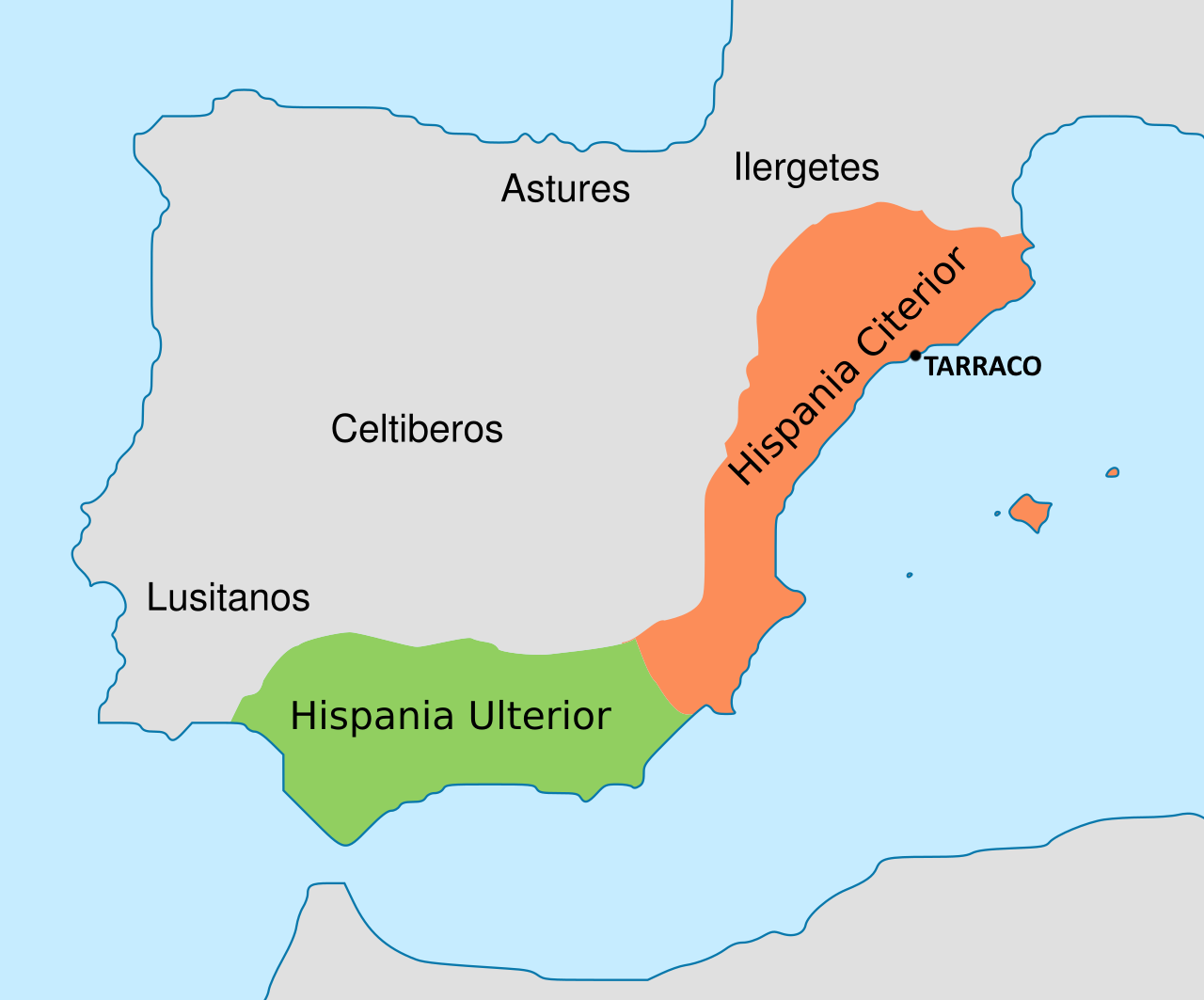
Location of Tarraco in Hispania Citerior.

As was customary with defeated commanders, Gaius was not prorogued in his province and returned to Rome in 113. He was sued at his return for extortion under the provision of the Lex Acilia repetundarum. The sentence was particularly lenient, with a fine of only 8,000 sesterces. Gaius probably benefited from the support of influential friends to escape harsher punishment, but perhaps the plaintiffs were Macedonian provincials—which would mean that Gaius was only sued for some minor damages he caused in the province and not his defeat against the Scordisci, hence the mild verdict.

Apparently, Gaius did not suffer from this conviction. He kept his seat in the Senate and remained politically active, as he was sued again in 109 by the Mamilian commission—named after the tribune of the plebs Gaius Mamilius Limetanus. Officially, this special court was set up to investigate the bribes received by Roman politicians from Jugurtha, the King of Numidia, against whom Rome had been at war since 112. However, the jurors were all equites and the targeted individuals were men associated with the demise of the Gracchi (the equites had been made jurors in the criminal courts by Gaius Gracchus). The first man prosecuted was therefore Lucius Opimius, the consul who in 121 had ordered the murder of Gaius Gracchus and his supporters. Then followed Lucius Calpurnius Bestia (consul in 111), Gaius Sulpicius Galba, Spurius Postumius Albinus (perhaps the consul of 110), and thus Gaius Porcius Cato—who all can be linked to the Gracchi, as enemies or turncoats. Cicero makes it clear that they owed their condemnation to the Gracchan background of the jurors. Gaius may have not even waited for the result of the trial and went into exile.

Unlike most other exiled Romans, Gaius did not move to another city in Italy or the Greek East, but went instead to the less civilised Tarraco in Hispania Citerior, because the Porcii Catones had been the patrons of the city ever since Cato the Censor had served as consul and proconsul in Spain in 195–194. The name Porcius is more frequently encountered on inscriptions in the area, an indication of the Catones' influence over the town. Gaius' choice shows that he did not expect to be restored, because other exiles often remained closer to Italy in order to lobby for their return, such as Lucius Opimius who settled to Dyrrachium (now Durrës in Albania). Gaius received the citizenship of Tarraco, and presumably died there.

Gaius was possibly the grandfather of Gaius Porcius Cato, tribune of the plebs in 56 BC.

== Bibliography ==
=== Ancient sources ===
- Cicero, Brutus, Laelius De Amictia (translation on Wikisource), In Verrem (translation by C. D. Yonge on Wikisource), Pro Balbo.

=== Modern sources ===
- Michael C. Alexander, Trials in the Late Roman Republic, 149 BC to 50 BC, University of Toronto Press, 1990, ISBN 9780802057877.
- Ernst Badian, Foreign Clientelae (264–70 B.C.), Oxford, Clarendon Press, 1958, ISBN 978-0198142041.
- ——, "The Legend of the Legate Who Lost His Luggage", Historia: Zeitschrift für Alte Geschichte, 1993, Bd. 42, H. 2, pp. 203–210.
- T. Corey Brennan, The Praetorship in the Roman Republic, Oxford University Press, 2000, ISBN 9780195114607.
- T. Robert S. Broughton, The Magistrates of the Roman Republic, American Philological Association, 1951–1952.
- ——, "Candidates Defeated in Roman Elections: Some Ancient Roman "Also-Rans"", Transactions of the American Philosophical Society, New Series, 1991, Vol. 81, No. 4, pp. i–vi+1–64.
- Craige Brian Champion, The Peace of the Gods: Elite Religious Practices in the Middle Roman Republic, Princeton University Press, 2017, ISBN 978-0691174853.
- Michael Crawford, Roman Republican Coinage, Cambridge University Press, 1974, ISBN 9780521074926.
- A. M. Eckstein, "Human Sacrifice and Fear of Military Disaster in Republican Rome", in American Journal of Ancient History, 1982, n°7, pp. 69–95.
- Erich S. Gruen, Roman Politics and the Criminal Courts, 149–78 B.C., Cambridge, MA, Harvard University Press, 1978, ISBN 0-674-28420-8.
- Gordon P. Kelly, A History of Exile in the Roman Republic, Cambridge University Press, 2006, ISBN 9780511584558.
- Robert C. Knapp, "The Origins of Provincial Prosopography in the West", Ancient Society, 1978, Vol. 9, pp. 187–222.
- August Pauly, Georg Wissowa, Elimar Klebs, Friedrich Münzer, Franz Miltner, et alii, Realencyclopädie der Classischen Altertumswissenschaft (abbreviated RE), J. B. Metzler, Stuttgart, 1894–1980.
- Nathan Rosenstein, Imperatores Victi, Military Defeat and Aristocratic Competition in the Middle and Late Republic, Berkeley, University of California Press, 1990, ISBN 978-0520069398.
- A. N. Sherwin-White, "The Extortion Procedure Again", The Journal of Roman Studies, 1952, Vol. 42, Parts 1 and 2, pp. 43–55.
- Graham Vincent Sumner, The Orators in Cicero's Brutus: Prosopography and Chronology, (Phoenix Supplementary Volume XI.), Toronto and Buffalo, University of Toronto Press, 1973, ISBN 978-0802052810.
- Lily Ross Taylor and T. Robert S. Broughton, "The Order of the Two Consuls' Names in the Yearly Lists", Memoirs of the American Academy in Rome, 1949, 19, pp. 3–14.
- John Wilkes, The Illyrians, Oxford, Blackwell, 1995, ISBN 978-0631198079.

Political offices
| Preceded by M. Aemilius Scaurus; M. Caecilius Metellus | Roman consul 114 BC; With: Manius Acilius Balbus | Succeeded by C. Caecilius Metellus Caprarius; Cn. Papirius Carbo |
