= Caecilia gens =

Ancient Roman family

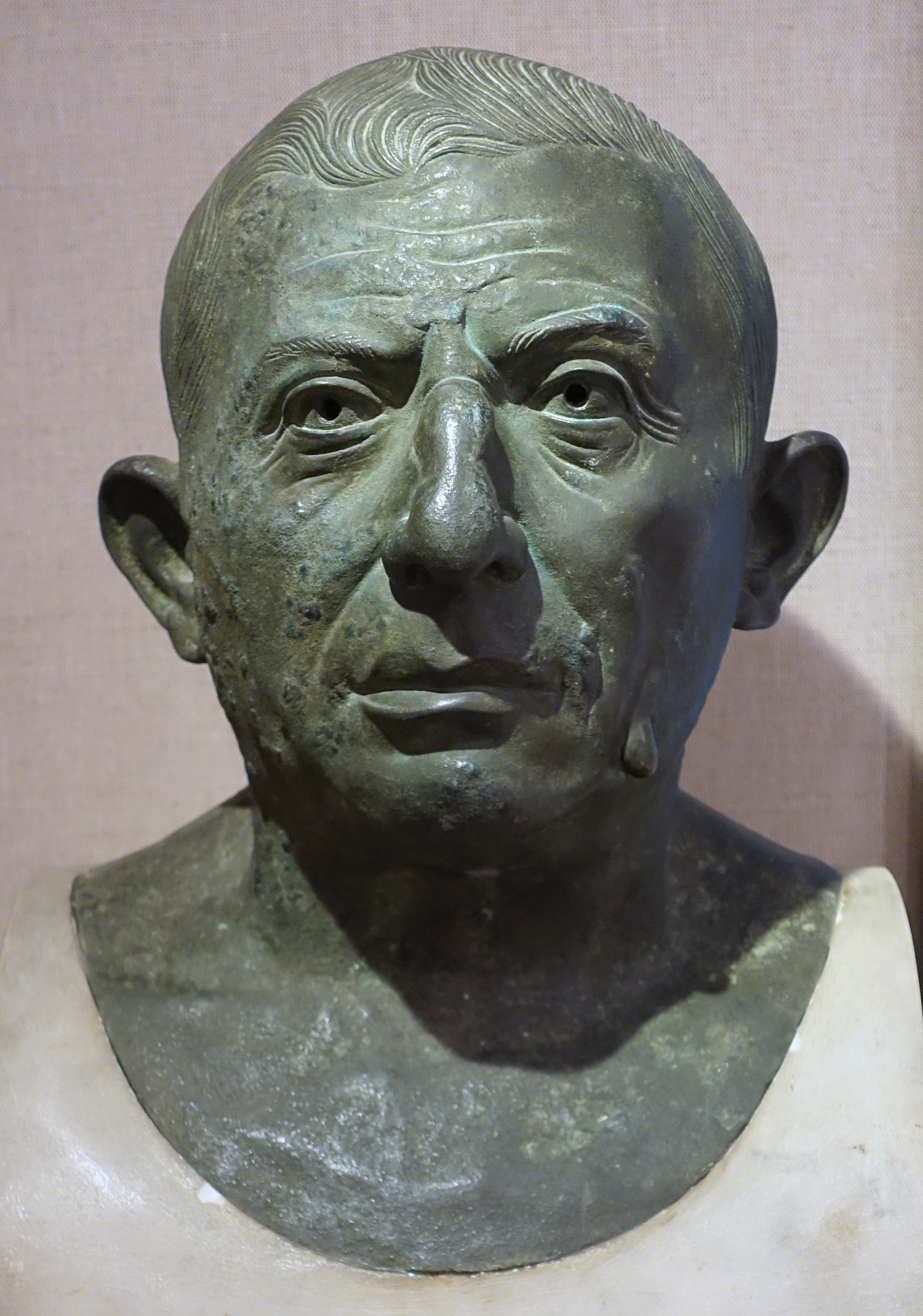
Lucius Caecilius Jucundus, a Pompeian banker.

The gens Caecilia was a plebeian (Note: The appearance of Titus Caecilius, a patrician consular tribune for the year 444 BC in Livy, is a false reading for Titus Cloelius.) family at ancient Rome. Members of this gens are mentioned in history as early as the fifth century BC, but the first of the Caecilii who obtained the consulship was Lucius Caecilius Metellus Denter, in 284 BC. The Caecilii Metelli were one of the most powerful families of the late Republic, from the decades before the First Punic War down to the time of Augustus.

== Origin ==
Like other Roman families in the later times of the Republic, the Caecilii traced their origin to a mythical personage, Caeculus, the founder of Praeneste. He was said to be the son of Vulcan, and engendered by a spark; a similar story was told of Servius Tullius. He was exposed as an infant, but preserved by his divine father, and raised by maidens. He grew up amongst the shepherds, and became a highwayman. Coming of age, he called upon the people of the countryside to build a new town, convincing them with the aid of a miracle. An alternative tradition claimed that the Caecilii were descended from Caecas, one of the companions of Aeneas, who came with him to Italy after the sack of Troy.

== Praenomina ==
The praenomina used by the Caecilii during the Republic are Lucius, Quintus, Gaius, and Marcus. Titus appears only towards the very end of the Republic, and is not known to have been used by the great house of the Caecilii Metelli.

== Branches and cognomina ==
The cognomina of this gens under the Republic are Bassus, Denter, Cornutus, Metellus, Niger, and Rufus, of which the Metelli are the best known. From the consulship of Lucius Caecilius Metellus Denter, the family of the Metelli became one of the most distinguished at Rome. In the latter half of the second century BC, it obtained an extraordinary number of the highest offices of the state. Quintus Metellus, who was consul in 143 BC, had four sons, who were raised to the consulship in succession; and his brother, Lucius Metellus, who was consul in 142, had two sons, who were likewise elevated to the same dignity.

The Metelli were distinguished as a family for their unwavering support of the party of the Optimates. The etymology of their name is quite uncertain. Festus connects it, probably from mere similarity of sound, with mercenarii. The history of the family is very difficult to trace, and in many parts conjectural. It is treated at length by Drumann.

The victory of the consul L. Caecilius Metellus against Hasdrubal's elephants at Panormus in 251 seems to have left a durable impression on the Caecili Metelli, as many of them featured an elephant on the coins they minted. In fact, elephants are so often used on their coins that it might have become their emblem.

== Members ==
This list includes abbreviated praenomina. For an explanation of this practice, see filiation.

=== Caecilii Metelli ===
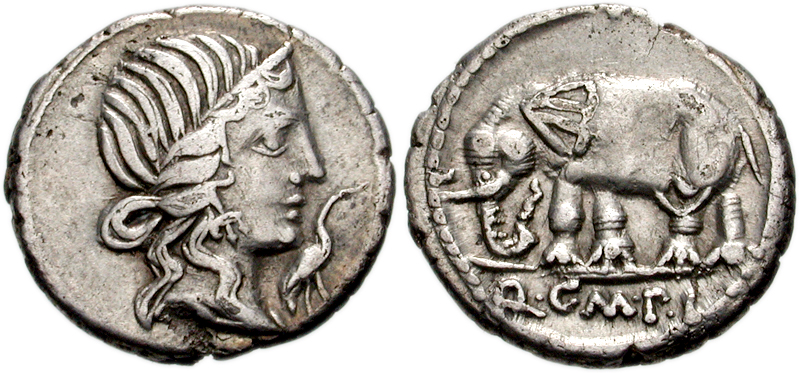
Denarius of Quintus Caecilius Metellus Pius, 81 BC. The obverse depicts a head of Pietas, alluding to the agnomen, Pius. The elephant on the reverse commemorates the capture of Carthaginian elephants by Lucius Caecilius Metellus at Panormus in 251 BC.

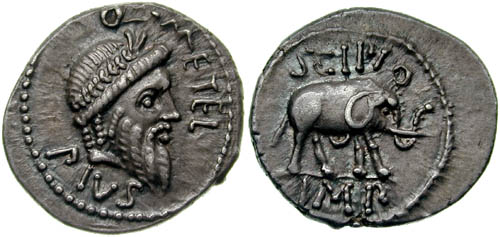
Denarius of Quintus Caecilius Metellus Pius Scipio, c. 46 BC. The obverse depicts the head of Jupiter. The elephant on the reverse may also allude to Africa, since the coin was minted there before the Battle of Thapsus.

- Gaius Caecilius (Metellus), grandfather of Lucius Caecilius Metellus, the consul of 251 BC, and perhaps the father of Lucius Caecilius Metellus Denter, consul in 284.
- Lucius Caecilius (C. f.) Metellus Denter, consul in 284 and praetor in 283 BC, slain in battle against the Senones.
- Lucius Caecilius L. f. C. n. Metellus, consul in 251 and 247 BC, during the First Punic War, and afterward Pontifex Maximus.
- Lucius Caecilius L. f. L. n. Metellus, quaestor in 214 BC, was degraded to an aerarius by the censors for proposing to abandon Italy and establish a new colony after the Battle of Cannae. Nevertheless, he was elected tribune of the plebs for 213, and prosecuted the censors.
- Quintus Caecilius L. f. L. n. Metellus, consul in 206 BC, during the Second Punic War.
- Marcus Caecilius L. f. L. n. Metellus, praetor urbanus in 206 BC.
- Quintus Caecilius Q. f. L. n. Metellus, surnamed Macedonicus, triumphed over Andriscus, and became consul in 143 BC, and censor in 131.
- Lucius Caecilius Q. f. L. n. Metellus, surnamed Calvus, consul in 142 BC.
- Quintus Caecilius Q. f. Q. n. Metellus, consul in 123 and censor in 120 BC, conquered the Balearic Islands, receiving the surname Balearicus, and founded several cities there.
- Lucius Caecilius L. f. Q. n. Metellus, surnamed Delmaticus, consul in 119, triumphed over the Dalmati, and later became Pontifex Maximus.
- Lucius Caecilius Q. f. Q. n. Metellus, surnamed Diadematus, consul in 117 BC and censor in 115 BC.
- Marcus Caecilius Q. f. Q. n. Metellus, consul in 115 BC, triumphed over the Sardinians.
- Gaius Caecilius Q. f. Q. n. Metellus, surnamed Caprarius, consul in 113 and censor on 102 BC, triumphed over the Thracians.
- Caecilia Q. f. Q. n. Metella, married Gaius Servilius Vatia.
- Caecilia Q. f. Q. n. Metella, married Publius Cornelius Scipio Nasica Serapio.
- Quintus Caecilius L. f. Q. n. Metellus, surnamed Numidicus, consul in 109 and censor in 102 BC, triumphed over Jugurtha; expelled from the senate and exiled by Lucius Appuleius Saturninus, and not recalled for two years.
- Caecilia L. f. Q. n. Metella, wife of Lucius Licinius Lucullus, and mother of the younger Lucullus, the conqueror of Mithridates; she had a reputation for dissoluteness.
- Quintus Caecilius Q. f. Q. n. Metellus, surnamed Nepos, consul in 98 BC.
- Quintus Caecilius (L.? f.) Q. n. Metellus, surnamed Celer, a mediocre orator, probably tribune of the plebs in 90 BC and perhaps aedile in 88.
- Caecilia Q. f. Q. n. Metella, married Appius Claudius Pulcher, consul in 79 BC.
- Caecilia L. f. L. n. Metella, married first Marcus Aemilius Scaurus, consul in 115 BC, and second Lucius Cornelius Sulla, the dictator.
- Quintus Caecilius Q. f. L. n. Metellus, surnamed Pius, one of Sulla's most successful generals, consul in 80 BC, and later Pontifex Maximus.
- Gaius Caecilius Metellus, a junior senator circa 80 BC.
- Quintus Caecilius Metellus, surnamed Creticus, consul in 69 BC, triumphed over the Cretans.
- Lucius Caecilius Metellus, consul in 68 BC, died at the beginning of his year of office.
- Marcus Caecilius Metellus, praetor in 69 BC.
- Quintus Caecilius Metellus Creticus, perhaps quaestor circa 60 BC, with Gaius Trebonius.
- Quintus Caecilius Q. f. (L.? n.) Metellus Celer, consul in 60 BC.
- Marcus Caecilius (M. f.) Metellus, mentioned by Cicero in 60 BC.
- Caecilia Q. f. Q. n. Metella, daughter of Metellus Celer.
- Quintus Caecilius Q. f. Q. n. Metellus Nepos, consul in 57 BC.
- Quintus Caecilius Q. f. Q. n. Metellus Pius Scipio, the son of Publius Cornelius Scipio Nasica, adopted by Metellus Pius; appointed consul suffectus from the kalends of Sextilis in 52 BC, and a partisan of Pompeius.
- Lucius Caecilius (L. f.) Metellus, tribune of the plebs in 49 BC, opposed Caesar's attempt to take possession of the sacred treasury.
- Quintus Caecilius (Q. f. Q. n.) Metellus Creticus Silanus, consul in AD 7.

=== Caecilii Dentri ===
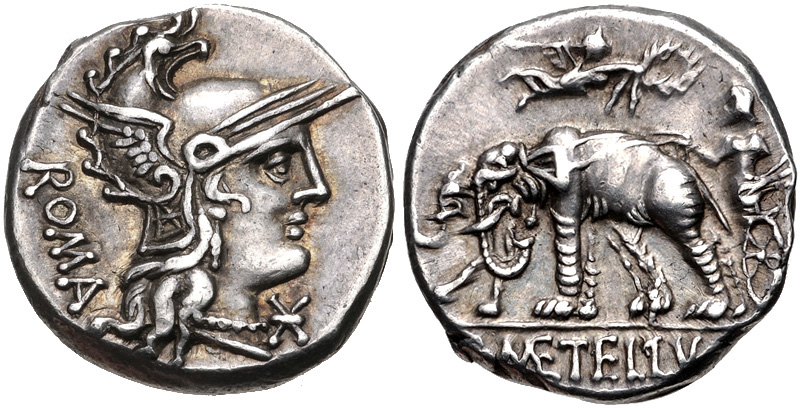
Denarius of Gaius Caecilius Metellus Caprarius, 125 BC. The reverse depicts the triumph of his ancestor Lucius Caecilius Metellus, with the elephants he had captured at the Battle of Panormus.

- Lucius Caecilius Denter, praetor in 182 BC, obtained Sicilia for his province.
- Marcus Caecilius Denter, one of the ambassadors sent to Perseus in 173 BC to inspect the affairs of Macedonia, and to Alexandria to renew the friendship with Ptolemaeus.

=== Caecilii Cornuti ===
- Marcus Caecilius Cornutus, praetor before 90 BC, then legate in 89 and 88 during the Marsic War. He escaped the purges of Marius in 87 through a ruse of his slaves, who passed him off for dead, before spiriting him off to Gaul.
- Gaius Caecilius Cornutus, tribune of the plebs in 61 BC, praetor in 57, and promagistrate the following year in Bithynia and Pontus. He helped Cicero to return from exile during his praetorship, who affectionately called him a "quasi-Cato" for his Optimate ideas. He was probably the historian Cornutus, known from only three fragments, which deal with the Civil War between Caesar and Pompey.
- Marcus Caecilius Cornutus, urbanus in 43 BC, committed suicide when Octavian seized Rome after the Battle of Mutina.
- Marcus Caecilius M. f. Cornutus, a member of the College of Arvales in 21–20 BC, but perhaps as early as 29, when Augustus re-established the college.
- Marcus Caecilius M. f. M. n. Cornutus, succeeded his father as Arval. He was of praetorian rank in the reign of Tiberius but, unjustly accused in connection with a plot against the Emperor, put an end to his own life in AD 24.

=== Others ===
- Gaia Caecilia, the legendary personification of Roman domesticity, frequently equated with Tanaquil, the wife of Tarquinius Priscus, the fifth King of Rome.
- Quintus Caecilius, tribune of the plebs in 439 BC.
- Statius Caecilius, a comic poet of the early 2nd century BC.
- Quintus Caecilius Niger, a Sicilian, and quaestor of Verres during his administration of Sicily. He contended with Cicero for the prosecution of Verres, pretending to be the enemy of his former master, but in reality desiring to deprive the Sicilians of Cicero's advocacy. Cicero's oration Divinatio in Caecilium was delivered against this Caecilius when the judices had to decide which should be given the prosecution.
- Lucius Caecilius Rufus, half-brother of Publius Cornelius Sulla, was tribune of the plebs in 63 BC, and proposed that both Sulla and Publius Autronius Paetus, who had been elected consuls for 66, but been convicted of bribery and condemned, should again be allowed to stand for office; however, Sulla convinced him to withdraw the proposal. Rufus was a supporter of Cicero and the aristocratic party, and opposed agrarian reform. He was praetor in 57, and proposed the recall of Cicero from banishment, incurring the wrath of Publius Clodius Pulcher.
- Quintus Caecilius, an eques, slain by his brother-in-law, Catiline, in the time of Sulla.
- Quintus Caecilius, an eques, who became wealthy as a moneylender, died in 57 BC, leaving his fortune to his nephew, Titus Pomponius Atticus.
- Quintus Caecilius Bassus, an eques, and partisan of Pompeius, was praetor in 46 BC.
- Titus Caecilius, primus pilus in the army of Lucius Afranius, killed at the Battle of Ilerda in 49 BC.
- Caecilia, wife of the younger Publius Cornelius Lentulus Spinther, who divorced her in 45 BC.
- (Caecilius) Bucilianus, a friend of Brutus and Cassius, was, together with his brother, Caecilius, recruited to the conspiracy against Caesar. On the fateful day, Bucilianus wounded Caesar in the back. He was probably a Bucilius adopted by a Caecilius.
- Caecilius, one of the conspirators against Caesar, along with his brother, Bucilianus.
- Caecilia, the daughter of Titus Pomponius Atticus, married Marcus Vipsanius Agrippa.
- Quintus Caecilius Epirota, a grammarian, and freedman of Titus Pomponius Atticus.
- Titus Caecilius Eutychides, a freedman of Titus Pomponius Atticus, afterwards adopted by Quintus Caecilius.
- Caecilius Calactinus, a Jewish Greek rhetorician at Rome in the time of Augustus.
- Caecilius Bion, a writer on the properties of medicinal plants, used by Pliny the Elder.
- Lucius Caecilius Jucundus, a banker at Pompeii during the first century AD, selected as the fictionalized subject of the Cambridge Latin Course.
- Quintus Caecilius L. f. Jucundus, elder son of the Pompeiian banker.
- Sextus Caecilius L. f. Jucundus Metellus, younger son of the Pompeiian banker.
- Caecilius of Elvira, or Saint Caecilius, traditional founder of the Archdiocese of Granada circa AD 64.
- Gnaeus Caecilius Simplex, appointed consul suffectus Ex Kal. Nov. by the emperor Vitellius in AD 69.
- Caecilius Rufinus, expelled from the senate by Domitian because he danced.
- Caecilius Clemens, a notary in Egypt mentioned between AD 86 and 100 in four papyri, notably Papyrus Oxyrhynchus 241 and 581.
- Caecilius Classicus, proconsul of Hispania Baetica from AD 97 to 98, was prosecuted for corruption, but died before he could be tried.
- Aulus Caecilius Faustinus, consul suffectus in AD 99.
- Gaius Caecilius, grandfather of the writer and statesman "Pliny the Younger".
- Lucius Caecilius Cilo, father of the writer and statesman "Pliny the Younger".
- Gaius Plinius Caecilius Secundus, or "Pliny the Younger", a writer and statesman during the late first and early second century. He was a member of gens Caecilia from birth, but was adopted by his maternal uncle, the scholar Gaius Plinius Secundus, or "Pliny the Elder", and changed his name accordingly.
- Quintus Caecilius Redditus, an eques, was governor of Mauretania Tingitana from AD 120 to 122, and later of Noricum.
- Quintus Caecilius Marcellus Dentilianus, consul suffectus around AD 150.
- Caecilius Juventianus, governor of Noricum during the reign of Antoninus Pius.
- Gaius Caecilius Salvianus, vice prefect of Roman Egypt, who became governor in 176 following the execution of the rebel Gaius Calvisius Statianus.
- Sextus Caecilius, a jurist, who may or may not be identical with Sextus Caecilius Africanus.
- Sextus Caecilius Africanus, a jurist during the latter half of the second century
- Caecilius, a writer of Argos on the art of fishing.
- Caecilia, or Saint Cecilia, a semi-legendary matron of Rome, and Christian martyr under Alexander Severus, circa AD 230. Modern historians suspect that she was executed during the reign of Marcus Aurelius.
- Caecilia Paulina, Roman empress during the Crisis of the Third Century. She was the wife of Maximinus Thrax, and mother of Gaius Julius Verus Maximus. She probably died in 236, as Maximinus had her deified that year. Almost nothing is known about her, as most of the works dealing with the reign of Maximinus have been lost.
- Caecilius Natalis, the person who maintains the cause of paganism in the dialogue of Marcus Minucius Felix, entitled Octavius.
- Thascius Caecilius Cyprianus, a Christian philosopher, who became Bishop of Carthage, was martyred, and sanctified as Saint Cyprian.
- Lucius Caecilius Firmianus Lactantius, a Christian author and advisor to Emperor Constantine the Great.

== See also ==
- List of Roman gentes
- Cecilia
- Cecilia (disambiguation)

== Bibliography ==
- Polybius, Historiae (The Histories).
- Marcus Tullius Cicero, Divinatio in Quintum Caecilium, Epistulae ad Atticum, Epistulae ad Familiares, Epistulae ad Quintum Fratrem, Post Reditum in Senatu, Pro Milone, Pro Sulla.
- Quintus Tullius Cicero, De Petitione Consulatus (attributed).
- Gaius Julius Caesar, Commentarii de Bello Civili (Commentaries on the Civil War).
- Cornelius Nepos, De Viris Illustribus (On the Lives of Famous Men).
- Titus Livius (Livy), History of Rome.
- Valerius Maximus, Factorum ac Dictorum Memorabilium (Memorable Facts and Sayings).
- Marcus Annaeus Lucanus (Lucan), Pharsalia.
- Quintus Asconius Pedianus, Commentarius in Oratio Ciceronis In Toga Candida (Commentary on Cicero's Oration In Toga Candida), Commentarius in Oratio Ciceronis Pro Milone (Commentary on Cicero's Oration Pro Milone).
- Gaius Plinius Secundus (Pliny the Elder), Historia Naturalis (Natural History).
- Gaius Plinius Caecilius Secundus (Pliny the Younger), Epistulae (Letters).
- Publius Cornelius Tacitus, Annales, Historiae.
- Plutarchus, Lives of the Noble Greeks and Romans.
- Gaius Suetonius Tranquillus, De Vita Caesarum (Lives of the Caesars, or The Twelve Caesars).
- Appianus Alexandrinus (Appian), Bellum Civile (The Civil War).
- Sextus Pompeius Festus, Epitome de M. Verrio Flacco de Verborum Significatu (Epitome of Marcus Verrius Flaccus' On the Meaning of Words).
- Athenaeus, Deipnosophistae (The Banquet of the Learned).
- Lucius Cassius Dio Cocceianus (Cassius Dio), Roman History.
- Gaius Julius Solinus, De Mirabilis Mundi (On the Wonders of the World).
- Marcus Minucius Felix, Octavius.
- Maurus Servius Honoratus (Servius), Ad Virgilii Aeneidem Commentarii (Commentary on Vergil's Aeneid).
- Johann Adam Hartung, Die Religion der Römer (The Religion of the Romans), Palm und Enke, Erlangen (1836).
- Johann Christian Felix Bähr, Die Christlich-Römische Theologie, Christian Friedrich Müller, Karlsruhe (1837).
- Rudolf Heinrich Klausen, Aeneas und die Penaten, Friedrich and Andreas Perthes, Hamburg and Gotha (1839).
- Wilhelm Drumann, Geschichte Roms in seinem Übergang von der republikanischen zur monarchischen Verfassung, oder: Pompeius, Caesar, Cicero und ihre Zeitgenossen, Königsberg (1834–1844).
- Dictionary of Greek and Roman Biography and Mythology, William Smith, ed., Little, Brown and Company, Boston (1849).
- Broughton, T. Robert S. (1952–1986). The Magistrates of the Roman Republic. American Philological Association.
- Michael Crawford, Roman Republican Coinage, Cambridge University Press (1974, 2001).
- Géza Alföldy, Konsulat und Senatorenstand unter der Antonien (The Consulate and Senatorial State under the Antonines), Rudolf Habelt, Bonn (1977).
- Robin Waterfield, Plutarch: Roman Lives, Oxford University Press (1999).
- Jörg Rüpke, Anne Glock, David Richardson (translator), Fasti Sacerdotum: A Prosopography of Pagan, Jewish, and Christian Religious Officials in the City of Rome, 300 BC to AD 499, Oxford University Press, 2008.
- Tim Cornell (editor), The Fragments of the Roman Historians, Oxford University Press, 2013.
- Shackleton Bailey, David Roy (1976). Two Studies in Roman Nomenclature. American Philological Association. ISBN 978-0-89192-180-6.
- August Pauly; Georg Wissowa; Wilhelm Kroll; Kurt Witte; Karl Mittelhaus; Konrat Ziegler, eds. (1894–1980). Paulys Realencyclopädie der classischen Altertumswissenschaft. Stuttgart: J. B. Metzler.
