= Marcus Aemilius Scaurus (consul 115 BC) =

Roman princeps senatus and consul in 115 BC

- Born: c. 159 BC
- Died: mid-November 89 – February 88 BC
- Office: Consul (115 BC); Censor (109 BC; abdicated); princeps senatus
- Opponents: L Appuleius Saturninus; Q Servilius Caepio
- Spouse: Caecilia Metella
- Children: 2

Marcus Aemilius Scaurus (c. 159 – c. 89 BC) was a Roman statesman who served as consul in 115 BC. He was also a long-standing princeps senatus, occupying the post from 115 until his death in late 89 or early 88 BC, and as such was widely considered one of the most prestigious and influential politicians of the late Republic.

After his consulship, Scaurus wrote De vita sua, which was probably the first autobiography in Roman history.

== Family background ==
Scaurus was born probably in 161 BC into the famous gens Aemilia, one of the most successful patrician gentes of the Republic. However, despite their patrician status, the Aemilii Scauri did not have the prominence of the other branches of the gens. No ancestor of Scaurus is known to have held a magistracy, albeit he might have descended from the Aemilii Barbulae, who counted several consuls between 317 and 230. Scaurus' father, also named Marcus, was even said to have been a charcoal merchant. Scaurus wrote in his autobiography that he only inherited from his father estates worth 35,000 sesterces and six slaves, and that he was not sure whether he should go in banking or politics. Cicero commented that Scaurus was so poor "he had to work his way up like a novus homo".

== Career ==
=== Early career ===
Little is known of Scaurus' early career. Scaurus served as a common soldier in Spain, where the Republic waged several long and uncertain wars. Ronald Syme suggested he could have been one of the many ambitious young men who enlisted in the army that Scipio Aemilianus successfully commanded against Numantia, such as Gaius Marius, Publius Rutilius Rufus, and Gaius Memmius—all later opponents of Scaurus. Perhaps his distinguished service in Spain convinced Scaurus to engage in politics.

Scaurus is found again serving in Sardinia in the staff of Lucius Aurelius Orestes, consul and proconsul in Sardinia between 126 and 124. It is probably at this time that he became an enemy of Gaius Gracchus, who was Orestes' quaestor throughout the campaign. Scaurus may have been among those in Orestes' staff who were offended by Gracchus' successes in obtaining supplies from the Sardinian natives, as well as grain from the Numidian king Micipsa. In 124, Scaurus possibly denounced Gracchus before the censors for having left his post early in order to run for the tribunician elections for 123.

In 123 BC, he was co-opted into the college of augurs. He next served as curule aedile in charge of the public games in 122 BC, and afterwards was elected praetor either in 120 or 119 BC (though Bates prefers 119 BC, as does Broughton in Magistrates of the Roman Republic). In 119, Scaurus opposed Gaius Marius's proposed voting reform law, which would have made it more difficult for patrons to influence voting in the comitia. He also opposed in that year Jugurtha's claim to the Numidian throne.

=== Consulship ===
Scaurus stood for election to the consulship in 116 BC but was defeated by Quintus Fabius Maximus Eburnus; he was successful the next year, buoyed with aristocratic support as a political conservative, becoming consul for 115 BC with Marcus Caecilius Metellus. One of his opponents, Publius Rutilius Rufus, prosecuted Scaurus for ambitus (electoral corruption); Scaurus responded by countersuing Rufus for the same charge. Both were acquitted. (Note: Bates relates a passage in the trial where both sides quarrelled over the meaning of the letters AFPR in Rufus' account book. Scaurus claimed it meant actum fide Publii Rutilii, Rufus claimed it meant ante factum post relatum (a correction), and a supporter of Rufus joked it meant Aemilius fecit, plectitur Rutilius (i.e. Aemilius [Scaurus] did it but Rutilius is blamed).) He passed a sumptuary law attempting to eliminate certain aristocratic dishes and spending on banquets; he also passed a law on voting for freedmen, of which little is known. He also conducted a successful campaign against tribes in Gaul and Liguria; for this he was voted a triumph. "The most outstanding event of Scaurus' consulship was his public humiliation of the praetor P Decius Subulo" in which Scaurus ripped Decius' vestments, smashed his curule chair, and forbade cases from being brought to before him, apparently because Decius refused to stand up in the presence of the consul. This was likely a political move: Decius had previously prosecuted Scaurus' ally Opimius.

In the same year, Scaurus was nominated, either by Lucius Caecilius Metellus Diadematus or Lucius Caecilius Metellus Delmaticus, and confirmed as princeps senatus by the senate, an office which he held until his death. This was the foremost honour during this period, and usually went to the most senior patrician. For the relatively young Scaurus to receive it was therefore considered a coup. Around this time, Scaurus married Metella, Metellus Delmaticus' daughter.

After his consulship, Scaurus may have been on the jury as one of the pontifices during the 114 BC trial of the Vestal Virgins. He also was accused by one Marcus Brutus of extortion, but was acquitted and "came through with his auctoritas intact".

=== Jugurthine War ===
Before the Jugurthine War (112–106 BC), he was sent as envoy to Numidia with a demand for Jugurtha to cease hostilities against the Numidian king Adherbal. The evidence supports that Scaurus was "not well disposed towards Jugurtha or his intrigues". When Jugurtha refused the demands, war was declared and the consul Lucius Calpurnius Bestia was sent to Africa.

Scaurus served as one of Bestia's legati during the first year of the war (112 BC). According to the historian Sallust – whose account is very hostile towards Scaurus – both Bestia and Scaurus accepted bribes from Jugurtha to end the war early. Bates argues that Bestia and Scaurus more likely granted Jugurtha a truce in exchange for reparations and a diplomatic settlement, a choice reflecting Roman military weakness after the defeat in the Battle of Noreia in 113 BC.

When the settlement became known in Rome, the tribune Gaius Mamilius Limetanus embarked on "a general assault upon the nobility" in 109 BC. Mamilius passed a law creating a special court, the Mamilian commission, to look into charges of bribery. According to Sallust, Scaurus not only avoided prosecution but even managed to get himself elected as one of the three judges (quaesitores) for the trial. Some scholars believe that Sallust confused Scaurus with the similarly named Marcus Aurelius Scaurus. However, Bates argues "we need not question Scaurus' appointment" and that our Scaurus may have instead been elected due to his previously voiced opposition to Jugurtha.

=== Censorship and 'father of the senate' ===
In 109 BC, Scaurus was elected censor with Marcus Livius Drusus the Elder as his colleague. However, when Drusus suddenly died during their year of office, Scaurus was forced against his will to abdicate his censorship, only relenting from the position when tribunes ordered him to be dragged off to prison.

In 104 BC, Scaurus became responsible for Rome's grain supply, the cura annonae; his appointment was at the expense of Lucius Appuleius Saturninus, at the time a quaestor. Cicero judges that the loss of the cura annonae was the spark that drove Saturninus towards the populares, but it may also have been an attack, possibly to steal credit, "on an already proclaimed popularis rather than a first step in inducing [Saturninus'] political conversion". Scaurus' political views – especially on the four major issues of the day: (1) land reform, (2) court reform, (3) citizenship for the Italians, and (4) questions of maiestas – are not well-known; most scholars place him among the conservatives with little further comment. It is possible that Scaurus supported land reform, or at least the Gracchan proposals to enforce limits on use of the ager publicus (public land), but opposed popularis methods rather than policy themes. His views on maiestas are more clear, supporting proposals like the Mamilian commission to prosecute treasonous behaviour, but also opposing indiscriminate prosecutions. Bates speculates that Scaurus contributed to the harshness (Note: Scaurus was known for his relatively harshness and rigid commitment to traditional moral values: after learning of his son fleeing from battle in the Cimbric war, he banished him from his house, leading to his son's suicide.) of the Mamilian commission's sentences, but admits there is no direct evidence thereof.

In 104 BC, after Gnaeus Domitius Ahenobarbus – one of the tribunes of the plebs – was not co-opted into the college of augurs, he sued Scaurus. However, "[Ahenobarbus'] sense of honour made him unwilling to use the evidence that one of Scaurus' own slaves offered to provide" and the trial resulted in acquittal. In response, Domitius passed a bill which gave the power to appoint priests to the tribal assembly.

The next year, 103, started showing in public the corruption and short-sightedness of the senatorial elite, started with the re-election of Gaius Marius to his third consulships, in a period with "the poorest showing yet of senatorial military prowess". Scaurus led the opposition against the popularis tribune Gaius Norbanus's targeting of Quintus Servilius Caepio (consul 106 BC) after the Caepio's refusal as proconsul to cooperate with then-consul Gnaeus Mallius Maximus, leading to the catastrophic defeat at Battle of Arausio in 105 BC. After passing a law with the effect of expelling Caepio from the senate, (Note: The law technically expelled persons who had their imperium abrogated by the people from the senate, which happened to include Caepio.) Norbanus successfully prosecuted Caepio before the popular assembly for the theft of the Gold of Tolosa, which had mysteriously disappeared as it was being shipped to Rome. Given that Caepio's defence was a flimsy assertion of bad luck, the outcome of the trial was not greatly in doubt. Alongside the tribune Titus Didius and Lucius Aurelius Cotta, Scaurus attempted veto the proceedings, but was driven back through violence: Scaurus was even struck in the head by a stone. Scaurus' reasons for opposing Caepio's prosecution likely did not have to do with the principle of prosecuting aristocrats – Scaurus was involved in the Mamilian commission which had previously done that – but rather with the use of the popular assemblies to disrupt the auctoritas of the senate. Norbanus was eventually tried around 95 BC for this act of violence.

Scaurus was involved in an unsuccessful prosecution of Gaius Memmius and Gaius Flavius Fimbria. He also encouraged ambassadors from Mithradates to sue Saturninus on the capital charge of violating their diplomatic inviolability. Both prosecutions were unsuccessful. In 102, Scaurus was reappointed princeps senatus, perhaps as a gesture in support of his hard line against Saturninus, or possibly as a matter of course (there are no records of a princeps senatus not being reappointed during his lifetime).

In 100 BC, during the height of the violence brought about by Saturninus and Gaius Servilius Glaucia, Scaurus moved the so-called senatus consultum ultimum that would lead to both the deaths of Saturninus and Glaucia. While "it is possible... to over-emphasise this fact... it probably devolved upon the princeps senatus to initiate action in matters of such import", Scaurus also did seem to have "nurtured an especially vigorous personal antipathy towards Saturninus".

=== 90s BC ===
Scaurus may have participated in a mission to the east (legatio Asiatica), which took place some time between 96 and 98 BC. (Note: Bates says that Badian dates to 97 or 96 BC while B A Marshall dates it to 98 or 97 BC.) It is, however, not clear whether he engaged in travel or just supported the mission. The mission likely included Gaius Marius – travelling on the pretext of fulfilling a vow to magna mater – but more likely to investigate Mithridates VI's campaigns in Cappadocia without arousing suspicion. Following the mission, the senate dispatched Quintus Mucius Scaevola Pontifex and Publius Rutilius Rufus to Asia in a successful administration of the province. A few years later in 92 BC, Lucius Cornelius Sulla also was dispatched east as propraetor in Cilicia, where he contested Mithridates' advances into Cappadocia.

Scaurus supported the prosecution of Norbanus for his use of violence in the trial of Caepio, testifying as a major witness for the prosecution. He also supported the lex Licinia Mucia, a law to investigate Italians usurping the privileges of Roman citizens, likely in a move to buttress the senate's position in the state.

In 92 BC, Scaurus was probably involved in the defence of Publius Rutilius Rufus, whose honest governance during his time as a legate in Asia province had aroused the enmity of the equites. He was convicted even though his innocence was widely known. Following the Rufus trial, Scaurus was himself prosecuted by Quintus Servilius Caepio the Younger for repetundis (extortion), specifically, for receiving money which had been extorted by someone else. Scaurus was somehow successful in bringing the younger Caepio to trial first in a countersuit; both men were acquitted.

This affair drove Scaurus to support the legal reforms of Marcus Livius Drusus – elected tribune of the plebs in 91 BC – to enlarge the senate by adding around 300 equites and transfer the court jury pools back from the equites into the senate. Scaurus was one of Drusus' main advisors. Alongside Lucius Licinius Crassus, Scaurus was Drusus' main conservative champion and helped pass his extensive legislative programme. However, after the sudden death of Crassus in September 91 BC, Drusus rapidly lost his support in the senate, and the consul Lucius Marcius Philippus succeeded in abrogating Drusus' laws on religious technicalities.

It is possible that Scaurus supported Drusus' proposals to enfranchise the Italians and was sympathetic to the socii. Historians disagree as to Scaurus' positions on the socii: Bates 1986, p. 275 argues that he supported Drusus' Italian bill, while Gruen 1965, p. 61 argues that Scaurus supported Drusus' programme with the exception of Italian citizenship and that he would not have so easily swapped from his earlier opposition to Italian citizenship in the past. After Drusus' assassination and the outbreak of the Social war, Scaurus was prosecuted in 90 BC by tribune Quintus Varius Severus. Varius summoned Scaurus to a trial before the people. Scaurus, who at this point was aged, gout-ridden, and infirm, retorted to the accusator:

[Quintus] Varius the Spaniard says that Marcus Scaurus, the princeps senatus, has summoned the allies to arms. Marcus Scaurus, the princeps senatus denies the charge, and there is no witness. Which of us, Quirites [citizens], is it meet to believe? (Note: Also recorded as "Citizens, it is unfair that I have lived my life among one set of people but should have to defend it before [another]; but I shall be so bold as to ask you a question, since most of you were not there to witness my actions when I was carrying out my public offices: Varius Serverus from the Sucro claims that Aemilius Scaurus was bribed by a king and betrayed the empire of the Roman people; Aemilius Scaurus claims that he had nothing to do with such an offence. Which of the two do you believe?" Val. Max., 3.7.8.)

The charges were promptly dismissed in the clamour of the people. Varius probably brought the charges against Scaurus as part of "an attack on the most distinguished member of the Metellan faction... a conviction would have been a crippling blow to the Metellan bloc".

The younger Caepio also charged Scaurus before the court. It is unknown whether the charges were dropped, dismissed, or simply lapsed. (Note: If Scaurus died between mid-November 89 and February 88, as claimed by Tansey, then there would have been enough time for trial. The charges, therefore, must have been dropped or dismissed.) Caepio was killed in action early in 90 BC and Scaurus was dead by 88 BC, when his wife Caecilia Metella married Sulla. A precise date of death is unknown, but because Scaurus was reappointed princeps senatus in 89 BC and his priesthood was succeeded in 88 BC, it can be narrowed to relative precision to between mid-November 89 BC and February 88 BC.

== Legacy ==
Scaurus' prestige outlived his death, and he was remembered by subsequent generations of Romans as a figure of great importance. Cicero in particular was a keen admirer, and once commented that "almost the whole world was ruled by his nod" (cuius nutu prope terrarum orbis regebatur). Ancient historian Valerius Maximus included Scaurus in his list of severe fathers, noting specifically Scaurus' reaction to his son's flight from battle against the Cimbri, where his disapproval of his son's actions led the son to commit suicide.

However, judgements on Scaurus were not always positive. Most notably, the historian Sallust portrays Scaurus in the Bellum Jugurthinum as an unscrupulous and greedy politician. Sallust claims that Scaurus accepted bribes from the Numidian king Jugurtha, and calls him "a noble full of energy, a partisan, greedy for power, fame, and riches, but clever in concealing his faults" (homo nobilis impiger factiosus, avidus potentiae honoris divitiarum, ceterum vitia sua callide occultans).

Scaurus was the last person who claimed the office of princeps senatus as the primary source of his prestige. After his death, the turmoil of the civil wars of Cinna and Sulla would submerge the prestige and authority of the office beneath the power of the army.

== Personal life ==
With his first wife, whose name is unknown, Scaurus had one son; the only details preserved about the son are that he held the rank of legate and killed himself after being defeated in battle. Scaurus' second wife was Caecilia Metella, daughter of Lucius Caecilius Metellus Delmaticus, who was later the fourth wife of Lucius Cornelius Sulla. From this marriage, Scaurus had two children:

- Aemilia, the second wife of Pompey, and
- Marcus Aemilius Scaurus, a praetor in 56 BC.

== Footnotes ==
Preceded by Gaius Licinius Geta; Q. Fabius Maximus Eburnus	Roman consul 115 BC; With: Marcus Caecilius Metellus	Succeeded by Manius Acilius Balbus; Gaius Porcius Cato
