= Quintus Mucius Scaevola Augur =

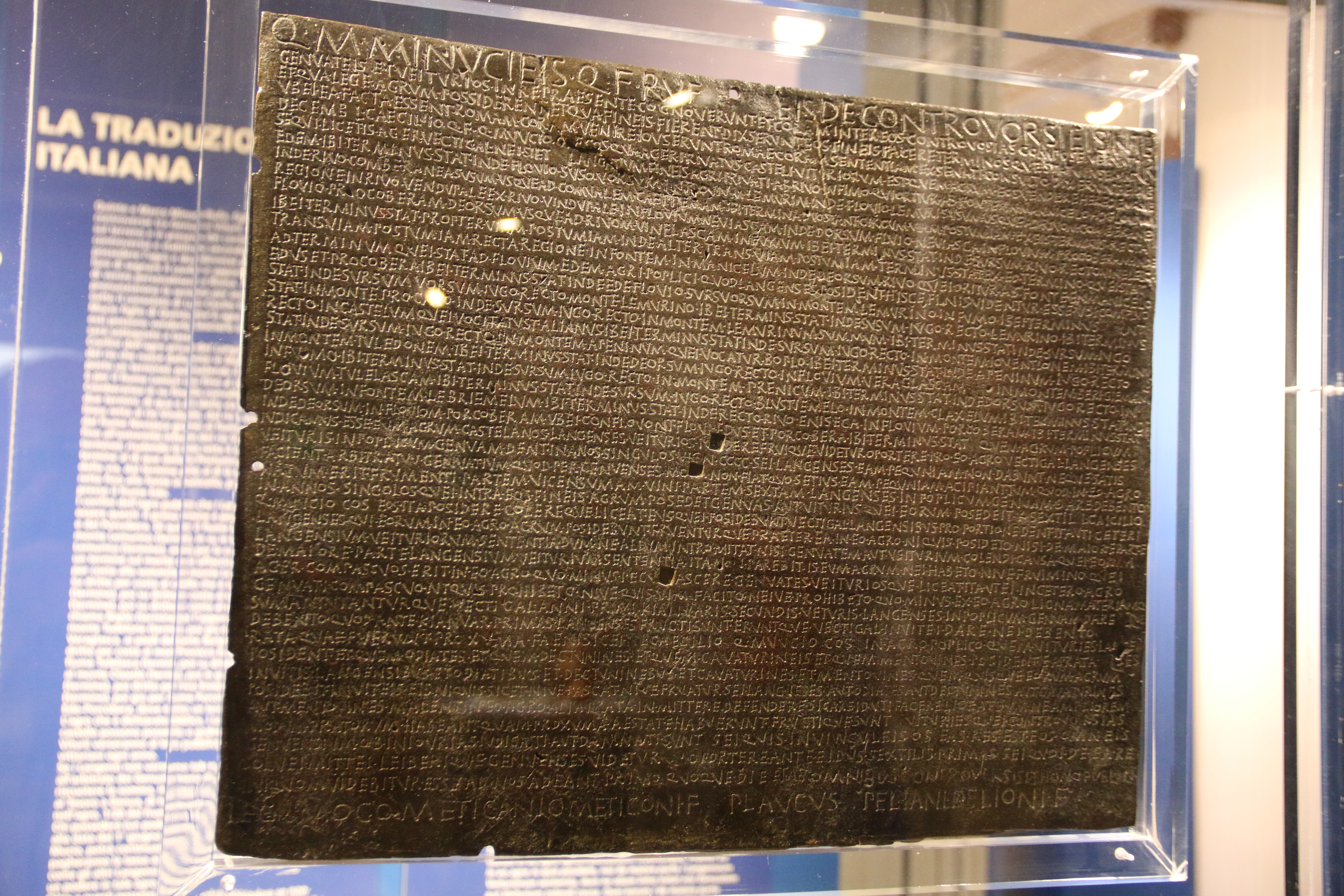
- Sententia Minuciorum CIL I, 584, dated 117 BC

Roman consul

Quintus Mucius Scaevola Augur (c. 169 – 88 BC) was a politician of the Roman Republic, Stoic, and an early authority on Roman law. He was first educated in law by his father (whose name he shared) and in philosophy by the Stoic Panaetius of Rhodes. Both Augur and his relative Quintus Mucius Scaevola Pontifex, father-in-law of Pompey, were prominent Optimates.

Scaevola was made tribune in 128 BC, aedile in 125, and praetor in 121, in which capacity he acted as governor of Asia. Upon his return to Rome the following year he faced a charge of extortion brought by Titus Albucius (probably on personal grounds) which he successfully defended. In 117, he was elected consul.

In his old age, Scaevola vigorously maintained his interest in the law and in the affairs of Rome. He also passed on his knowledge of law to some of Rome's most celebrated orators, as the teacher of Cicero and Atticus. In 88 BC, he alone defended Gaius Marius against Sulla's motion to have him named an enemy of the people, saying that he would never agree to have this done to a man who had saved Rome. He was considered an eminent jurist and renowned for his knowledge of civil law in particular.

Cicero used the persona of his old master as an interlocutor in three works, his De Oratore, De amicitia, and De republica. This usage places Scaevola as a member of the Scipionic Circle.

He is attested as consul, together with his colleague, Lucius Caecilius Metellus Diadematus, on the sententia Minuciorum, a legal document describing arbitration by Roman officials.

== Family ==
Scaevola married Laelia, a daughter of Gaius Laelius, a close friend of Scipio Aemilianus, and had a son and two daughters. His wife, daughter, and granddaughters were all famed for the purity of their Latin.

Scaevola's daughter married Lucius Licinius Crassus, consul in 95 BC and the greatest orator of his day.

His first cousins included the consuls and Pontifices maximi Publius Licinius Crassus Dives Mucianus and Publius Mucius Scaevola. The former was father of Licinia, wife of the ill-fated tribune Gaius Gracchus.

Political offices
Preceded by Marcus Porcius Cato; Quintus Marcius Rex	Roman consul 117 BC with Lucius Caecilius Metellus Diadematus	Succeeded by Gaius Licinius Geta; Quintus Fabius Maximus Eburnus
