= Robert Knapp =

Robert Knapp may refer to:

- Robert D. Knapp (1897–1994), U.S. Air Force aviator and general
- Robert M. Knapp (1831–1889), congressman from Illinois
- Robert Knapp (actor) (1924–2001), American actor
- Robert Knapp (classicist) (1946–2023), professor of classics at the University of California, Berkeley
