= Gaius Caecilius Metellus Caprarius =

Roman politician and general, consul in 113 BC

Gaius Caecilius Metellus Caprarius (born c. 160 BC) was a consul of the Roman Republic in 113 BC with Gnaeus Papirius Carbo. He served under Scipio Aemilianus in Numantia around 133 BC. He was praetor in 117 BC. His proconsulship in Thrace in 112–111 BC earned him a triumph. He was censor in 102 BC with his cousin, Quintus Caecilius Metellus Numidicus.

== Family ==
The Caecilii Metelli were an extremely prominent family in the late Roman Republic. They were conservative aristocrats, though members of the plebeian gens Caecilia.

Caprarius was the youngest son of Quintus Caecilius Metellus Macedonicus. Macedonicus was praetor in 148 BC and consul in 143 BC. He received the command in Macedonia, where he defeated a pretender to the throne named Andriscus. He received a triumph and the cognomen 'Macedonicus' for this victory. He was censor in 131 BC. Macedonicus was a conservative aristocrat and opposed Tiberius Gracchus and Gaius Gracchus, who went around the Senate and based their power on the people.

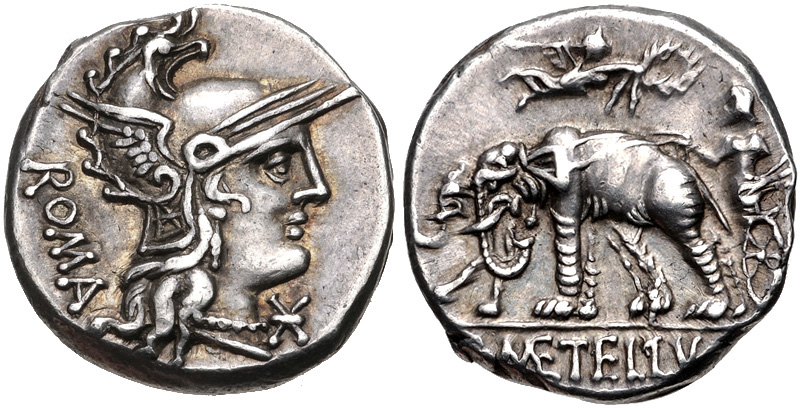
Denarius coined by him in 125 BC.

Caprarius' eldest brother was Quintus Caecilius Metellus Balearicus. He went to Thessaly to obtain grain as aedile around 130 BC. He was praetor by 126 BC and consul in 123 BC. Balearicus was given the command to defeat the inhabitants of the Balearic Islands, who practiced piracy. He was victorious and triumphed in 121 BC, receiving the cognomen 'Balearicus'. He was censor in 120 BC.

Caprarius' second brother was Lucius Caecilius Metellus Diadematus. He was given the cognomen 'Diadematus' because of the bandage he wore on a head wound. He was consul in 117 BC, and promoted infrastructural improvement in Italy. A conservative aristocrat like his father, he probably opposed Gaius Gracchus.

The third brother was Marcus Caecilius Metellus. He was mint master in 127 BC, praetor by 118 BC, and consul in 115 BC. Marcus was given the proconsular command in Corsica and Sardinia from 114 BC to 111 BC, and triumphed for his victory there.

Caprarius had two sisters, both named Caecilia Metella. One married Gaius Servilius Vatia, who was praetor in 114 BC. The other married Publius Cornelius Scipio Nasica Serapio, who was consul in 111 BC.

Caprarius had three sons. One was Quintus Caecilius Metellus Creticus, who was praetor in 74 BC and consul in 69 BC. He was pontifex from 73 BC until his death. Creticus was given the proconsular command against the island of Crete, which was aiding Mithridates and infested with pirates. He defeated the island and triumphed for it in 62 BC, receiving the cognomen 'Creticus'.

Another son was Lucius Caecilius Metellus. He was praetor in 71 BC. He succeeded Gaius Verres as governor of Sicily in 70 BC. He died in office as consul in 68 BC.

Marcus Caecilius Metellus was Caprarius' third son. He was praetor and president of the extortion court in 69 BC.

Caprarius' daughter, Caecilia Metella, was the wife of Gaius Verres. Verres was the governor of Sicily from 73 BC to 71 BC. He was also the defendant on trial in Cicero's speech Against Verres.

== Position as Censor ==
Caprarius was censor in 102 BC with his cousin, Quintus Caecilius Metellus Numidicus. The purpose of the censors was to monitor the roll of the Senate and remove people from it when necessary. The office of censor was not held every year as others, such as the office of consul, were.

Numidicus was the son of Lucius Caecilius Metellus Calvus. Numidicus was possibly mint master in 117 or 116 BC, he was praetor by 112 BC, and he was consul in 109 BC.

Both Caprarius and Numidicus were conservative aristocrats, in keeping with their family history. In their censorship, Numidicus tried unsuccessfully to expel Lucius Appuleius Saturninus and Gaius Servilius Glaucia from the Senate. Saturninus was a popularis, a politician that drew his power from the people. He was of plebeian stock. He was removed from his position as quaestor in 105 or 104 BC for being an opponent of the Senate. He proposed a law to reduce grain prices that received the support of Glaucia.

Glaucia was from a patrician family, but he, like Saturninus, was a popularis. Both had the support of Gaius Marius. Glaucia collaborated with Saturninus against the Senate as tribune in 101 BC and his praetorship in 100 BC. Glaucia and Saturninus conspired to make Glaucia consul and Saturninus tribune in 99 BC. They used violence in an attempt to reach their goal, and Saturninus murdered Glaucia's competitor for the consulship. Glaucia and Saturninus were imprisoned in the Curia by Marius at the Senate's behest. They were both murdered by an angry mob.

To get revenge for the attempted expulsion from the Senate, Saturninus tried to force Numidicus to swear acceptance of a law that gave land to Marius' veterans. Numidicus refused and went into exile. Caprarius fought for Numidicus' return in 99 BC.

== See also ==
- Caecilia gens

== Sources ==
- Broughton, T. Robert. Magistrates of the Roman Republic Vol. 1. New York: American Philological Association. 1951. 535.
- Broughton, T. Robert. Magistrates of the Roman Republic Vol. 2. New York: American Philological Association. 1952. 71, 122, 137.
- Salazar, Christine F. Brill's New Pauly: Encyclopedia of the Ancient World Vol 1. Boston: Brill Leiden. 2003. 903.
- Salazar, Christine F. Brill's New Pauly: Encyclopedia of the Ancient World Vol 2. Boston: Brill Leiden. 2003. 874–879.
- Salazar, Christine F. Brill's New Pauly: Encyclopedia of the Ancient World Vol 13. Boston: Brill Leiden. 2003. 903.

Political offices
Preceded by Manius Acilius Balbus; Gaius Porcius Cato	Roman consul 113 BC; With: Gnaeus Papirius Carbo	Succeeded by Marcus Livius Drusus; L. Calpurnius Piso Caesoninus
