= Lucius Caecilius Metellus Delmaticus =

Roman consul in 119 BCE

Lucius Caecilius Metellus Delmaticus (born c. 160 BC) was a Roman politician and general. He was a son of Lucius Caecilius Metellus Calvus and brother of Quintus Caecilius Metellus Numidicus. He was consul in 119 BC; during his year, he opposed Gaius Marius' election procedures law. As consul and proconsul from 119–117 BC, he campaigned against the Dalmatians. For his victories, he triumphed in 117 BC, earning his cognomen and dedicating two temples – also contributing to repairs for the Temple of Castor and Pollux – from the spoils of war.

He was probably elected censor in 115 BC. Attribution of which Caecilius Metellus was elected censor in that year is disputed: Broughton's Magistrates of the Roman Republic (1951) believes it was Lucius Caecilius Metellus Diadematus; Ernst Badian, however, believes that the engraver made a mistake, and that it is more likely that Delmaticus served as censor in that year.

He was later elected pontifex maximus, in place of Publius Mucius Scaevola, some time before December 114 BC. During his pontifical tenure, he was judge in a trial of three Vestal Virgins for unchastity, of which one was convicted. The acquittal by the pontiffs of two of the vestals was overturned the next year when they were convicted and put to death by a special tribunal convened under Lucius Cassius Longinus Ravilla.

His replacement as pontifex maximus was elected in 103 BC, indicating that Delmaticus likely had died by that time.

== Children ==
He was the father of:

- Lucius Caecilius Metellus
- Marcus Caecilius Metellus
- Caecilia Metella, wife of Marcus Aemilius Scaurus and later Sulla.

== See also ==
- Caecilia gens

Political offices
Preceded by Publius Manilius; Gaius Papirius Carbo	Roman consul 119 BC; With: Lucius Aurelius Cotta	Succeeded by Marcus Porcius Cato; Quintus Marcius Rex
