= Gaius Licinius Geta =

Roman Senator and consul

Gaius Licinius Geta (fl. 2nd century BC) was a Roman Senator who was elected Roman consul in 116 BC.

== Biography ==
Not much is known about the early career of Geta, who was born into the Plebeian gens Licinia. By 119 BC, he had been elected to the rank of Praetor, and this was followed by his election as consul in 116 BC. After his tenure in office, Geta was expelled from the Senate in 115 BC along with 31 other senators by the order of the two Censors Lucius Caecilius Metellus Diadematus and Gnaeus Domitius Ahenobarbus.

At a subsequent census, Geta was reinstated as a senator. He was later himself elected as Censor in 108 BC, alongside his consular colleague Quintus Fabius Maximus Eburnus. During their censorship, they reappointed Marcus Aemilius Scaurus as princeps senatus. He is the only man who, having been expelled by the censors from the senate, was reinstated and later elected censor himself.

== Sources ==
- Broughton, T. Robert S., The Magistrates of the Roman Republic, Vol I (1951)
- Smith, William, Dictionary of Greek and Roman Biography and Mythology, Vol II (1867)

Political offices
Preceded by Lucius Caecilius Metellus Diadematus and Quintus Mucius Scaevola Augur	Consul of the Roman Republic; 116 BC with Quintus Fabius Maximus Eburnus	Succeeded by Marcus Aemilius Scaurus and Marcus Caecilius Metellus
