= Quintus Fabius Maximus Eburnus =

2nd-century BC Roman statesman and consul

Quintus Fabius Maximus Eburnus (fl. 2nd century BC) was a Roman statesman of the patrician gens Fabia. He was consul in 116 BC.

== Family ==
Eburnus was the son of Quintus Fabius Maximus Servilianus, consul in 142 BC, himself adopted from the gens Servilia into the gens Fabia, allegedly by one of the two adoptive sons of Quintus Fabius Maximus Verrucosus himself. Two of his paternal uncles—Gnaeus Servilius Caepio and Quintus Servilius Caepio—served as consuls in 141 and 140, respectively. His first cousin was Quintus Servilius Caepio, consul in 106 BC and the co-commander at Arausio in 105 (this Caepio was paternal grandfather of Caesar's lover Servilia).

== Career ==
Eburnus may have been a monetalis around 134 BC. He was most likely the Quintus Fabius Maximus who was quaestor in 132, serving in Sicily under his father-in-law Publius Rupilius, who was a consul that year. Eburnus was held responsible for losing control of the city of Tauromenium to the slave uprising, and he was sent back to Rome "in disgrace" even though the Roman siege eventually succeeded. A considerable gap in his career followed.

He held the praetorship no later than 119 BC, when he may have been the Fabius Maximus who presided as praetor over the court in which Lucius Licinius Crassus prosecuted Gaius Papirius Carbo. The charge is unclear: extortion, perhaps under the Lex Acilia de repetundis, or laesa maiestas, an offense against the dignity of the state, have both been proposed. Carbo was convicted, and committed suicide.

Eburnus was elected consul for 116 with Gaius Licinius Geta. He seems to have been the proconsul of Macedonia recorded as sending a letter to the Dymaeans, and if the identification is correct, he would have served from 115 to 114 BC. In 113, either he or Quintus Fabius Maximus Allobrogicus was the diplomatic legate sent to Crete.

In 108, he was censor with his co-consul, though as with some of his other offices, Allobrogicus has also been proposed as the Quintus Fabius Maximus who served. The censors of this year reappointed Marcus Aemilius Scaurus as princeps senatus.

== Eburnus and Roman morals ==
Eburnus's claim to fame was his severity by Late Republican Roman standards. As pater familias, he condemned to death one of his sons for "immorality" or "unchastity".

As a youth, however, Eburnus had earned his agnomen "Ivory" because of his fair good looks (candor), and had the nickname "Jove's chick" (pullus Iovis). He was said to have been struck by lightning on his buttocks, perhaps meaning a birthmark, hence the joking reference to him as a catamite of the lightning-wielding king of the gods. It has been observed that the contrast between Eburnus's reputation as "Jove's chick" and his later excessive severity against the impudicitia of his son is "thought-provoking".

He was reviled for his son's death, and accused by Gnaeus Pompeius Strabo (possibly the consul of 89 BC) for having exceeded the limits of patria potestas. Eburnus went into exile in Nuceria.

Political offices
Preceded by Lucius Caecilius Metellus Diadematus and Quintus Mucius Scaevola Augur	Consul of the Roman Republic with Gaius Licinius Geta; 116 BC	Succeeded by Marcus Aemilius Scaurus and Marcus Caecilius Metellus
