= Quintus Marcius Rex (consul 118 BC) =

Roman consul in 118 BC

Quintus Marcius Rex was a member of the Marcii Reges, the family founded by the Roman King Ancus Marcius. His father Quintus Marcius Rex, the praetor in 144 BC, built the Aqua Marcia aqueduct, the longest aqueduct of ancient Rome. The aqueduct was known for its water purity and its cold temperature.

Marcius carried on a war against the Stoeni, a Ligurian people at the foot of the Alps, and obtained a triumph in the following year on account of his victories over them. During his consulship in 118 BC, Marcius lost his only son, a youth of great promise, but had such mastery over his feelings as to meet the senate on the day of his son's burial, and perform his regular official duties.

His sister Marcia was the mother of Sextus Julius Caesar; Julia, wife of Gaius Marius; and Gaius Julius Caesar, father of Julius Caesar the dictator.

Through his son, possibly named Quintus Marcius Rex, he had a grandson also named Quintus Marcius Rex, who was the consul in 68 BC.

Political offices
| Preceded by Lucius Aurelius Cotta and Lucius Caecilius Metellus Dalmaticus | Consul of the Roman Republic with Marcus Porcius Cato; 118 BC | Succeeded by Lucius Caecilius Metellus Diadematus and Quintus Mucius Scaevola |
