= Caecilia Metella (daughter of Delmaticus) =

Third wife of Roman dictator Sulla

Caecilia Metella (died around 80 BC) was a Roman matron at the beginning of the 1st century BC. The daughter of the pontifex maximus Lucius Caecilius Metellus Dalmaticus, she married two of the most prominent politicians of the period, first the princeps senatus Marcus Aemilius Scaurus, then Lucius Cornelius Sulla.

== Life ==
Caecilia belonged to the plebeian family of the Caecilii Metelli, at the time the most important family of the late second century. Her father was Lucius Caecilius Metellus Dalmaticus, consul in 119 BC and pontifex maximus circa 114.

Her first marriage was to Marcus Aemilius Scaurus, an ageing politician at the peak of his power. Scaurus was a patrician, the princeps senatus (leader of the Roman Senate) and a traditional ally of her family. Caecilia bore Scaurus two children: Marcus Aemilius Scaurus and Aemilia.

Following Scaurus' death in 89, Caecilia married Lucius Cornelius Sulla, who was fifty. In his account of the life of Sulla, Plutarch wrote that this was a prestigious marriage for Sulla due to Caecilia being the daughter of the Pontifex Maximus, the high priest of Roman state religion. The marriage was ridiculed by the people and many leading men were dissatisfied because they thought that it was unworthy of Caecilia. She became Sulla's fourth wife and he married her only a few days after divorcing Cloelia for 'barrenness'. Because of this and despite the fact that Sulla praised Cloelia and gave her gifts, many thought that he had accused her unfairly. However, he always showed Caecilia great deference. Because of this, when Sulla refused the request of the people to restore the exiled supporters of Marius (after Sulla's march on Rome in 88 BC) they asked Caecilia for help. Plutarch wrote that it "was thought also that when [Sulla] took the city of Athens, he treated its people more harshly because they had scurrilously abused Caecilia from the walls." In another passage, Plutarch specified that the scurrilous abuse against Sulla and Caecilia was from Aristion, the tyrant of Athens.

Sulla had her daughter Aemilia marry to Pompey to forge an alliance with him.

While Sulla was in Greece, the supporters of Gaius Marius seized Rome and perpetrated violence against those of Sulla. Caecilia thus fled with her and Sulla's children with difficulty, informed Sulla that his villas had been burned and offered to help the Optimates (who supported Sulla) at home. After Sulla celebrated his triumph for his victory in Greece, Caecilia bore him twin children, "[Sulla] named the male child Faustus, and the female Fausta; for the Romans call what is auspicious and joyful, 'faustum.'"

While Sulla was devoting a lavish feast in honour of the god Hercules, Caecilia was sick and dying. The priests forbade Sulla "to go near her or to have his house polluted by her funeral." Sulla divorced her and had her taken to another house while she was still alive. In this way he respected the law. Sulla transgressed his laws limiting the expenses of funerals and of banquets, organised a sumptuous funeral and drowned his sorrows in drinking parties and extravagant banquets. Plutarch mentioned that another, unnamed son who died shortly before the death of his mother Caecilia appeared to him in a dream. Plutarch clarified this by saying that when Sulla died he left two young children by Caecilia.

== See also ==
- Women in ancient Rome
- Caecilia gens
- Caecilii Metelli family tree
