= Marcus Caecilius Metellus (consul 115 BC) =

Roman senator and general

Marcus Caecilius Metellus (fl. 127–111 BC) was a Roman senator and general. He belonged to the Caecilii Metelli, one of the most prominent aristocratic families in the mid to late Roman Republic. Marcus was the third of four sons of Quintus Caecilius Metellus Macedonicus.

Marcus was a triumvir monetalis (i.e. one of three moneyers) in 127 BC, and was consul in 115 BC with Marcus Aemilius Scaurus as his colleague (he presumably had held the praetorship by 118 BC, in accordance to the Villian law). The following year, Metellus became proconsular governor of Corsica and Sardinia, serving until 111 BC. During his tenure, Metellus suppressed an insurrection on the island of Sardinia, for which he celebrated, upon his return to Rome, a triumph in Quintilis (July) 111 BC. Marcus's younger brother, Gaius Caecilius Metellus Caprarius, also celebrated his own triumph on the same day, for his victories in Thrace.

== See also ==
- Caecilii Metelli family tree

Political offices
| Preceded by Gaius Licinius Geta; Q. Fabius Maximus Eburnus | Roman consul 115 BC; With: Marcus Aemilius Scaurus | Succeeded by Manius Acilius Balbus; Gaius Porcius Cato |
