= Macedonia (Roman province) =

Roman province

Macedonia Μακεδονία
- Province of the Roman Empire
- 146 BC–306 AD
- The province of Macedonia within the Roman Empire, circa 125
- Capital: Thessalonica in Late Antiquity: Thessalonica (Macedonia Prima); Stobi (Macedonia Salutaris)
- Historical era: Antiquity
  - Established: 146 BC
  - Transformed into the Diocese of Macedonia: 306 AD
Preceded by
Antigonid Macedonia
Epirus (ancient state)
Thessalian League
Roman Protectorate of Illyricum
Succeeded by
Diocese of Macedonia
- Today part of: Greece; North Macedonia; Albania; Bulgaria

Macedonia (Latin: Macedonia; Ancient Greek: Μακεδονία) was a province of ancient Rome, encompassing the territory of Antigonid Macedonia, which had been conquered by the Roman Republic in 168 BC at the conclusion of the Third Macedonian War. The province was created in 146 BC, after the Roman general Quintus Caecilius Metellus defeated Andriscus of Macedon, the last self-styled King of Macedonia in the Fourth Macedonian War. The province incorporated the former ancient Greek Kingdom of Macedonia with the addition of Epirus, Thessaly, and parts of Illyria, Paeonia and Thrace.

During the Republican period, the province was of great military significance, as the main bulwark protecting the Aegean region from attacks from the north. The Via Egnatia, which crossed the province from west to east was of great strategic importance, providing the main overland link between Rome and its domains in the Eastern Mediterranean. In this period, campaigns against the Dardani and Scordisci to the north and the Thracians to the east were nearly constant. By the first century BC, the province notionally extended to the Danube.

Macedonia was a central theatre for several campaigns of the civil wars at the end of the Republic, including the Battles of Pharsalus and Philippi. During the Second Triumvirate, it fell within Marc Antony's sphere. Several important Roman military colonies were established in Macedonia in this period. After the province came under the control of Augustus following the Battle of Actium in 30 BC, the northern sections were split off as the provinces of Moesia, Dalmatia and Pannonia, meaning that the province lost much of its military role in defending the Danube border, but it remained important for supply purposes and as a source of military manpower. Until AD 15 and again after AD 44, Macedonia was a senatorial province, governed by a proconsul.

Throughout the Imperial period, Macedonia was a prosperous region with several thriving cities, notably Thessalonica and Philippi. These communities were organised in a similar way to other cities of the Roman Empire and were largely self-governing. Greek was the main language of the region, but Latin was used for official purposes and in the Roman colonies. There were substantial Christian communities in the province by the mid-first century AD.

In late antiquity, the province was split into several smaller units, but the old provincial capital, Thessalonica, became the regional centre for the Balkan region and was briefly an Imperial capital under Licinius. The provincial system gradually faded away, until it was replaced altogether by the theme system in the mid-seventh century AD, but the region continued to form part of the Eastern Roman Empire until the end of the fourteenth century.

== History ==
=== Macedonian Wars ===
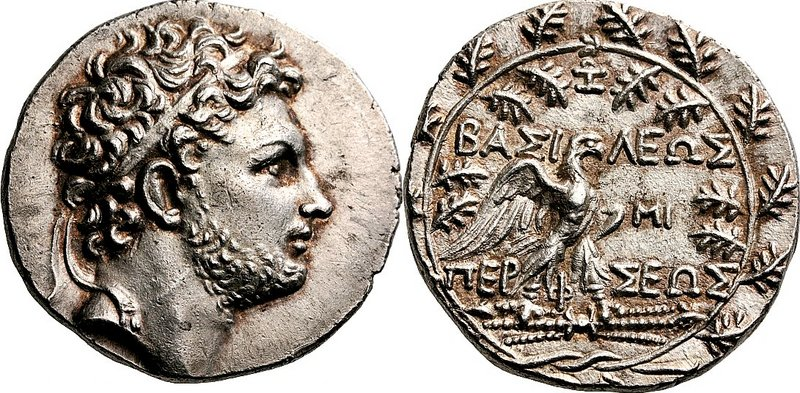
Tetradrachm of Perseus, minted between 179–172 BC at Pella or Amphipolis.

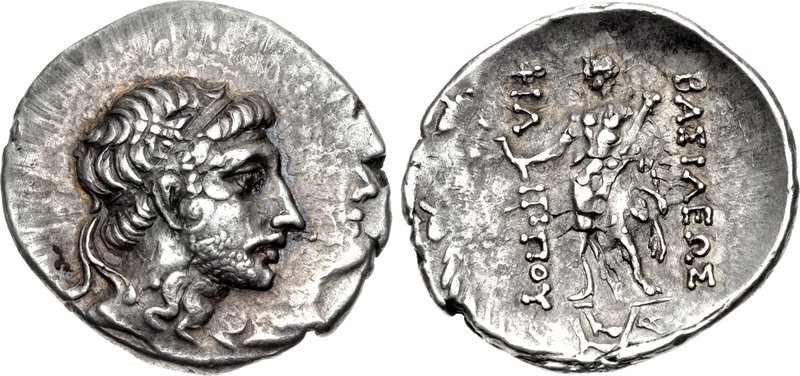
Coin issued by Andriscus during the Fourth Macedonian War (149–148 BC).

The Romans clashed with the Macedonian kingdom in three wars in the early third century BC. After defeating Perseus in the Third Macedonian War, Rome abolished the Macedonian monarchy and divided Macedon into four client republics, called merides, with capitals located at Amphipolis, Thessalonica, Pella, and Pelagonia, which were members of a federal league, the League of the Macedonians. Numismatic evidence indicates that the cult of Roma was introduced at this time, being depicted on coins of Amphipolis, Pella, and Thessalonica in this period. Thessaly had been separated from the Macedonian monarchy already, following the Second Macedonian War and a separate Thessalian League was created with Roman permission in 194 BC, with Zeus Eleutherius ('of Freedom') and Athena Itonia as its patron deities. Its coinage superseded that of the individual Thessalian cities and continued until the end of the first century BC.

The kingdom was briefly reunited in 150 BC by the pretender Andriscus (or 'Pseudo-Philip'), leading to the Fourth Macedonian War. After defeating Andriscus near Pydna in 148 BC, Quintus Caecilius Metellus Macedonicus made Macedonia into Rome's fifth provincia - the first new province since the creation of Hispania Ulterior and Citerior in 197 BC. Surviving sources do not explicitly discuss how or why it was decided to convert the region into a permanent province. A number of factors may have been involved, including increased familiarity with territorial expansion, the proven failure of the previous system to maintain the peace, the desire for a new base from which further military expeditions could be undertaken in order to acquire booty and triumphs, and the desire for further tax revenue. The four merides continued to exist as subdivisions of the province, as did the federal league. The date of the establishment of the province in autumn 148 BC is indicated by the epoch date of the provincial era, but in practice it may have been a gradual process.

=== Republican province ===
At its creation, the province of Macedonia encompassed Macedon itself, Paeonia and parts of Illyria, Thessaly to the south, and Epirus to the west. Notionally, the northern border ran from Lissus on the Adriatic coast, eastwards until it reached the Hebrus river, which formed the eastern border with Thrace. These borders were only loosely defined and dependent on the military competence of the governors, with Cicero claiming that "for the governors of Macedonia, the borders were always the same as those marked by swords and shields." The capital was Thessalonica and the governor held proconsular status.

Two years after the foundation of the new province, in 146 BC, Romans defeated the Achaean League in the Achaean War and gained control of the rest of Mainland Greece. Scholars disagree on whether or not Achaia was formally incorporated into the province of Macedonia following this defeat, but intermittent interventions in Achaian affairs by the governors are attested.

==== Via Egnatia ====
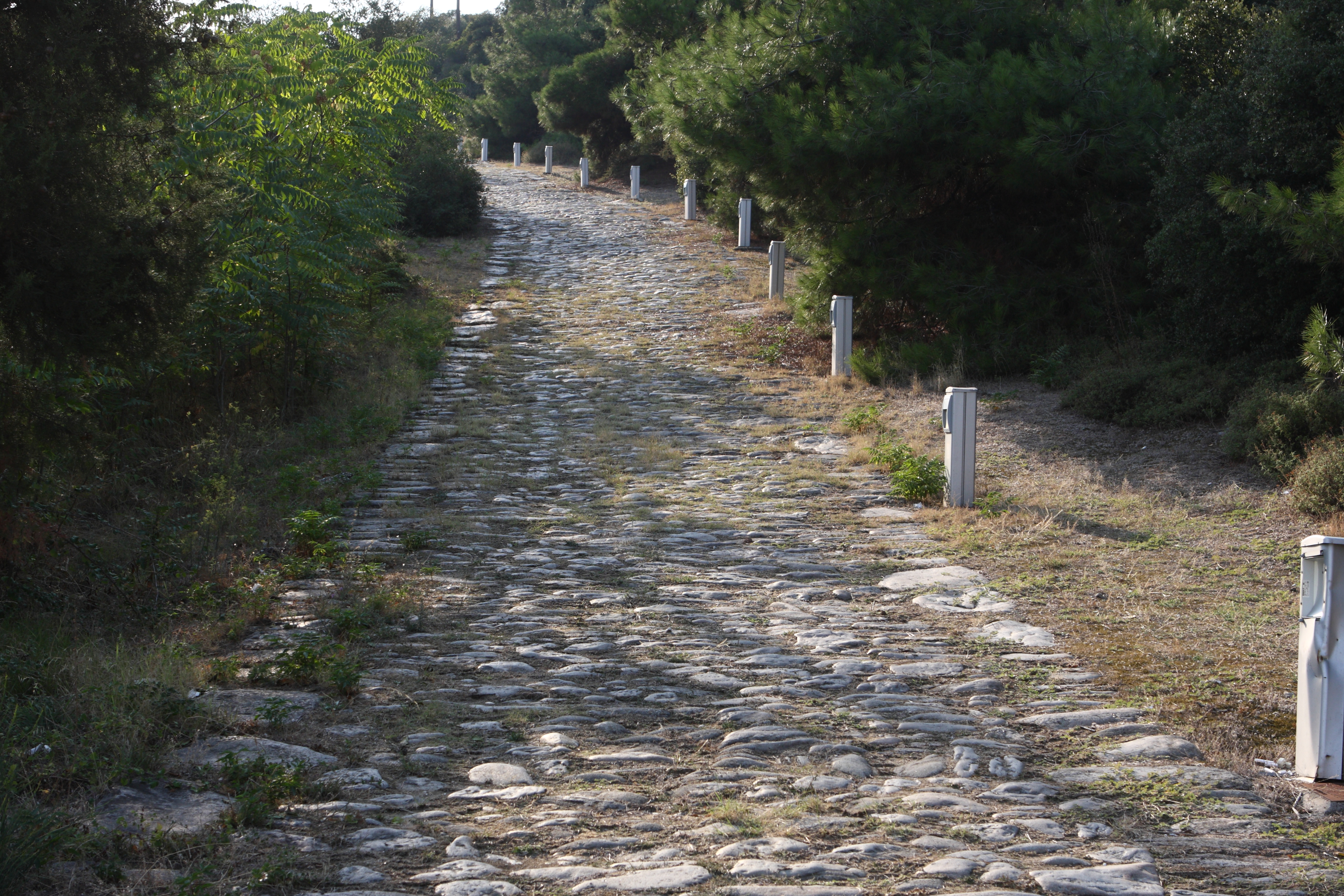
Ancient Via Egnatia in Kavala (Neapolis)

Sometime after 146 BC, Gnaeus Egnatius initiated the construction of the Via Egnatia, a Roman road, which began at Dyrrhachium on the Adriatic coast opposite the terminus of the Via Appia in Italy, stretched across the Pindus mountains and continued through Macedonia to Thessalonica, and from there to Cypsela, on the east bank of the Hebrus river. This stretch was completed by 120 BC; it followed a pre-existing route, but was a more solid, level road than the previous road, with a width of between three and six metres. A second road from the Adriatic coast at Apollonia, which joined the main Via Egnatia somewhere inland was added shortly after 120 BC. Later in the second century BC, the eastern end of the road was extended all the way to the Byzantium. The road was important for military and economic purposes, providing the main overland link between Rome and its domains in the Eastern Mediterranean.

==== Northern and eastern campaigns ====
Macedonia was of central importance to Roman military strategy in this period as a bulwark against attacks from the north. The Dardani to the northwest, had initially supported the Romans in their conquest of Macedonia, but after 148 BC, they increasingly came into conflict with the Romans. There were also occasional conflicts with the Thracians to the east. However, the key enemy of the Romans in this period were the Scordisci, a Celtic group that largely supplanted the Dardanians as the most powerful group in the central Balkans. They first invaded Macedonia in 149 BC during the Fourth Macedonian War and had to be driven out by Metellus.

In the first years of the province two pretenders attempted to restore the Macedonian kingdom. The first, Alexander, invaded from Thrace in 148 BC and was defeated by Metellus. The second, referred to in the sources as 'Pseudo-Philip' or 'Pseudo-Perseus' also invaded from the east, in 143 or 142, with an army of up to 16,000 men, but was defeated by the quaestor Tremellus Scrofa. The Scordisci invaded in 141 BC and defeated a Roman army commanded by Decimus Junius Silanus Manlianus or, less likely, Publius Cornelius Scipio Nasica. In belated response to this defeat, Marcus Cosconius launched an attack on the Scordisci in 135 BC, defeating them in Thrace. The delay may have been because Roman attention was focussed on the construction of the Via Egnatia.

In 119 BC, the Scordisci invaded again, ravaging the area near Stobi. The praetor Sextus Pompeius met the forces in battle and was killed, leaving his quaestor Marcus Annius to regroup and drive the Scordisci out, defeating a second invasion with the help of the Thracians. Following this set-back, a series of consuls were sent to Macedonia, apparently to settle the threat from the Scordisci decisively. The first of these, Quintus Fabius Maximus Eburnus arrived in 115 BC but his activities are not attested. In 114 BC, his successor, Gaius Porcius Cato launched a large-scale invasion, but he was defeated and nearly the whole army was killed. The Romans dispatched several further commanders, Gaius Caecilius Metellus Caprarius in 113 BC and Marcus Livius Drusus in 112, who inflicted defeats on the Thracians and the Scordisci respectively. From 110 to 107 BC, Marcus Minucius Rufus campaigned against the Scordisci and the Bessian tribe of Thracians to the east, bringing an end to their raids for about twenty years.

After this, the Romans turned their attention to the eastern border. The Romans defeated some Thracians under an unnamed commander in 104 BC. In 101 or 100 BC, Titus Didius conquered an area referred to as the "Caenic Chersonese" (exact location unknown, but some region of the Thracian coast). Another unnamed commander defeated the Maedian Thracians in the east and the Dardanians in the northwest in 97 BC. Gaius Sentius was defeated by the Maedi in 92 BC and was involved in a conflict with a Thracian king called Sordinus in 89 BC, only achieving victory after a struggle. From 87 BC onwards, Thracian forces allied with Mithridates VI attacked Macedonia, as part of the First Mithridatic War. In that year, Gaius Sentius' legate Quintus Bruttius Sura repulsed an invasion from the Mithridatic general Archelaus. In 84 BC a force of Scordisci, Dardianians and Maedi penetrated all the way to Delphi and sacked the sanctuary, before they were violently expelled by Lucius Cornelius Scipio Asiaticus (consul 83 BC).

Map of Scythia Minor (Dobruja), showing the main area of Scythian habitation in the 3rd-2nd centuries BC and the Greek coastal cities of Istros, Tomis, Callatis, Dionysoupolis, and Odessus.

In the aftermath of the Mithridatic Wars, the Romans again launched a concerted military effort in the region. Before the war, governors had tended to be praetors or propraetors, usually in office for a single year. Henceforth, they were consuls or proconsuls and often held command for several years. Appius Claudius Pulcher had some success in the Rhodope Mountains in 77 BC, but was replaced after his death from illness by C. Scribonius Curio, who was given a force of five legions. He campaigned from 75 to 74 BC, becoming the first Roman commander to lead an army to the Danube and reduced the Dardanians to submission. Between 73 and 71 BC, Marcus Terentius Varro Lucullus led another force of five legions against the Bessi and entered Moesia, bringing the Greek cities on the west coast of the Black Sea under Roman control and campaigning against the Getae all the way to the mouth of the Danube. These campaigns were intended to secure the northern border so that Macedonia and Greece would no longer be threatened by raids and to put Rome in a better position to confront Mithridates VI in future conflicts. Efforts to consolidate these enormous conquests continued for decades, often meeting with rebuffs, most notably the two campaigns of Gaius Antonius Hybrida in the north ca. 62-61 BC, in which he was defeated disastrously by the Dardianians and at the Battle of Histria by the Bastarnae.

The governorship of Lucius Calpurnius Piso Caesoninus from 57 to 55 BC is the subject of Cicero's In Pisonem, in which Caesoninus is accused of corruption, abuse, and murder of the provincials on a grand scale, as well as having sparked another invasion by the Dardianians and Bessi that even placed Thessaloniki under siege, but the speech may not give an accurate picture of Caesoninus' conduct.

==== Civil wars ====
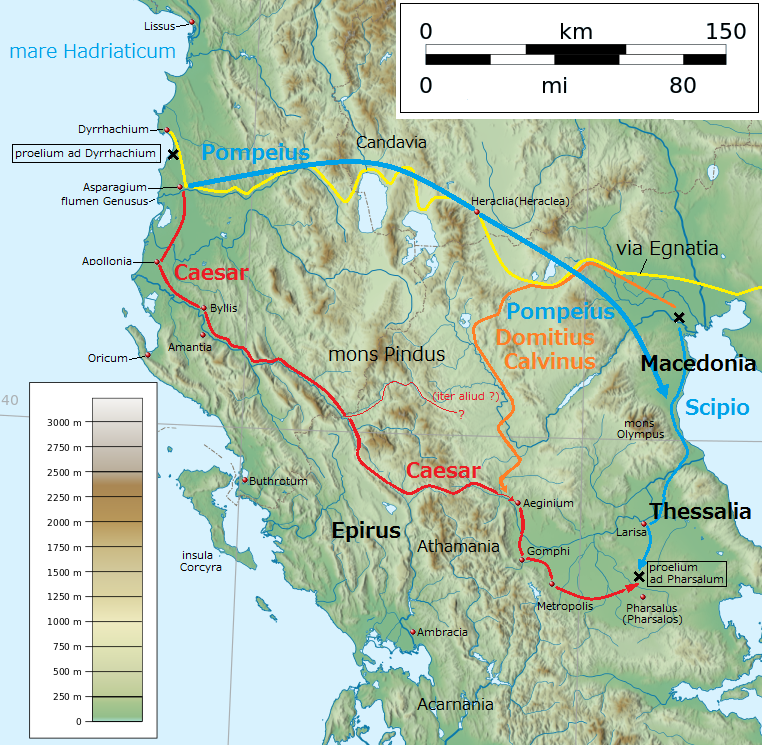
Map of the Pharsalus campaign, 48 BC.

Map of the Philippi campaign, 42 BC.

Macedonia was one of the main arenas of the civil wars at the end of the Roman Republic. When Julius Caesar crossed the Rubicon in 49 BC, starting Caesar's Civil War, his opponents, led by Pompey abandoned Italy and retreated to Macedonia with five legions. Around two hundred Senators set themselves up in Thessalonica as a Senate in exile and raised a further legion from veterans in Macedonia and Crete. At the beginning of 48 BC, Caesar crossed the Adriatic and besieged Pompey at Dyrrhachium. During this period, one Menedemos came to Caesar as a delegate from "the part of the province that was called free" offering him support; he was subsequently captured by Pompey's forces and executed. After several months, Pompey broke out of Dyrrhachium and headed southeast toward Thessaly. On the march he was met by another Macedonian, Acornion of Dionysiopolis, who came offering an alliance with Burebista, the king of Dacia. However, this offer had come too late to be of use to Pompey. Caesar decisively defeated him at the Battle of Pharsalus in August 48 BC and he fled for Egypt. On taking control of the province, Caesar separated it from Greece to the south for the first time. This division was reversed after his death in 44 BC, but would be revived in the Imperial period.

After the assassination of Julius Caesar in 44 BC, the assassins, led by Brutus and Cassius, also fled east. Caesar's former lieutenant, Mark Antony passed a law requiring the governor, Quintus Hortensius Hortalus to hand the province over to Antony. Instead, he chose to place the province under Brutus' control - a move that was recognised by the Senate in 43 BC. This led Mark Antony to ally with Octavian in the Second Triumvirate and invade Macedonia, defeating Brutus and his forces at the Battle of Philippi in 42 BC.

After Philippi, Macedonia fell within the territories assigned to Mark Antony and it was governed by his legates until war broke out between Octavian and Antony in 32 BC and Antony was defeated in 31 BC at the Battle of Actium, after which Macedonia and the rest of the Eastern Mediterranean came under Octavian's control, marking the beginning of the Principate.

=== Principate ===
The Roman Empire under Hadrian (ruled 117–38), showing the senatorial province of Macedonia in southeastern Europe

Following Actium, Octavian entrusted Macedonia to the proconsul M. Licinius Crassus, grandson of Crassus the triumvir, who led a campaign into the north that lasted until 27 BC, finally subjugating the whole region south of the Danube, for which he was granted a triumph.

In the Augustan Settlement of 27 BC, provinces were divided into two categories: imperial provinces, which fell were governed by legates appointed by the Emperor, and senatorial provinces, which continued to be governed by senators who had previously served as consuls or praetors. Most of the provinces with a large military presence on the borders of the empire were Imperial provinces, but Macedonia was anomalous in being a senatorial province despite its military significance. The territories south of Thermopylae and the Ceraunian Mountains now became the separate province of Achaia. This province included the territory which would become the province of Epirus (later Epirus Vetus) under Emperor Trajan.

Moesia was split off as a separate military command some time before 10 BC, and had become a separate province by AD 6. Territories to the northwest of Macedonia in Illyricum were separated off into the provinces of Dalmatia and Pannonia. In AD 15, complaints about the corruption of the governors led Tiberius to convert Macedonia and Achaia into imperial provinces, under the control of the governor of Moesia, but Claudius made them both Senatorial provinces once more in AD 44 In the same year, the portion of Macedonia between the Hebrus and Nestus rivers in the east and the island of Thasos were handed over to the newly created province of Thrace.

The establishment of new provinces to the north and the consolidation of Roman control in the Balkans in general led to a decline in the military importance of Macedonia to Rome, as the legions defending the northern border were henceforth based in Dalmatia, Moesia, and Thrace. Nevertheless, the province continued to provide a vital role in the transport of supplies from Italy to the northern and eastern borders of the Empire, as well as serving as a source of manpower.

==== Organisation ====
The cities of the province had a range of different statuses. Six Roman colonies (coloniae) were established in the Triumviral period: Cassandrea, established in the late 40s BC by the proconsul Quintus Hortensius Hortalus, Philippi (Colonia Iulia Augusta Philippensis) founded by Antony's legate Quintus Paquius Rufus, Dium, Pella, Byllis, and Dyrrhachium. These communities were settled with veterans who became or remained Roman citizens. Local inhabitants of these communities were not expelled, but they did not receive citizenship of the new colonies or of Rome, except perhaps for some members of the local elite. Some scholars have suggested that these coloniae formed "double communities," with the old Greek city-state (polis) and the new colonia existing side-by-side. This now seems unlikely, but has not been disproven. Stobi was a municipium. Amphipolis, Thessalonica, Abdera, and Maroneia held the status of 'free cities' (civitates liberae), and Edessa was probably an 'allied city' (civitas foederata).

In the Republican period a cult of "the Roman Benefactors" (Rhomaioi euergetai), the goddess Roma, and Zeus "Eleutherios" ("of freedom") developed in Macedonia. This cult is first attested in 95 or possibly 119 BC, but probably dates back to the establishment of the province. It endured in the Imperial period. The Roman Imperial cult was introduced under Augustus, with numismatic and epigraphic evidence attesting to the worship of Julius Caesar as Divus Julius following Actium. Under Tiberius, cults of Augustus and of Livia are attested as well, while divine honours for Caligula and subsequent emperors are attested during their own lifetimes.

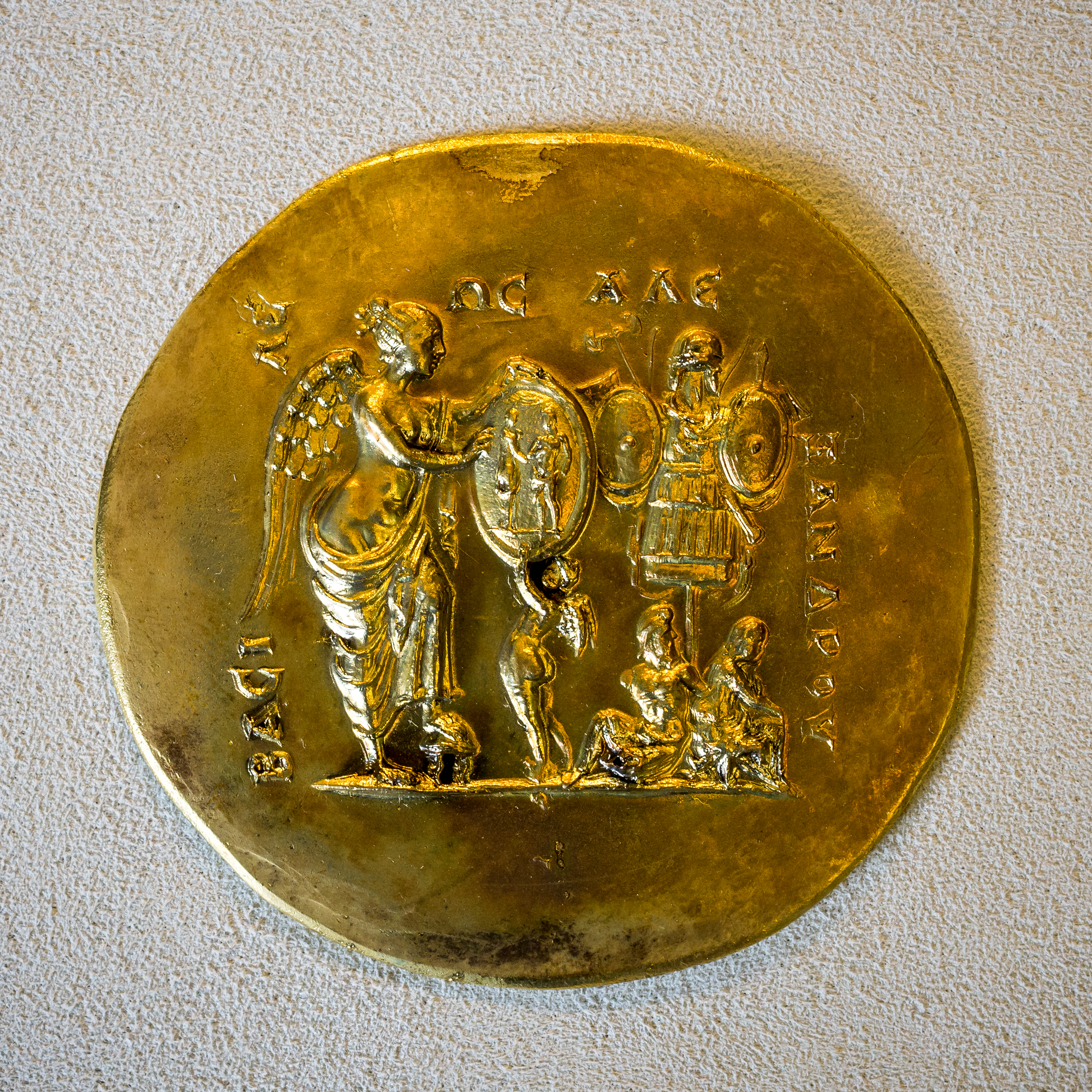
Gold medallion in honour of Alexander the Great minted by the Macedonian League, early 3rd century AD

The cities of Macedonia were arranged into the League of the Macedonians (Greek: koinon ton Makedonon), with its seat at Beroea. This league was a continuation of an institution first attested under Philip V. From 27 BC, they used their own "Macedonian era," in which the years were counted from the Battle of Actium in 31/30 BC. In the Imperial period, its main duties related to the Imperial cult, especially the organisation of games in honour of the emperors. It also hosted a local version of the Olympic games, and from AD 229, games in honour of Alexander the Great. From the time of the emperor Claudius until the end of the second century AD, the league minted its own coinage, with the thunderbolt, a traditional symbol of Macedon on the reverse. In the third century AD, the league continued to mint coinage, but with new types, relating to athletic competition. Through this institution, Macedonian identity and loyalty to the Roman emperor were closely aligned.

There was a separate civic league for the Thessalians.

=== Late Antiquity ===
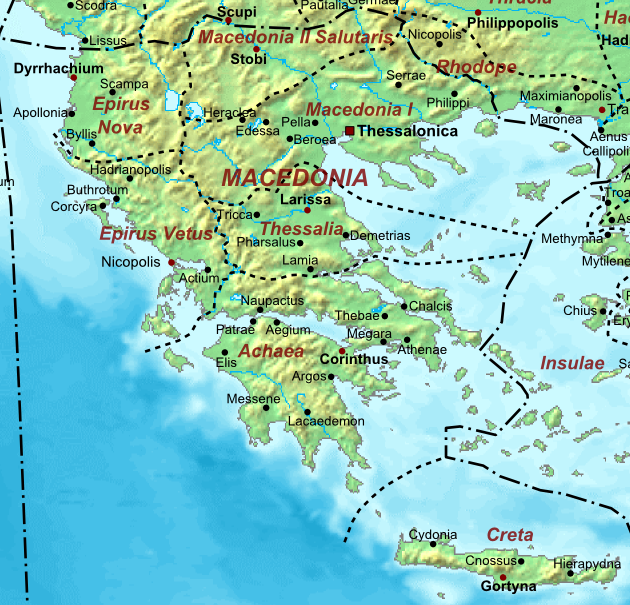
Roman provinces in the Balkans after the reform of Diocletian. Note Herakleia Lynkestis (and therefore the northwestern boundary of Macedonia Prima) is shown too far south-east and is actually situated 2 km (1.2 mi) south of the present-day town of Bitola, North Macedonia.

The reforms of Diocletian around AD 293 saw provinces replaced by dioceses and praetorian prefectures as the first order subdivision of the Roman Empire and provinces began to be split into smaller units. The province of Macedonia was initially part of the Diocese of Moesia, but subsequently became part of a new Diocese of Macedonia (administered from Thessaloniki), one of three dioceses comprising the praetorian prefecture of Illyricum (administered from Sirmium until 379, then from Thessaloniki). Meanwhile, the province of Macedonia was divided into a number of smaller provinces.

- Macedonia Prima ("First Macedonia"), encompassing most of the Kingdom of Macedonia, coinciding with most of the modern Greek region of Macedonia, and had Thessalonica as its capital.
- Macedonia Salutaris ("Wholesome Macedonia"), also known as Macedonia Secunda ("Second Macedonia"), partially encompassing Pelagonia and containing the whole of Paeonia. The province mostly coincides with the present-day North Macedonia. The town of Stobi located to the junction of the Crna Reka and Vardar rivers, the former capital of Paeonia, became the provincial capital.
- Thessalia encompassed the area of ancient Thessaly, in the south of ancient Macedonia and was subdivided into Thessalia Prima and Thessalia Secunda.
- Epirus Nova ("New Epirus") or Illyria Graeca or Illyris proper, which was established by Diocletian, was the first province to be divided off. Dyrrachium (or Epidamnus) was the capital. The region of Epirus Nova corresponded to a portion of Illyria that was then "partly Hellenic and partly Hellenized".

When the Prefecture of Macedonia was divided between the Western and Eastern Empires in 379, the Macedonian provinces were included in Eastern Illyricum. With the permanent division of the Empire in 395, Macedonia passed to the Eastern Empire.

Jewish communities were present in the Balkans during this period of administrative reform. Koine Greek-speaking Jews, part of the broader Hellenized diaspora, are attested in cities such as Stobi, Naissus, and Salona—all located within the reorganized provinces of Illyricum and Macedonia. These Jewish populations appear to have practiced Judaism aligned with Jerusalem-based traditions, independent from the Babylonian halakhic centers of the east. Archaeological evidence from Stobi, including a synagogue with Greek mosaic inscriptions, points to a well-integrated but culturally distinct Jewish presence. These communities were likely affected by the same urban reforms and diocesan realignments as other provincial groups, and their continued presence through Late Antiquity suggests a degree of local autonomy and adaptation within imperial religious frameworks.

=== Economy ===
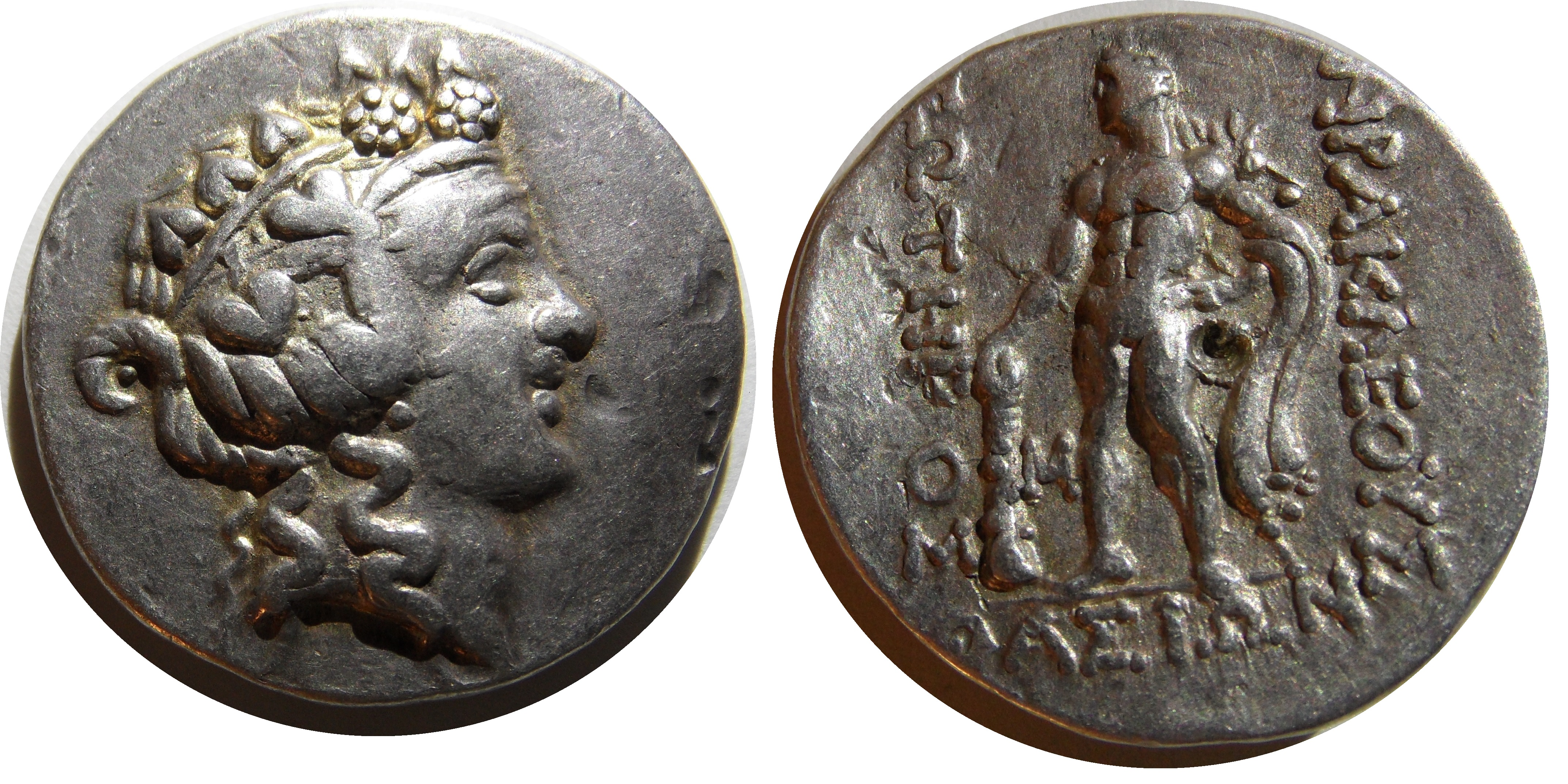
A tetradrachm of Thasos from Roman-controlled Macedonia. It was minted between 148 and 80 BC. Obverse shows Dionysos and reverse shows Herakles.

The reign of Augustus (27 BC–14 AD) began a long period of peace, prosperity and wealth for Macedonia, although its importance in the economic standing of the Roman world diminished when compared to its neighbor, Asia Minor.

The economy was greatly stimulated by the construction of the Via Egnatia during 130s and 120s BC, the installation of Roman merchants in the cities, and the founding of Roman colonies. The Imperial government brought, along with its roads and administrative system, an economic boom, which benefited both the Roman ruling class and the lower classes. With vast arable and rich pastures, the great ruling families amassed huge fortunes in the society based on slave labor.

The improvement of the living conditions of the productive classes brought about an increase in the number artisans and craftspeople to the region. Stonemasons, miners, blacksmiths, etc. were employed in every kind of commercial activity and craft. Greek people were also widely employed as tutors, educators and doctors throughout the Roman world.

The export economy was based essentially on agriculture and livestock, while iron, copper, and gold along with such products as timber, resin, pitch, hemp, flax, and fish were also exported. Another source of wealth was the kingdom's ports, such as Thessalonica and Cassandreia.

== List of Roman governors ==
=== Republican ===
Governors of Macedonia (148-30 BC)
Governor	Dates	Title
Quintus Caecilius Metellus Macedonicus	148-146 BC	Praetor proconsul
Gnaeus Egnatius	ca. 145 BC	Proconsul
Aulus Licinius Nerva	143 or 142 BC	Praetor
Publius Cornelius Scipio Nasica Corculum	142/1 or 141/0 BC	
Decimus Junius Silanus Manlianus	141 BC	Praetor
Quintus Calpurnius Piso	138 or 137 BC	Praetor
Marcus Cosconius	135-133 BC	Praetor
Tiberius (Latinius) Pandusa	129 BC	Praetor
Publius Cornelius Lentulus	128 BC	
Sextus Pompeius	119 BC	Praetor
Marcus Annius	119 BC	Quaestor
Gnaeus Cornelius Sisenna	118 BC	Praetor proconsul
Quintus Fabius Maximus Eburnus	116-114 BC	Consul; Proconsul
Gaius Porcius Cato	114 BC	Consul
Gaius Caecilius Metellus Caprarius	113-112 BC	Consul; Proconsul
Marcus Livius Drusus	112-111 BC	Consul
Marcus Minucius Rufus	110-106 BC	Praetor proconsul
Gaius Billienus	after 106 BC?	Praetor proconsul
Gaius Clivius	after 104 BC?	Praetor proconsul
Gaius Servilius Vatia	before 100 BC?	
Titus Didius	101-100 BC	
Lucius Aurelius	ca. 100 BC	Praetor proconsul
Gnaeus Pompeius Strabo	between 104 and 93 BC	
Lucius Julius Caesar	94 BC	Praetor proconsul
Gaius Sentius	93—87 BC	Praetor proconsul
Sulla	86-84 BC	Proconsul
Lucius Hortensius	85 BC	Legatus
Lucius Cornelius Scipio Asiaticus	85-84 BC	
Gnaeus Cornelius Dolabella	80—78 BC	Proconsul
Appius Claudius Pulcher	78—76 BC	Proconsul
Gaius Scribonius Curio	75—72 BC	Proconsul
Marcus Terentius Varro Lucullus	72-71 BC	Proconsul
Lucius Quinctius Rufus	68-67 BC?	Proconsul
Rubrius	67-66 BC	Praetor
Lucius Manlius Torquatus	64-63 BC	Proconsul
Gaius Antonius Hybrida	62-60 BC	Proconsul
Gaius Octavius	60-59 BC	Praetor proconsul
Lucius Culleolus	59/58 BC	Proconsul
Lucius Appuleius Saturninus	58 BC	Praetor
Lucius Calpurnius Piso Caesoninus	57—55 BC	Proconsul
Quintus Ancharius	55-54 BC	Praetor proconsul
Gaius Cosconius	ca. 53-51 BC	Praetor proconsul
Gnaeus Tremellius Scrofa or Marcus Nonius Sufenas	51-50 BC	
Titus Antistius	49 BC	Quaestor propraetor
Decimus Laelius	45-44 BC	Legatus
Quintus Hortensius Hortalus	44-42 BC	Proconsul
Gaius Antonius	43 BC	Proconsul
Marcus Junius Brutus	43-42 BC	Proconsul
Lucius Marcius Censorinus	42-40 BC	Legatus proconsul
Gaius Asinius Pollio	40-39 BC	Legatus proconsul
Quintus Paquius Rufus	ca. 30s BC?	Legatus proconsul
Titus Statilius Taurus	31-30 BC?	Legatus proconsul

=== Imperial ===
- Marcus Licinius Crassus (31-27 BC)
- Marcus Primus (c.24/23 BC)
- Lucius Tarius Rufus (18-16 BC)
- Publius Vinicius (AD 2/3)
- Publius Memmius Regulus (with Achaea, between AD 31 and 37)
- Marcus Helvius Geminus (before 54)
- Marcus Julius Romulus (between 54 and 68)
- Marcus Vettius Bolanus (before 66)
- Lucius Antonius Saturninus (76/77)
- P. Tullius Varro (between 70 and 79)
- Lucius Baebius Honoratus (before 83)
- Gaius Salvius Liberalis (84/85)
- L. Cocceius Justus (c. 100)
- Q. Annius Maximus (113/114)
- M. Arruntius Claudianus (between 96 and 118)
- Octavius Antoninus (119/120)
- Lucius Varius Ambibulus (124/125)
- Junius Rufinus (between 118 and 138)
- Q. Gellius Sentius Augurinus (between 118 and 139)
- [Iul]ius [Fr]ugi (c. 138)
- Sextus Pedius Hirrutus Lucilius Pollio (c. 148)
- P. Antius Orestes (164/165)
- Publius Julius Geminius Marcianus (c. 166)
- [... A]qu[i]linus (between 139 and 180)
- Cornelius Rufus (between 161 and 180)
- Ti. Claudius Gordianus (between 187 and 192)
- Junius Rufinus (192/193)
- Marcus Antius Crescens Calpurnianus (c. 200)
- (M. Ulipus ?) Tertullianus Aquila (212/213 or 213/214)
- P. Aelius Coeranus (c. 224)
- T. Clodius Pupienus Pulcher Maximus (c. 223)
- Q ? or C(L.)? Valerius Rufrius Justus (between 220 and 230)
- P. Julius Junianus Martialianus (signo Leontius) (between 222 and 235)
- C. Caerellius (Fufidius Annius Ravus) Pollittianus (between 222 and 235)
- Dulcitius (c. 300)
- Calliopius of Antioch (362)

== Notable individuals ==
=== Saints and clerics ===
- Agape, Chionia, and Irene (died 304)
- Agathopous, deacon
- Aristarchus of Thessalonica, 1st century
- Demophilus of Constantinople (died 386), Bishop, born in Thessalonica
- Epaphroditus, first bishop of Philippi
- Gaius, first Bishop of Thessalonica
- Lydia of Thyatira, 1st century
- Matrona of Thessalonica
- Onesimus, first bishop of Beroea
- Saint Demetrius, patron saint of the city of Thessalonica, martyred in 306
- Theodulus, Lector

=== Writers ===
- Craterus of Amphipolis (c. 100-30 BC) Rhapsode winner in Amphiarian games
- Phaedrus of Pieria (c. 15 BC – c. AD 50), fabulist
- Antipater of Thessalonica (late 1st century BC), epigrammatic poet and governor of the city
- Philippus of Thessalonica (late 1st century AD), epigrammatic poet and compiler of the Greek Anthology
- Archias, epigrammatist
- Antiphanes (late 1st century), epigrammatist
- Parmenio (late 1st century), epigrammatist
- Criton of Pieria, historian
- Polyaenus, (2nd century), military writer
- Stobaeus (5th century), anthologist of Greek authors
- Macedonius of Thessalonica (6th century), epigrammatist of Greek Anthology

=== Physicians ===
- Athryilatus of Thasos
- Alexander of Pella
- Damian of Thessalonica
- Anthemius of Edessa
- Paul of Philippi
- Theodorus of Kato Kleines, Florina
- C. Iulius Nicetas of Lyke (Lyki) in Pella
- Aurelius Isidorus of Thessalonica
- Sextus Iulius Chariton of Amphipolis
- Servia of Thessalonica
- Pubicius [sic?] Lalus and Publicius Hermias of Beroea
- Aelius Nicolaus of Edessa
- Aptus of Dion

== See also ==
- Macedon
- Pella
- Aigai
- Diocese of Macedonia
- Macedonia (theme)
- Thessalonica (theme)
- Macedonia (region)

== Bibliography ==
- Daubner, Frank (2018). Makedonien nach den Königen (168 v. Chr.–14 n. Chr.) [Macedonia after the kings, 168 BC–14 AD]. Historia Einzelschriften, vol. 251. Stuttgart: Franz Steiner, ISBN 978-3-515-12038-8.
- Eckstein, Arthur M. (2010). "Macedonia and Rome, 221–146 BC". In Roisman, Joseph; Worthington, Ian (eds.). A Companion to Ancient Macedonia. Oxford: Wiley-Blackwell. pp. 225–250. ISBN 978-1-4051-7936-2.
- Errington, Robert Malcolm (1990). A History of Macedonia. Translated by Catherine Errington. Berkeley, Los Angeles, & Oxford: University of California Press. ISBN 0-520-06319-8.
- Hatzopoulos, M. B. (1996). Macedonian Institutions Under the Kings: a Historical and Epigraphic Study. Vol. 1. Athens: Research Centre for Greek and Roman Antiquity, National Hellenic Research Foundation; Diffusion de Boccard. ISBN 960-7094-90-5.
- Kremydi-Sicilianou, Sophia (2005). "'Belonging' to Rome, 'Remaining' Greek: Coinage and Identity in Roman Macedonia". In Howgego, C.; Heuchert, V.; Burnett, A. (eds.). Coinage and identity in the Roman Provinces. Oxford University Press. pp. 95–106. ISBN 978-0-19-926526-8.
- Mikulčić, Ivan (2002). Spätantike und frühbyzantinische Befestigungen in Nordmakedonien. Städte – Vici – Refugien – Kastelle [Late Antique and Early Byzantine Fortifications in North Macedonia. Towns – Vici – Refuges – Castles]. Munich: Beck. ISBN 3-406-10753-2.
- Papazoglou, F. (1979). "Quelques aspects de l'histoire de la province de Macédoine". ANRW. ii.7.1: 302–369.
- Papazoglou, F. (1988). Les villes de Macédoine à l'époque romaine. Paris: École Française d'Athènes. ISBN 2-86958-014-2.
- Papazoglou, F. (1998). "Le koinon Macédonien et la province de Macédoine". Thracia. 12: 133–9.
- O'Sullivan, Firmin (1972). The Egnatian Way. Newton Abbot: David and Charles. ISBN 9780715356760.
- Vanderspoel, John (2010). "Provincia Macedonia". In Roisman, Joseph; Worthington, Ian (eds.). A companion to ancient Macedonia. Chichester, West Sussex, U.K.: Blackwell Publishing. pp. 251–275. ISBN 978-1-405-17936-2.
