= Mamilian commission =

The Mamilian commission (also called the quaestio Mamilia) was established by Gaius Mamilius probably in December 110 BC for the investigation of corrupt dealings between senators and the Numidian king Jugurtha. According to Sallust, this was primarily allegations of senators taking bribes to push pro-Jugurthine foreign policy. This pro-Jugurthine senatorial policy, however, may not necessarily have come from corruption: it may have come also from good relations between influential senators and Jugurtha developed during joint service in the Numantine War from 134 and 132 BC. Unlike in the traditional iudicia populi, any citizen could bring a charge and prosecute. The jury pool for the commission, depending on the reading of Gracchani iudices, has traditionally been interpreted as being the equestrians. One of the three court presidents was probably Marcus Scaurus, the princeps senatus at the time.

Most of what is known of the commission's activities comes from passages of Cicero's Brutus, which relates that the priest Gaius Galba and four men of consular rank (Lucius Bestia, Gaius Cato, Spurius Albinus, and Lucius Opimius) were exiled. The charges related to the accepting of bribes from the Numidian monarch Jugurtha for political favours and influence at Rome. That Rome's lethargic Numidian policy, alleged to have been secured by corruption, had been led by the clique who had killed or betrayed the Gracchi brothers may also have given impetus to the charges. The four consulars convicted were all enemies of the Gracchi and the equestrian juries of the Mamilian commission may convicted out of spite.

In 106, the commission would have its independence significantly eroded in a bill introduced by Quintus Servilius Caepio, which changed the jury pool from solely the equestrians to a mix of equestrians and senators.

The conviction of the priest Gaius Galba may have cut short his political career, creating an opening for Gaius Marius, a candidate in 108 for the consulship of 107 BC, the novus homo from Arpinum to win. The structure of the Mamilian commission influenced that which was established in 104 BC to prosecute Quintus Servilius Caepio for the theft of the gold of Tolosa and the defeat at Battle of Arausio. One of the long-term consequences of the commission – trending into Marius' repeated consulships – was to inculcate a general feeling that the existing senatorial leadership (the nobiles) were failing in their responsibility to look after the state and defeat Rome's enemies.

== Bibliography ==
- Bates, Richard L (1986). ""Rex in senatu": a political biography of M Aemilius Scaurus". Proceedings of the American Philosophical Society. 130 (3): 251–288. ISSN 0003-049X. JSTOR 986827.
- Beness, Jillian Lea (September 1989). The tribunate from Saturninus to Sulla, 103–88 BC (PDF) (PhD thesis). University of New England.
- Duncan, Mike (2017). Storm before the storm (1st ed.). New York: Hachette Book Group. ISBN 978-1-61039-721-6.
- Farney, Gary D. (1997). "The fall of the priest C. Sulpicius Galba and the first consulship of Marius". Memoirs of the American Academy in Rome. 42: 23–37. doi:10.2307/4238746. ISSN 0065-6801. JSTOR 4238746.
- Flower, Harriet I (2010). Roman republics. Princeton: Princeton University Press. ISBN 978-0-691-14043-8. OCLC 301798480.
- Sumner, G V (1976). "Scaurus and the Mamilian inquisition". Phoenix. 30 (1): 73–75. doi:10.2307/1088024. ISSN 0031-8299. JSTOR 1088024.
