= Via Caecilia =

Ancient highroad in Italy

Via Caecilia, an ancient highroad of Italy, which diverged from the Via Salaria at the 35th mile (56 km) from Rome, and ran by Amiternum to the Adriatic coast, passing probably by Hadria (Atri). A branch ran to Interamna Praetuttiorum (Teramo) and thence probably to the sea at Castrum Novum (Giulianova), a distance of about 151 miles (243 km) from Rome. It was probably constructed by Lucius Caecilius Metellus Diadematus (consul in 117 BC, censor 115).
