= Gaius Caecilius Metellus =

Roman senator in the late 80s BC

Gaius Metellus was a young Roman senator at the time of Sulla's proscriptions in the late 80s BC. Given that his cognomen is Metellus, his gens name is likely to have been Caecilius. Nothing about his identity can be established with certainty.

Plutarch records what seems to have been a famous anecdote about Gaius Metellus as the one who prompted the Roman dictator to post the first proscription lists:

Sulla now devoted himself to butchery, and the city was filled with murders without number or limit, with many people being killed out of private enmity, with whom Sulla had no concerns but permitted it as a favour to his supporters, until one of the young men, Gaius Metellus, ventured in the Roman Senate to ask Sulla what end there would be to these evils. … Sulla replied that he did not know yet whom he would spare, and Metellus answered, 'Then tell us whom you intend to punish'. Sulla said that he would do this.

Plutarch notes, however, that "some say" that it was actually Fufidius, one of Sulla's henchmen, who raised this question.
