= Divinatio in Caecilium =

Oration by Cicero

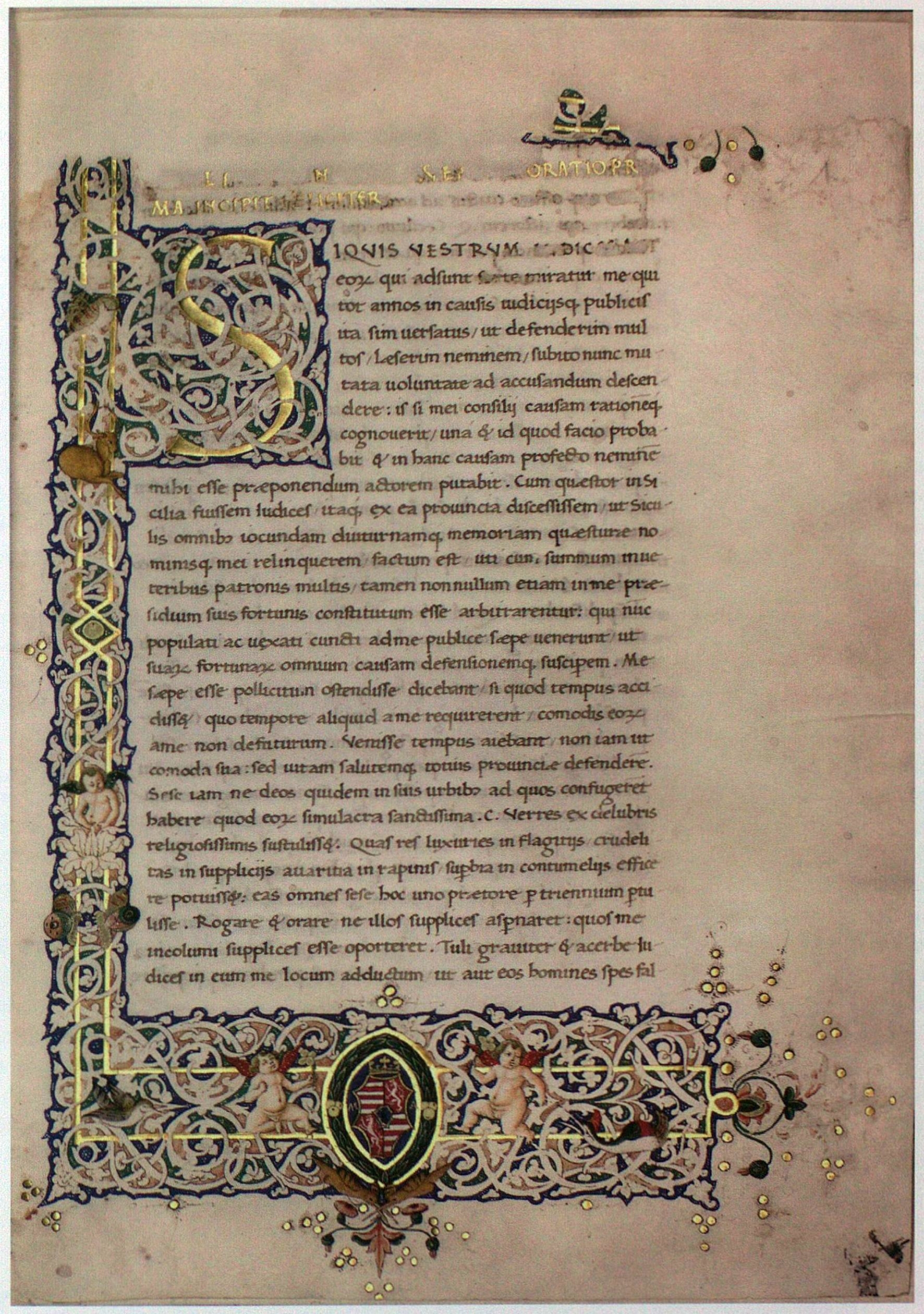
Divinatio in Caecilium, 15th century manuscript, Budapest

Cicero's Divinatio in Caecilium is his oration against Quintus Caecilius in the process for selecting a prosecutor of Gaius Verres (70 BC). Cicero asserts that he, rather than Q. Caecilius, will make the better prosecutor of Verres, the Roman magistrate notorious for his misgovernment of Sicily. It is the only surviving text of a rhetorical genre, the divinatio ("prophecy"), that has survived.

The advocate for Verres, against whom the chosen orator must bend his rhetorical skills, was Quintus Hortensius Hortalus, the ally of the optimates and principal orator of the day.
