= Marcus Caecilius Metellus (praetor 206 BC) =

Roman senator

Marcus Caecilius Metellus was a Roman politician who served as plebeian aedile in 208 BC and as praetor urbanus in 206 BC. He was the son of Lucius Caecilius Metellus and the brother of Quintus Caecilius Metellus and Lucius Caecilius Metellus. While serving as plebeian aedile alongside Gaius Servilius Geminus, he oversaw the repetition of the Plebeian Games for two days, donated three statues to the Temple of Ceres, and held banquet for Jupiter during the festivities. He was elected praetor in 206 BC, the same year that his brother, Quintus, was consul, and given jurisdiction over the city. In 205 BC, he served as an ambassador to Attalus I, the king of Pergamon.
