= Gaius Mamilius Limetanus =

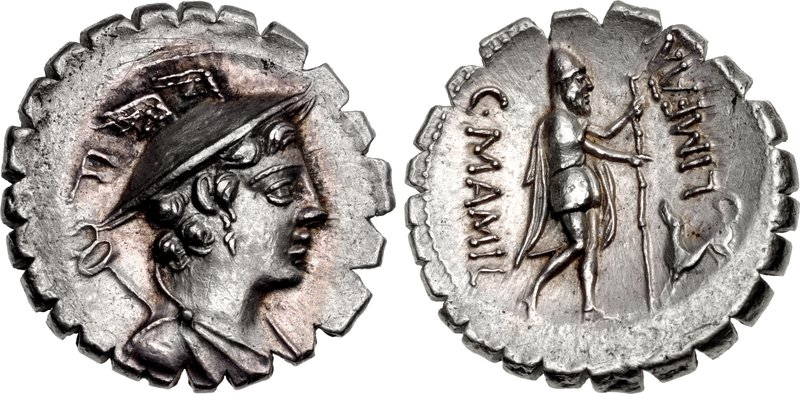
Denarius issued in 82 BC by a son of the same name, with the depiction of Mercury and Ulysses walking with faithful Argus the dog alluding to the family's mythology of descent from Telegonus, a son of Ulysses and Circe

Gaius Mamilius Limetanus was Roman Republican politician who served as one of the plebeian tribunes for 109 BC.

Limetanus established a court, the Mamilian commission, to prosecute those who abetted the Numidian king Jugurtha and had taken bribes from him. The court convicted five men and sent them into exile.

He also may have passed a law regulating the use of agricultural land. In 91 BC , he may have served as one of the decemviri agris dandis assignandis, a ten-man commission for implementing the land grants following Marcus Livius Drusus' agricultural laws.

== Bibliography ==
- Broughton, Thomas Robert Shannon (1951). The magistrates of the Roman republic. Vol. 1. New York: American Philological Association.
- Broughton, Thomas Robert Shannon (1952). The magistrates of the Roman republic. Vol. 2. New York: American Philological Association.
- Evans, Jane DeRose (1992). The Art of Persuasion: Political Propaganda from Aeneas to Brutus. University of Michigan Press.
