= Robert Knapp (classicist) =

American professor of classics

Robert C. Knapp (February 12, 1946–September 17, 2023) was an author, historian, and professor of Classics at the University of California, Berkeley.

== Early life ==
Raised in Mt. Pleasant, Michigan, Knapp earned his B.A degree from Central Michigan University in 1968, majoring in history and Spanish. In 1973 he completed his PhD in ancient history at the University of Pennsylvania. His dissertation, under Robert E. A. Palmer, was on the Roman experience in the Spanish peninsula, 218-100 B.C.

== Career ==
Knapp worked for a short time in the classics department at Colby College and in the history department at the University of Utah. After that, he went to the classics department at the University of California, Berkeley, in 1974. He remained there until his retirement in 2006, eventually attaining the rank of professor. Besides teaching and doing research, he served in numerous administrative posts including as chairman of the classics department and the Department of East Asian Languages and Cultures, as dean in the College of Letters and Science, and chairman of the Berkeley faculty Senate.

== Selected publications ==
- Aspects of the Roman Experience in Iberia, 206-100 B.C. 1980
- Roman Córdoba. 2011.
- Latin Inscriptions from Central Spain. 1992.
- Finis Rei Publicae: Eyewitnesses to the End of the Roman Republic. 1999. (with Pamela Vaughn)
- Barrington Atlas of the Greek and Roman World. 2000. (editor for Iberia)
- Nemea III: The Coins. 2004. (with John Mac Isaac)
- Invisible Romans Profile, 2011.
- Clare 1865-1940. 2012.
- Mystery Man. Gangsters, Oil, and Murder in Michigan. 2013.
- The Dawn of Christianity People and Gods in a Time of Magic and Miracles. Harvard University Press, 2017. ISBN 9780674976467
