= Lucius Caecilius Metellus Diadematus =

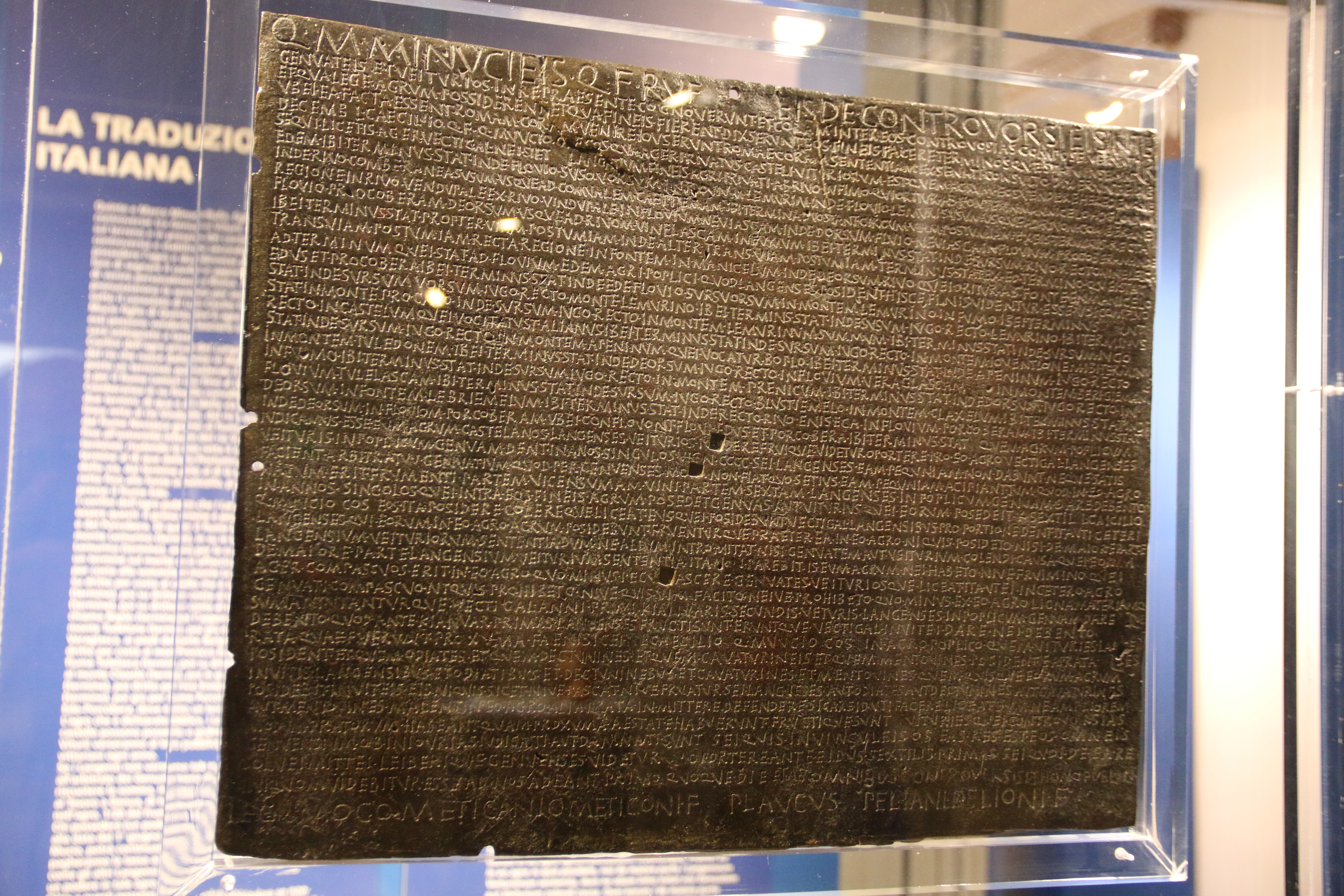
- Sententia Minuciorum CIL I, 584, dated 117 BC

Roman consul

Lucius Caecilius Metellus Diadematus (Note: Cognomen derived from at some point having used a bandage to cover a wound on his head. (Cfr. F. Noel, in Dictionnaire Historique ...)) was the second son of Roman politician and general Quintus Caecilius Metellus Macedonicus.

During his consulship in 117 BC he supported the development of roads in Italy and he probably built Via Caecilia. A year later he was Proconsul of Cisalpine Gaul. In 115 BC Diadematus was elected Censor and during his censorship with Gnaeus Domitius Ahenobarbus they expelled 32 senators from the Senate.

He was an opponent of Lucius Appuleius Saturninus and was arrested in 100 BC with Saturninus and other senators when Saturninus tried to forcefully oppose the Senate.

He lived to see the return of his first cousin, Quintus Caecilius Metellus Numidicus, from exile, and exerted himself to obtain his recall.

He is attested as consul, together with his colleague, Quintus Mucius Scaevola Augur, on the sententia Minuciorum, a legal document describing arbitration by Roman officials.

== See also ==
- Caecilia gens

== Notes ==
Political offices
Preceded by Marcus Porcius Cato; Quintus Marcius Rex	Roman consul 117 BC; With: Quintus Mucius Scaevola Augur	Succeeded by Gaius Licinius Geta; Q. Fabius Maximus Eburnus
