= Gaius Servilius Vatia =

2nd-century BCE Roman politician

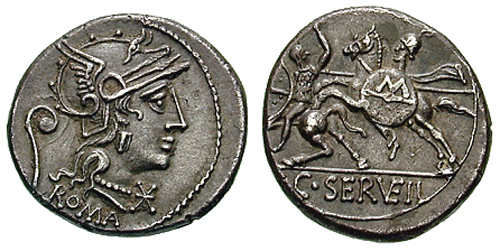
Denarius of Gaius Servilius Vatia, 127 BC. The obverse depicts a head of Roma; the lituus behind her head refers to Pulex Geminus' augurate in 211 BC. The reverse depicts Marcus Servilius Pulex Geminus, identified by the 'M' on his shield.

Gaius Servilius Vatia was a politician of the Roman Republic in the second half of the 2nd century BC.

Vatia belonged to the gens Servilia, which was initially patrician, but went over to the plebeians during the Second Punic War. He was probably the son of Marcus Servilius, a pontifex in 170 and the grandson of Marcus Servilius Pulex Geminus, consul in 202, famous for his victories in single combat. He married Caecilia, a daughter of Quintus Caecilius Metellus Macedonicus, who was one of the most important politicians of the time after his victory during the Fourth Macedonian War in 148 BC.

Vatia was triumvir monetalis in 127. He minted denarii depicting one of the duels of his grandfather Pulex Geminus.

He then served in the Greek East as praetor or propraetor, probably in Macedonia, because he was honoured with a statue in Olympia by the city of Elis.

Vatia had three sons. The elder son Gaius was praetor in 102, while the second one Marcus was likewise moneyer in 100. His third son Publius was by far the most famous. He reached the consulship in 79 BC, then held a long command in Cilicia in order to fight the pirates. He received a triumph and the agnomen Isauricus thanks to his victory there.

== Bibliography ==
- T. Robert S. Broughton, The Magistrates of the Roman Republic, American Philological Association, 1951–1952.
- Michael Crawford, Roman Republican Coinage, Cambridge University Press, 1974.
- Friedrich Münzer, Roman Aristocratic Parties and Families, translated by Thérèse Ridley, Johns Hopkins University Press, 1999 (originally published in 1920).
- August Pauly, Georg Wissowa, Friedrich Münzer, et alii, Realencyclopädie der Classischen Altertumswissenschaft (abbreviated RE), J. B. Metzler, Stuttgart, 1894–1980.
