= Marcus Porcius Cato (consul 118 BC) =

Roman consul and orator (died 118 BC)

Marcus Porcius Cato (died 118 BC) was a member of the Roman plebeian gens Porcii and consul in 118 BC.

Marcus Porcius Cato was the elder son of Marcus Porcius Cato Licinianus and the grandson of the famous conservative Roman politician Cato the Elder. Nothing is known about his early life. In 121 BC at the latest he was praetor. In 118 BC he became consul; his colleague was Quintus Marcius Rex. He went to Africa, perhaps to settle the dispute between the heirs of king Micipsa of Numidia, the son of Masinissa, but Cato died during his consulate.

Cato was a powerful orator. He left some posthumous speeches, which were preserved for some time.
