= List of Roman praetors =

The following is a list of Roman praetors as reported by ancient sources.

A praetor in ancient Rome was a person who held an annual office below the level of a consul but who still received a grant of imperium, allowing him to command armed forces. Two praetors each year had specific duties in Rome: the praetor urbanus (who presided in civil cases between citizens) and the praetor peregrinus (who administered justice among foreigners). Unless otherwise noted all dates are reported in BC.

== List of praetors of the Roman Republic ==
The following individuals held the position of Praetor during the Roman Republic, starting with the creation of the office in 366 BC.

=== 4th century BC ===
Date (BC)	Name
366	Spurius Furius (M. f. L. n.) Camillus
350	Publius Valerius (P. f. L. n.) Poplicola
349	Lucius Pinarius (Natta?)
347?	Marcus Valerius M. f. M. n. Maximus Corvus
341	Titus(?) Aemilius Mamercinus
340	Lucius Papirius L. f. L. n. Crassus
336	Quintus Publilius Philo
332	Lucius Papirius (L. f. L. n. Crassus?)
322	Lucius Plautius L. f. L. n. Venno
318	Lucius Furius
308	Marcus Valerius M. f. M. n. Maximus Corvus

=== 3rd century BC ===
Date (BC)	Name
297?	Appius Claudius (C. f. Ap. n. Caecus)
296	Publius Sempronius (Sophus)
295	Appius Claudius (C. f. Ap. n. Caecus)
293	Marcus Atilius (M. f. M. n. Regulus)
292	Lucius Papirius L. f. Sp. n. Cursor
283	Lucius Caecilius (Metellus Denter)
280?	Quintus Marcius Philippus
257	Aulus Atilius A. f. C. n. Caiatinus
253	Lucius Postumius Megellus
242	Quintus Valerius Falto
234	Publius Cornelius
233?	Lucius Postumius A. f. A. n. Albinus
227	Gaius Flaminius
227	Marcus Valerius (Laevinus?)
224?	Marcus Claudius Marcellus
224?	Publius Furius Philus
219?	Lucius Furius Bibaculus
218	Marcus Aemilius Lepidus
218	Gaius Atilius Serranus
218?	Lucius Manlius Vulso
218	Gaius Terentius Varro
217	Marcus Aemilius (Regulus?)
217	Aulus Cornelius Mammula
217	Titus Otacilius Crassus
217	Marcus Pomponius (Matho?)
216	Marcus Claudius Marcellus
216	Publius Furius Philus
216	Marcus Pomponius Matho
216	Lucius Postumius Albinus
216?	Marcus Aemilius Lepidus
215	Appius Claudius Pulcher
215	Quintus Fulvius Flaccus
215	Quintus Mucius Scaevola
215	Marcus Valerius Laevinus
214	Publius Cornelius Lentulus
214	Quintus Fabius Maximus
214	Quintus Fulvius Flaccus
214	Titus Otacilius Crassus
213	Marcus Aemilius (Lepidus?)
213	Marcus Atilius (Regulus?)
213	Gnaeus Fulvius Centumalus
213	Publius Sempronius Tuditanus
212	Gaius Claudius Nero
212	Publius Cornelius Sulla
212	Gnaeus Fulvius Flaccus
212	Marcus Iunius Silanus
211	Gaius Calpurnius Piso
211	Marcus Cornelius Cethegus
211	Lucius Cornelius (Lentulus)
211	Gaius Sulpicius
210	Lucius Cincius Alimentus
210	Gaius Laetorius
210	Lucius Manlius Acidinus
210	Publius Manlius Vulso
209	Gaius Aurunculeius
209	Gaius Hostilius Tubulus
209	Titus Quinctius Crispinus
209	Lucius Veturius Philo
208	Quintus Claudius (Flamen?)
208	Sextus Iulius Caesar
208	Publius Licinius Crassus Dives
208	Publius Licinius Varus
207	Aulus Hostilius Cato
207	Gaius Hostilius Cato
207	Gaius Mamilius Vitulus
207	Lucius Porcius Licinus
206	Marcus Caecilius Metellus
206	Tiberius Claudius Asellus
206	Quintus Mamilius Turrinus
206	Gaius Servilius (Geminus)
205	Lucius Aemilius Papus
205	Spurius Lucretius
205	Gnaeus Octavius
205	Gnaeus Servilius Caepio
204	Tiberius Claudius Nero
204	Marcus Marcius Ralla
204	Marcus Pomponius Matho
204	Lucius Scribonius Libo
203	Publius Aelius Paetus
203	Publius Cornelius Lentulus (Caudinus)
203	Publius Quinctilius Varus
203	Publius Villius Tappulus
202	Gaius Aurelius Cotta
202	Gaius Livius Salinator
202	Marcus Sextius Sabinus
202	Gnaeus Tremellius Flaccus
201	Publius Aelius Tubero
201	Marcus Fabius Buteo
201	Marcus Junius Pennus
201	Marcus Valerius Falto

=== 2nd century BC ===
Date (BC)	Names						
200	Quintus Fulvius Gillo	Lucius Furius Purpurio	Quintus Minucius Rufus	Gaius Sergius Plautus			
199	Gnaeus Baebius Tamphilus	Lucius Quinctius Flamininus	Lucius Valerius Flaccus	Lucius Villius Tappulus			
198	Marcus Claudius Marcellus	Lucius Cornelius Merula	Gaius Helvius	Marcus Porcius Cato			
197	Lucius Atilius	Marcus Helvius	Lucius Manlius Vulso	Marcus Minucius Rufus	Gaius Sempronius Tuditanus	Marcus Sergius Silus	
196	Manius Acilius Glabrio	Lucius Apustius Fullo	Quintus Fabius Buteo	Gaius Laelius	Quintus Minucius Thermus	Tiberius Sempronius Longus	
195	Gaius Atinius Labeo	Appius Claudius Nero	Gaius Fabricius Luscinus	Gnaeus Manlius Vulso	Publius Manlius (Vulso?)	Publius Porcius Laeca	
194	Gnaeus Cornelius Blasio	Gnaeus Cornelius Merenda	Publius Cornelius Scipio Nasica	Sextus Digitius	Gnaeus Domitius Ahenobarbus	Titus Iuventius Thalna	
193	Lucius Cornelius Scipio (Asiaticus)	Gaius Flaminius	Marcus Fulvius Nobilior	Lucius Porcius Licinus	Gaius Scribonius (Curio)	Lucius Valerius Messalla	
192	Aulus Atilius Serranus	Marcus Baebius Tamphilus	Marcus Fulvius Centumalus	Quintus Salonius Sarra	Lucius Scribonius Libo	Lucius Valerius Tappo	
191	Marcus Aemilius Lepidus	Lucius Aemilius Paullus (Macedonicus)	Aulus Cornelius Mammula	Marcus Iunius Brutus	Gaius Livius Salinator	Lucius Oppius Salinator	
190	Lucius Aemilius Regulus	Gaius Atinius Labeo	Lucius Aurunculeius	Gnaeus Fulvius	Publius Iunius Brutus	Marcus Tuccius	
189	Lucius Baebius Dives	Quintus Fabius Labeo	Quintus Fabius Pictor	Lucius Plautius Hypsaeus	Spurius Postumius Albinus	Marcus Sempronius Tuditanus	? Aulus Manlius Vulso (suff.)
188	Gaius Atinius	Marcus Claudius Marcellus	Appius Claudius Pulcher	Lucius Manlius Acidinus Fulvianus	Quintus Marcius Philippus	Gaius Stertinius	
187	Publius Claudius Pulcher	Quintus Fulvius Flaccus	Marcus Furius Crassipes	Servius Sulpicius Galba	Quintus Terentius Culleo	Lucius Terentius Massaliota	
186	Gaius Aurelius Scaurus	Gaius Calpurnius Piso	Publius Cornelius Sulla	Marcus Licinius Lucullus	Titus Maenius	Lucius Quinctius Crispinus	
185	Gaius Afranius Stellio	Gaius Atilius Serranus	Marcus Claudius Marcellus	Publius Cornelius Cethegus	Aulus Postumius Albinus Luscus	Lucius Postumius Tempsanus	
184	Publius Cornelius Cethegus	Gaius Decimius Flavus	Quintus Naevius Matho	Gaius Sempronius Blaesus	Publius Sempronius Longus	Aulus Terentius Varro	
183	Publius Cornelius Sisenna	Lucius Julius (Caesar?)	Spurius Postumius Albinus	Lucius Pupius	Gnaeus Sicinius	Gaius Valerius Flaccus	
182	Lucius Caecilius Denter	Quintus Fulvius Flaccus	Publius Manlius (Vulso?)	Marcus Ogulnius Gallus	Gaius Terentius Istra	Marcus Valerius Laevinus	
181	Tiberius Claudius Nero	Lucius Duronius	Quintus Fabius Buteo	Quintus Fabius Maximus	Quintus Petilius Spurinus	Marcus Pinarius Rusca	
180	Publius Cornelius Mammula	Aulus Hostilius Mancinus	Gaius Maenius	Tiberius Minucius Molliculus	Lucius Postumius Albinus	Tiberius Sempronius Gracchus	Gaius Claudius Pulcher
179	Gnaeus Cornelius Scipio Hispallus	Publius Mucius Scaevola	Quintus Mucius Scaevola	Gaius Valerius Laevinus			
178	Titus Aebutius Parrus	Tiberius Claudius Nero	Titus Fonteius Capito	Marcus Titinius Curvus	Marcus Titinius	?Gaius Cluvius Saxula	
177	Publius Aelius Tubero	Lucius Mummius	Gaius Numisius	Gaius Quinctius Flamininus	Gnaeus Cornelius Scipio	Gaius Valerius Laevinus	
176	Marcus Aburius	Lucius Aquillius Gallus	Marcus Cornelius Scipio Maluginensis	Publius Licinius Crassus	Lucius Papirius Maso	Marcus Popilius Laenas	
175	Publius Aelius Ligus	Appius Claudius Centho	Gaius Popilius Laenas	? Quintus Baebius Sulca	? Servius Cornelius Sulla	? Gnaeus Lutatius Cerco	
174	Marcus Atilius Serranus	Gaius Cassius Longinus	Lucius Claudius	Lucius Cornelius Scipio	Publius Furius Philus	Gnaeus Servilius Caepio	
173	Aulus Atilius Serranus	Gaius Cicereius	Gaius Cluvius Saxula	Numerius Fabius Buteo	Marcus Furius Crassipes	Marcus Matienus	
172	Spurius Cluvius	Marcus Iunius Pennus	Gaius Licinius Crassus	Spurius Lucretius	Gaius Memmius	Gnaeus Sicinius	
171	Gaius Caninius Rebilus	Lucius Canuleius Dives	Lucius Furius Philus	Gaius Lucretius Gallus	Gaius Sulpicius Galba	Lucius Villius Annalis	
170	Quintus Aelius Paetus	? Gnaeus Domitius Ahenobarbus	Lucius Hortensius	Quintus Maenius	? Titus Manlius Torquatus	Marcus Raecius	? Gaius Tremellius
169	Marcus Claudius Marcellus	Servius Cornelius Lentulus	Gaius Decimius	Publius Fonteius Capito	Gaius Marcius Figulus	Gaius Sulpicius Gallus	
168	Marcus Aebutius Helva	Lucius Anicius Gallus	Gnaeus Baebius Tamphilus	Publius Fonteius Balbus	Gnaeus Octavius	Gaius Papirius Carbo	
167	Quintus Cassius Longinus	Tiberius Claudius Nero	Gnaeus Fulvius	Manius Iuventius Thalna	Gaius Licinius Nerva	Aulus Manlius Torquatus	
166	Lucius Appuleius Saturninus	Marcus Fonteius	Lucius Julius Caesar	Aulus Licinius Nerva	Publius Quinctilius Varus	Publius Rutilius Calvus	
165	Publius Cornelius Blasio?	Publius Cornelius Lentulus	Publius Cornelius Scipio Nasica Corculum				
164	Quintus Minucius?	Marcus Valerius Messalla?	Gaius Fannius Strabo?				
163	Marcus Cornelius Cathegus?						
162	Gnaeus Cornelius Dolabella?	Marcus Fulvius Nobilior?					
161	Marcus Aemilius Lepidus?	Marcus Pomponius					
160	Lucius Aurelius Orestes?	Sextus Iulius Caesar?					
159	Lucius Cornelius Cn. f. L. n. Lentulus Lupus	Gnaeus Tremellius					
157	Manius Acilius Glabrio?	Quintus Opimius?	Lucius Postumius Albinus?				
156	Titus Annius Luscus?	Quintus Fulvius Nobilior?					
155	Manius Manilius?	Aulus Postumius Albinus	Lucius Valerius Flaccus?				
154	Lucius Calpurnius Piso Caesoninus	Lucius Licinius Lucullus					
153	Manius Acilius Balbus?	Titus Quinctius Flamininus?	Lucius Mummius				
152	Marcus Atilius Serranus	Lucius Marcius Censorinus?					
151	Spurius Postumius Albinus Magnus?	Servius Sulpicius Galba					
150	Gaius Livius M. Aemiliani f. M. n. Drusus?						
149	Quintus Fabius Maximus Aemilianus	Gnaeus Cornelius Lentulus?	Publius Iuventius Thalna	Lucius Hostilius Mancinus?			
148	Quintus Caecilius Metellus Macedonicus						
147	Lucius Aurelius Cotta?	Lucius Licinius Murena?	Gaius Sempronius Tuditanus?	Gaius Vetilius			
146	Appius Claudius Pulcher?	? Claudius Unimanus	? Oppius?	Gaius Plautius Hypsaeus			
145	Lucius Caecilius Metellus Calvus?	Quintus Fabius Maximus Servilianus?	Gaius Laelius Sapiens	Gaius Nigidius?			
144	Quintus Marcius Rex	Quintus Pompeius?	Gnaeus Servilius Caepio?				
143	Marcus Aemilius Lepidus Porcina?	Aulus Licinius Nerva	? Quinctius ?	Quintus Servilius Cn. f. Cn. n. Caepio?			
142	Gnaeus Calpurnius Piso?	Lucius Hostilius Tubulus	Marcus Popillius Laenas?				
141	Publius Cornelius Scipio Nasica Serapio?	Decimus Iunius Brutus Callaicus?	Decimus Iunius Silanus Manlianus?				
140	Lucius Cornelius Lentulus?	Gaius Hostilius Mancinus?	Marcus Iunius Brutus?				
139	Sextus Atilius Serranus?	Gnaeus Cornelius Scipio Hispanus	Lucius Furius Philus?	Lucius Plautius Hypsaeus?			
138	Quintus Calpurnius Piso?	Lucius Calpurnius Piso Frugi?	Servius Fulvius Flaccus?				
137	Marcus Claudius Marcellus	? Cornelius Lentulus?	Gaius Fulvius Flaccus?				
136	Manlius	Publius Mucius Scaevola	Lucius Tremellius Scrofa?				
135	Marcus Cosconius	Publius Popillius Laenas?	Publius Rupilius?				
134	Publius Licinius Dives Crassus Mucianus?	Lucius Valerius Flaccus					
133	Appius Claudius?	Marcus Perperna?	Lucius Rupilius?	Gaius Popillius C. f.			
132	Gaius Sempronius Tuditanus	Manius Aquillius?					
131	Titus Annius Rufus?	Gnaeus Octavius?					
130	Lucius Cassius Longinus Ravilla?	Lucius Cornelius Cinna?	Gaius Marcius Figulus?				
129	Marcus Aemilius Lepidus?	Lucius Aurelius Orestes?	Tiberius (Latinius?) Pandusa?				
128	Publius Cornelius P. f. Lentulus?	Marcus Fulvius Flaccus?	Marcus Plautius Hypsaeus?				
127	Gaius Cassius Longinus?	Gaius Sextius Calvinus?					
126	Quintus Caecilius Metellus Balearicus?	Titus Quinctius Flamininus?	Gaius Fannius M. f.?	Marcus Licinius Crassus Agelastus?			
125	Gnaeus Domitius Ahenobarbus?	Lucius Opimius	Aebutius?				
124	Quintus Fabius Maximus Allobrogicus?						
123	Sextus Iulius Caesar	Publius Manilius?	Gaius Papirius Carbo?				
122	Lucius Aurelius Cotta?	Lucius Caecilius Metellus Dalmaticus?					
121	Quintus Marcius Rex?	Marcus Porcius Cato?	Gaius Scribonius Curio				
120	Lucius Caecilius Metellus Diadematus?	Quintus Mucius Scaevola Augur?					
119	Marcus Aemilius Scaurus?	Gnaeus Cornelius Sisenna?	Quintus Fabius Maximus Eburnus	Gaius Licinius Geta?	Sextus Pompeius?		
118	Marcus Caecilius Metellus?	Publius Rutilius Rufus?					
117	Marcus Acilius Balbus?	Gaius Caecilius Metellus Caprarius?	Gaius Porcius Cato?				
116	Gnaeus Papirius Carbo?						
115	Lucius Calpurnius Piso Caesoninus?	Publius Decius	Marcus Livius Drusus?	Gaius Marius?			
114	Lucius Calpurnius Bestia?	Publius Cornelius Scipio Nasica?	Marcus Papirius Carbo?				
113	Marcus Iunius Silanus?	Lucius Memmius?	Marcus Minucius Rufus?	Spurius Postumius Albinus?			
112	Quintus Caecilius Metellus Numidicus?	Lucius Calpurnius Piso Frugi?	Marcius Iunius Silanus?				
111	Marcus Aemilius Scaurus?	Lucius Cassius Longinus	Lucius (or Quintus) Hortensius?	Servius Sulpicius Galba?			
109	Gaius Atilius Serranus?	Quintus Lutatius Catulus?	Quintus Servilius Caepio	Gnaeus Cornelius Scipio?			
108	Gnaeus Mallius Maximus						
107	Gnaeus Aufidius	Gaius Billienus?	Gaius Flavius Fimbria?				
106	Lucius Aurelius Orestes?						
105	Titus Albucius?	Lucius (Annius?) Bellienus	Lucius ...onius				
104	Manius Aquillius?	Titus Flaminius?	Lucius Licinius Lucullus	Publius Licinius Nerva?	Gaius Memmius?		
103	Glaucia?	Lucius Valerius Flaccus?	Vibius?				
102	Marcus Antonius	Marcus Marius?	Aulus Postumius Albinus?	Gaius Servilius			
101	Quintus Caecilius Metellus Nepos?	Titus Didius?	Lucius Licinius L. f. Murena?				

=== 1st century BC ===
Date (BC)	Names								
100	Lucius Cornelius P. f. L. n. Dolabella?	Gnaeus Cornelius Lentulus?	Publius Licinius Crassus?	Gaius Servilius Glaucia	Tremellius?				
99	Gaius Cassius Longinus?	Gaius Coelius Caldus?	Gnaeus Domitius Ahenobarbus?						
98	Lucius Licinius Crassus?	Quintus Mucius Scaevola?							
97	Lucius Domitius Ahenobarbus?	Marcus Herennius?							
96	Lucius Marcius Philippus?	Lucius (Sempronius) Asellio?	Gaius Valerius Flaccus?						
95	Lucius Aurelius Cotta?	Gaius Claudius Pulcher	Lucius Julius Caesar	Marcus Perperna?					
94	Lucius Gellius Poplicola	Sextus Julius Caesar?	Gaius Sentius						
93	Publius Cornelius Scipio Nasica?	Lucius Cornelius Sulla (Felix)	Publius Rutilius Lupus?	Lucius Valerius Flaccus?					
92	Gaius Julius Caesar?	Gnaeus Pompeius Strabo?	Lucius Porcius Cato?	Marcus Porcius Cato?	Gaius Sextius Calvinus?				
91	Lucius Lucilius L. f.?	Gnaeus Octavius (Ruso?)?	Gaius Perperna?	Quintus Pompeius Rufus	Quintus Servilius	Quintus Servilius Caepio?	Servius Sulpicius Galba?		
90	Gaius Caelius?	M. (Caecilius) Cornutus?	Gaius Cassius?	Lucius Cornelius Cinna?	Lucius Cornelius Merula?	Gnaeus Octavius?	Lucius Postumius	Publius Servilius Vatia (Isauricus)?	
89	Quintus Caecilius Metellus Pius	Appius Claudius Pulcher	Gaius Cosconius?	Publius Gabinius	Quintus Oppius?	(Gnaeus Papirius?) Carbo?	Aulus Sempronius Asellio	Publius Sextilius?	
88	Quintus Ancharius?	Marcus Iunius Brutus	Lucius Licinius Murena?	Gaius Norbanus?	?Servilius?	Publius Sextilius?			
86	Lucius Cornelius Scipio Asiagenus (Asiaticus)?								
85	Marcus Marius Gratidianus?								
84	Marcus Marius Gratidianus?	Gaius Fabius Hadrianus							
83	Publius? Burrienus	Gaius Papirius Carbo (Arvina)?	Quintus Sertorius						
82	Lucius Iunius Brutus Damasippus	Quintus Antonius Balbus	Gaius Carrinus	? Magius	Marcus Perperna (Vento)				
81	Gnaeus Cornelius Dolabella	Mamercus Aemilius Lepidus Livianus ?	Marcus Aemelius Lepidus ?	Gaius Claudius P. f. Nero ?	Lucius Fufidius ?	Quintus Lutatius Catulus ?	Marcus Minucius Thermus	Sextus Nonius Sufenas	Gaius Papirius Carbo ?
80	Gaius Claudius Marcellus	Marcus Domitius Calvinus	Marcus Fannius	Decimus Iunius Brutus ?	Gaius Scribonius Curio ?				
44	Marcus Junius Brutus	Gaius Cassius Longinus	Lucius Cornelius Cinna	Gaius Antonius	Titus Annius Cimber	Marcus Piso	Quintus Cassius	Gaius Cestius	Marcus Cunisius
32	Marcus Valerius Messalla Potitus?								

== Bibliography ==
- Broughton, T. Robert S., Magistrates of the Roman Republic, American Philological Association (1952–1986), Volumes 1, 2, and Supplemental.
- Titus Livius Patavinus (Livy), Ab Urbe Condita (History of Rome).
- Polybius, Ἱστορίαι (Histories).
- Valerius Maximus, Factorum ac dictorum memorabilium libri IX ("Nine books of memorable deeds and sayings".
- Joannes Zonaras, Ἐπιτομὴ Ἱστοριῶν (Extracts of History).
