= Cincia gens =

Plebeian family at Rome

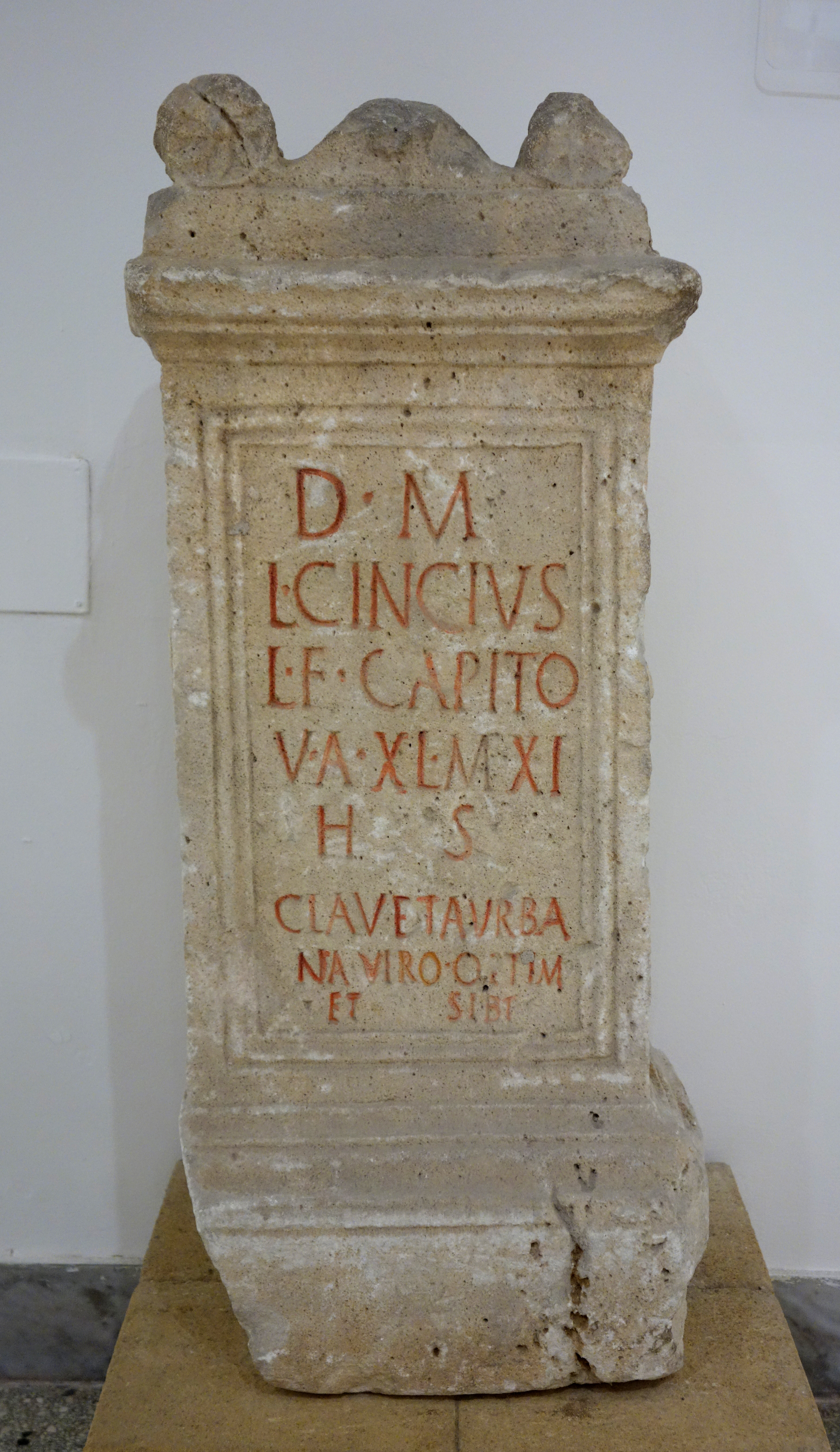
Funerary altar of Lucius Cincius Capito, Brundisium, 1st–2nd century

The gens Cincia was a minor plebeian family of ancient Rome. The first member of this gens to achieve prominence was Lucius Cincius Alimentus, who was praetor in 210 BC, during the Second Punic War, and preserved first-hand accounts of Hannibal's journey over the Alps.

== Origin ==
The nomen Cincius or Cintius is evidently not of Roman origin, but Chase is unable to classify it more precisely.

== Praenomina ==
The main praenomina of the Cincii were Lucius, Publius, Marcus, and Gaius, all of which were amongst the most common names throughout Roman history.

== Branches and cognomina ==
The only prominent family of the Cincii bore the cognomen Alimentus, derived from alimentum, "nourishment". Other cognomina of the Cincii included Faliscus, a Faliscan, Salvius, an Oscan or Umbrian praenomen, and Severus, a common surname meaning "stern" or "severe".

== Members ==
This list includes abbreviated praenomina. For an explanation of this practice, see filiation.

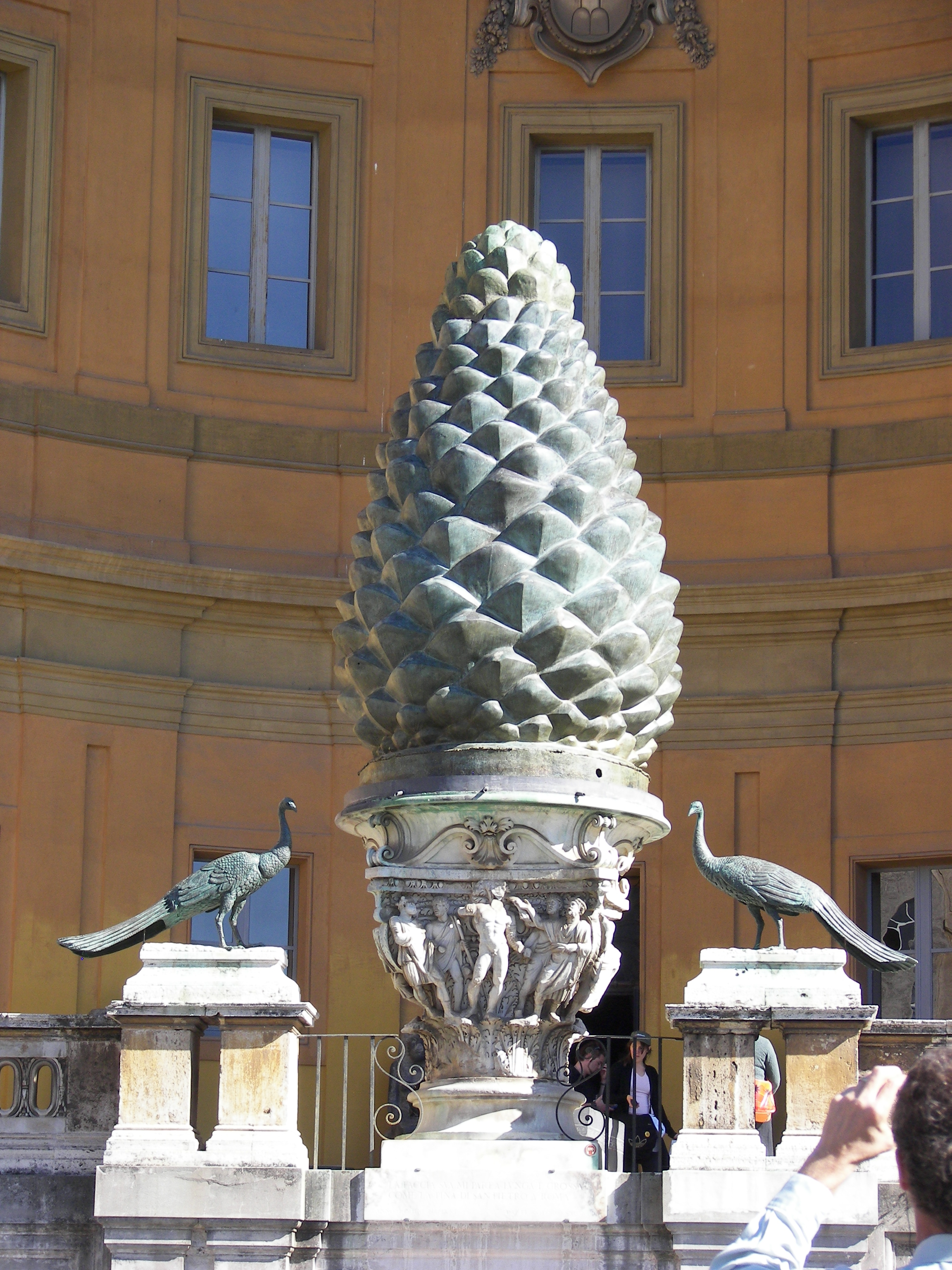
Bronze pinecone cast by Publius Cincius Salvius, Vatican City.

- Publius Cincius, (Note: This person's name is unclear in manuscripts of Livy, where it appears as circi, circa, or Sura. Cincius is the scholarly emendation.) a legate serving under the praetor Titus Otacilius Crassus in 217 BC. He returned to Rome, with the fleet that Otacilius had received from the consul Gnaeus Servilius Geminus after the Battle of Lake Trasimene.
- Lucius Cincius Alimentus, praetor in 210 BC, during the Second Punic War, received the province of Sicily, and remained there as propraetor in 209. He was a prolific writer on historical and antiquarian topics, and this has caused him to be confused with a later Lucius Cincius, who was a jurist and grammarian. While a prisoner of Hannibal, Alimentus was well-treated and obtained an account of the Carthaginians' overland journey to Italy. His work on the Roman calendar and early Roman history are discussed in detail by Niebuhr.
- Marcus Cincius Alimentus, tribune of the plebs in 204 BC, proposed the lex Cincia de Donis et Muneribus, or Muneralis Lex, concerning the compensation of lawyers. As governor of Pisae in 193 BC, he served under he consul Quintus Minucius Thermus in Liguria, and despatched a message to the senate, alerting them to a rebellion amongst the Ligures.
- Gaius Cincius, plebeian aedile at some point before 200 BC. His name appears on a milestone placed alongside the road from Rome to Ostia.
- Cincius Faliscus, an actor credited with introducing the use of masks in Roman comedy. He was probably active in the latter half of the second century BC.
- (Lucius?) Cincius, a jurist and grammarian cited along with and perhaps contemporary to Aelius Stilo and Varro. He has been frequently confused with the historian and antiquarian Lucius Cincius Alimentus, who lived during the Second Punic War.
- Lucius Cincius, a procurator serving under Titus Pomponius Atticus. Cicero's correspondence mentions him frequently.
- Marcus Cincius, named on a votive inscription from Delos, dating from the Republican era.
- P. Cincius P. l. Salvius, a freedman and bronze caster of imperial times, made the colossal pinecone that once stood next to the Temple of Isis, near the Pantheon. This sculpture later adorned the forecourt of old St. Peter's Basilica, and now forms the centerpiece of the Fontana della Pigna in the Giardino or Cortile della Pigna—Fountain, Garden, Courtyard of the Pinecone—in Vatican City.
- Cincius, a lieutenant of Gnaeus Domitius Corbulo, governor of Syria from AD 60 to 63. When Corbulo marched against the Parthians in 63, he left the government of Syria to Cincius.
- Cincius Severus, (Note: Cingius Severus in the manuscripts.) proconsul of Africa, presumably under Commodus, was noted by Tertullian for his lenient attitude toward Christians. A pontiff, after the death of Commodus he spoke on behalf of the college of pontiffs, urging the destruction of statues and inscriptions honouring the late emperor. Probably for this reason, Septimius Severus falsely accused Cincius of attempting to poison him, and had him put to death.

== See also ==
- List of Roman gentes

== Bibliography ==
=== Ancient sources ===
- Marcus Tullius Cicero, Cato Maior de Senectute; De Oratore; Epistulae ad Atticum; Epistulae ad Quintum Fratrem.
- Titus Livius (Livy), History of Rome.
- Publius Cornelius Tacitus, Annales.
- Sextus Pompeius Festus, Epitome de M. Verrio Flacco de Verborum Significatu (Epitome of Marcus Verrius Flaccus' On the Meaning of Words).
- Quintus Septimius Florens Tertullianus (Tertullian), Ad Scapulam.
- Aelius Lampridius, Aelius Spartianus, Flavius Vopiscus, Julius Capitolinus, Trebellius Pollio, and Vulcatius Gallicanus, Historia Augusta (Lives of the Emperors).

=== Modern sources ===
- T. Robert S. Broughton, The Magistrates of the Roman Republic, American Philological Association (1952–1986).
- George Davis Chase, "The Origin of Roman Praenomina", in Harvard Studies in Classical Philology, vol. VIII, pp. 103–184 (1897).
- Dictionary of Greek and Roman Biography and Mythology, William Smith, ed., Little, Brown and Company, Boston (1849).
- Theodor Mommsen et alii, Corpus Inscriptionum Latinarum (The Body of Latin Inscriptions, abbreviated CIL), Berlin-Brandenburgische Akademie der Wissenschaften (1853–present).
- August Pauly, Georg Wissowa, et alii, Realencyclopädie der Classischen Altertumswissenschaft (Scientific Encyclopedia of the Knowledge of Classical Antiquities, abbreviated RE or PW), J. B. Metzler, Stuttgart (1894–1980).
- Paul von Rohden, Elimar Klebs, & Hermann Dessau, Prosopographia Imperii Romani (The Prosopography of the Roman Empire, abbreviated PIR), Berlin (1898).
- D.P. Simpson, Cassell's Latin and English Dictionary, Macmillan Publishing Company, New York (1963).
