= Gaius Atinius Labeo =

Gaius Atinius Labeo is the name of at least two Roman praetors:

- Gaius Atinius Labeo (praetor 195 BC)
- Gaius Atinius Labeo (praetor 190 BC)

and possibly

- Gaius Atinius (praetor 188 BC)
