= Labeo (cognomen) =

Labeo is an ancient Roman cognomen derived from the word labea (English: lip), originally referring to a person with thick or prominent lips.

Labeo may refer to:

- Attius Labeo, 1st century AD Roman writer whose translations of the Iliad and the Odyssey were derided
- Claudius Labeo, Batavian military leader who fought for Rome in the Batavian rebellion (69–70 AD)
- Cornelius Labeo, 3rd century AD(?) Roman theologian and antiquarian
- Gaius Atinius Labeo (praetor 195 BC), tribune of the plebs in 196 BC
- Gaius Atinius Labeo (praetor 190 BC)
- Marcus Antistius Labeo (died 10 or 11 AD), Roman jurist, son of Pacuvius Labeo
- Pacuvius Labeo (died 42 BC), Roman jurist and assassin of Julius Caesar
- Quintus Fabius Labeo (fl. 196–180 BC), Roman quaestor, praetor, consul and pontiff
