= Fannia gens =

The gens Fannia was a plebeian family at ancient Rome, which first appears in history during the second century BC. The first member of this gens to attain the consulship was Gaius Fannius Strabo, in 161 BC.

== Origin ==
The nomen Fannius belongs to a large class of gentilicia that either originated at Rome, or cannot be shown to have come from anywhere else. Chase derives it from an obscure cognomen, Fadus.

== Praenomina ==
The only praenomina associated with the Fannii are Gaius, Marcus, and Lucius.

== Branches and cognomina ==
The only distinct family of the Fannia gens during the Republic bore the cognomen Strabo, originally given to someone given to squinting. This was one of a large class of surnames derived from the physical characteristics of the bearer. Other surnames occur under the Empire, including Quadratus, "square", and Caepio, an onion, but these seem to have been personal names, since they do not appear to have been passed down to the descendants of the bearers.

== Members ==
This list includes abbreviated praenomina. For an explanation of this practice, see filiation.

=== Fannii Strabones ===
- Gaius Fannius Strabo, grandfather of the consul of BC 161.
- Gaius Fannius C. f. Strabo, father of the consul of BC 161.
- Gaius Fannius C. f. C. n. Strabo, consul in BC 161, the year that rhetoricians were expelled from Rome. Fannius proposed a sumptuary law.
- Marcus Fannius (C. f. C. n.) Strabo, father of the historian.
- Gaius Fannius M. f. C. n. Strabo, consul in BC 122. He had been tribune of the plebs, and was elected consul through the influence of Gaius Gracchus, but once in office, he supported the aristocracy and obstructed the measures of Gracchus. He issued a proclamation commanding all of the Italian allies to leave Rome, and spoke against Gracchus' proposal to extend the franchise to the Latins. Fannius' speech was regarded as a masterpiece in Cicero's time.
- Gaius Fannius C. f. C. n. Strabo, had been, in his youth, a soldier under Scipio Aemilianus, and together with Tiberius Gracchus, was the first to mount the walls of Carthage on the capture of the city. He became an orator, whose style was harsher than that of his cousin, the consul of 122 BC, but gained fame as the author of a history of contemporary events, which was praised by Sallust.

=== Others ===
- Gaius Fannius, tribune of the people in BC 187. He asserted that neither he nor his colleagues (with the exception of Tiberius Sempronius Gracchus) would hinder the praetor Quintus Terentius Culleo from arresting and imprisoning Scipio Asiaticus, if he refused to pay a fine to which he had been sentenced.
- Fannia, the wife of Gaius Titinius, who married her in order to gain control of her considerable property. Gaius Marius interceded on her behalf when Titinius repudiated her but attempted to rob her of her dowry, and in gratitude Fannia provided shelter for Marius when he came to Minturnae as a fugitive in 88 BC.
- Gaius Fannius, an eques, who was called a frater germanus of Titinius, and had some transactions with Gaius Verres in BC 84.
- Marcus Fannius, one of the judices in the case of Sextus Roscius of Ameria, in BC 80.
- Lucius Fannius, served with Lucius Magius in the army of the legate Gaius Flavius Fimbria, in the war against Mithridates, in BC 84. They deserted and went over to Mithridates, under whom they served for many years. They were declared public enemies by the senate.
- Gaius Fannius Chaereas or Chaerea, a freedman of Greek extraction, whose slave was entrusted to the actor Quintus Roscius Gallus for training in his art. After the slave was murdered, Roscius obtained a farm in compensation, and Chaereas sued him for his share of the property. Roscius was defended by Cicero, who savaged Chaereas' character and appearance.
- Gaius Fannius, one of the accusers of Publius Clodius Pulcher in BC 61. Two years later, he was mentioned by Lucius Vettius as an accomplice in an alleged conspiracy against Pompeius. He may be the same Fannius who went over to Sextus Pompeius in 43, and was outlawed. In 36, he deserted Pompeius and went over to Marcus Antonius.
- Gaius Fannius, tribune of the people in BC 59, when he allowed himself to be used by Marcus Bibulus in opposing Caesar's agrarian law. A partisan of Pompeius, he went as praetor to Sicily in 49. The fall of Pompeius in the year after seems to have brought about the fall of Fannius also.
- Fannius, one of the commanders under Gaius Cassius Longinus in BC 42.
- Fannius Quadratus, a contemporary of Horace, who speaks of him with contempt as a parasite of Tigellius Hermogenes. He was one of those envious Roman poets who tried to depreciate Horatius, because his writings threw their own into the shade.
- Fannius Caepio, conspired with Murena against Augustus in BC 22. He was accused of majestas by Tiberius, and condemned by the judges in his absence, as he did not stand his trial, and was shortly afterwards put to death.
- Fannia, the second wife of Helvidius Priscus, accompanied her husband into exile during the reign of Nero, and again under Vespasian. After her husband's death, she persuaded Herennius Senecio to write his biography, but following its publication, Herennius was put to death by Domitian, and Fannia sent into exile.
- Publius Fannius Synistor, owner of the Villa Boscoreale, which was buried in the eruption of Vesuvius in AD 79.
- Gaius Fannius, a contemporary of the younger Plinius, and the author of a work on the deaths of persons executed or exiled by Nero, under the title of Exitus Occisorum aut Relegatorum. It consisted of three books, but more would have been added if Fannius had lived longer. The work seems to have been very popular at the time, both on account of its style and its subject.

== See also ==
- List of Roman gentes

== Bibliography ==
- Marcus Tullius Cicero, Brutus, De Legibus, De Oratore, De Republica, Epistulae ad Atticum, In Vatinium Testem, In Verrem, Laelius de Amicitia, Philippicae, Pro Quinto Roscio Comoedo, Pro Sexto Roscio Amerino.
- Gaius Sallustius Crispus (Sallust), apud Gaius Marius Victorinus.
- Quintus Horatius Flaccus (Horace), Satirae (Satires).
- Titus Livius (Livy), History of Rome.
- Marcus Velleius Paterculus, Roman History.
- Valerius Maximus, Factorum ac Dictorum Memorabilium (Memorable Facts and Sayings).
- Lucius Annaeus Seneca (Seneca the Younger), De Brevitate Vitae (On the Brevity of Life), De Clementia (On Clemency).
- Gaius Plinius Secundus (Pliny the Elder), Historia Naturalis (Natural History).
- Gaius Plinius Caecilius Secundus (Pliny the Younger), Epistulae (Letters).
- Lucius Mestrius Plutarchus (Plutarch), Lives of the Noble Greeks and Romans.
- Gaius Suetonius Tranquillus, De Claris Rhetoribus (On the Eminent Orators), De Vita Caesarum (Lives of the Caesars, or The Twelve Caesars).
- Appianus Alexandrinus (Appian), Bella Mithridatica (The Mithridatic Wars), Bellum Civile (The Civil War), Hispanica (The Spanish Wars).
- Aulus Gellius, Noctes Atticae (Attic Nights).
- Lucius Cassius Dio Cocceianus (Cassius Dio), Roman History.
- Gaius Julius Victor, De Arte Rhetorica (On the Art of Rhetoric).
- Paulus Orosius, Historiarum Adversum Paganos (History Against the Pagans).
- Ambrosius Theodosius Macrobius, Saturnalia.
- Pseudo-Asconius, Commentarius in Oratorio Ciceronis in Verrem (Commentary on Cicero's In Verrem), ed. Orelli.
- Scholia Gronoviana, In Ciceronis Pro Roscio Amerino (Commentary on Cicero’s Oration Pro Roscio Amerino).
- Johann Caspar von Orelli, Onomasticon Tullianum, Orell Füssli, Zürich (1826–1838).
- Poëtarum Latinorum Reliquiae (Surviving Works of Latin Poets), August Weichert, ed., B. G. Teubner, Leipzig (1830).
- August Wilhelm Ferdinand Krause, Vitae et Fragmenta Veterum Historicorum Romanorum (Lives and Fragments of Ancient Roman Historians), Ferdinand Dümmler, Berlin (1833).
- Henricus Meyerus (Heinrich Meyer), Oratorum Romanorum Fragmenta ab Appio inde Caeco usque ad Q. Aurelium Symmachum (Fragments of Roman Orators from Appius Claudius Caecus to Quintus Aurelius Symmachus), L. Bourgeois-Mazé, Paris (1837).
- Dictionary of Greek and Roman Biography and Mythology, William Smith, ed., Little, Brown and Company, Boston (1849).
- George Davis Chase, "The Origin of Roman Praenomina", in Harvard Studies in Classical Philology, vol. VIII, pp. 103–184 (1897).
- John C. Traupman, The New College Latin & English Dictionary, Bantam Books, New York (1995).
