= Cluvia gens =

Ancient Roman family

The gens Cluvia was a plebeian family at ancient Rome, known from the later Republic, and early imperial times. The first member of the gens to achieve prominence was Gaius Cluvius Saxula, praetor in 175 and 173 BC.

== Origin ==
The Cluvii were of Campanian origin. The earliest member of the family appearing in history was Faucula Cluvia, a courtesan at Capua during the Second Punic War.

== Praenomina ==
The praenomina used by the Cluvii of the Republic included Gaius, Spurius, Marcus, Manius, and Aulus. Publius appears amongst the Cluvii of imperial times.

== Branches and cognomina ==
The Cluvii do not appear to have been divided into distinct families. Individual members of the gens bore the personal cognomina Saxula, a diminutive of saxa, a rock, and Rufus, a common surname usually given to persons with red hair.

== Members ==
This list includes abbreviated praenomina. For an explanation of this practice, see filiation.

- Faucula Cluvia, a Capuan courtesan at the time of the Second Punic War; she secretly provided food to the Roman prisoners, and when the city was captured, her liberty and property were restored by a special decree of the senate.
- Gaius Cluvius Saxula, praetor in 175 BC, and praetor peregrinus in 173.
- Spurius Cluvius, praetor in 172 BC, obtained Sardinia as his province.
- Gaius Cluvius, legate of Lucius Aemilius Paullus in Macedonia, in 168 BC.
- Gaius Cluvius, an eques, and a contemporary of Cicero, was judex in a suit between Gaius Fannius Chaerea and Quintus Flavius, heard around 76 BC.
- Publius Cluvius P. f. Gallus, a supporter of Pompey in Asia, mentioned by Josephus.
- Marcus Cluvius, a wealthy banker at Puteoli, was a friend of Cicero, to whom he bequeathed part of his property.
- Aulus Cluvius M'. f., one of the duumvirs at Puteoli, between 50 and 20 BC.
- Cluvia M'. f., probably the sister of Aulus Cluvius, the duumvir.
- Aulus Cluvius A. l. Nicia, a freedman of Aulus Cluvius, the duumvir.
- Manius Cluvius M'. l. Heliodorus, a freedman of Manius Cluvius, perhaps the father or brother of the duumvir.
- Gaius Cluvius, consul designatus in 29 BC, was unable to serve, as a different consul was appointed in his place. Nevertheless Augustus enrolled him among the ex-consuls in the senate during his censorship. He was probably the same Cluvius who had been appointed by Caesar to superintend the assignment of lands in Cisalpine Gaul in 45 BC, and who also seems to have been triumvir monetalis at some point.
- Aulus Cluvius Celer, one of the aediles in AD 31.
- Cluvius, consul suffectus in either AD 39 or 40.
- Marcus Cluvius Rufus, consul suffectus under Claudius, before AD 65, and governor of Hispania under the emperor Galba in AD 69. He subsequently joined the party of Otho, then Vitellius. He is probably the same person as the historian Cluvius Rufus.
- Gaius Marius Marcellus Octavius Publius Cluvius Rufus, consul suffectus in AD 80, served from the Kalends of May to the Kalends of July.
- Publius Cluvius Maximus Paullinus, consul suffectus circa AD 138.
- Publius Cluvius P. f. Maximus Paullinus, son of Paullinus, the consul of 138, was consul suffectus in AD 152.

== See also ==
- List of Roman gentes

== Bibliography ==
- Marcus Tullius Cicero, Epistulae ad Atticum, Epistulae ad Familiares, Pro Quinto Roscio Comoedo.
- Titus Livius (Livy), History of Rome.
- Flavius Josephus, Antiquitates Judaïcae (Antiquities of the Jews).
- Gaius Plinius Caecilius Secundus (Pliny the Younger), Epistulae (Letters).
- Publius Cornelius Tacitus, Annales, Historiae.
- Gaius Suetonius Tranquillus, De Vita Caesarum (Lives of the Caesars, or The Twelve Caesars).
- Lucius Cassius Dio Cocceianus (Cassius Dio), Roman History.
- Johann Caspar von Orelli, Inscriptionum Latinarum Selectarum Amplissima Collectio (An Extensive Collection of Select Latin Inscriptions), Orell Füssli, Zürich (1828).
- Dictionary of Greek and Roman Biography and Mythology, William Smith, ed., Little, Brown and Company, Boston (1849).
- Theodor Mommsen et alii, Corpus Inscriptionum Latinarum (The Body of Latin Inscriptions, abbreviated CIL), Berlin-Brandenburgische Akademie der Wissenschaften (1853–present).
- Notizie degli Scavi di Antichità (News of Excavations from Antiquity, abbreviated NSA), Accademia dei Lincei (1876–present).
- René Cagnat et alii, L'Année épigraphique (The Year in Epigraphy, abbreviated AE), Presses Universitaires de France (1888–present).
- George Davis Chase, "The Origin of Roman Praenomina", in Harvard Studies in Classical Philology, vol. VIII, pp. 103–184 (1897).
- D.P. Simpson, Cassell's Latin and English Dictionary, Macmillan Publishing Company, New York (1963).
- Paul A. Gallivan, "The Fasti for the Reign of Claudius", in Classical Quarterly, vol. 28, pp. 423–426 (1978); "The Fasti for the Reign of Gaius", in Antichthon, vol. 13, pp. 66–69 (1979); "The Fasti for A.D. 70–96", in Classical Quarterly, vol. 31, pp. 186–220 (1981).
- Werner Eck, "Die Fasti consulares der Regierungszeit des Antoninus Pius, eine Bestandsaufnahme seit Géza Alföldys Konsulat und Senatorenstand" (The Consular Fasti for the Reign of Antoninus Pius: an Inventory since Géza Alföldy's Konsulat und Senatorenstand), in Studia Epigraphica in Memoriam Géza Alföldy, Werner Eck, Bence Fehér, Péter Kovács, eds., Bonn, pp. 69–90 (2013).
