= Mamercus Aemilius Scaurus =

Roman rhetorician, poet and senator

Mamercus Aemilius Scaurus (died AD 34) was a Roman rhetorician, poet and senator. Tacitus writes that Scaurus was "a man of distinguished rank and ability as an advocate, but of infamous life." He was suffect consul from July to the end of the year AD 21, with Gnaeus Tremellius as his colleague.

Scaurus was a member of the patrician Aemilia gens. His father was Marcus Aemilius Scaurus. The younger Scaurus was married twice. His first wife was Aemilia Lepida, who bore him a daughter; Lepida was accused of adultery and attempting to poison Publius Sulpicius Quirinius, found guilty, and exiled. After Lepida had died, or Scaurus divorced her, he married Sextia.

== Life ==
The first mention of Scaurus in historical literature comes in AD 14, at the time of Tiberius' accession to the throne. Both Scaurus and Quintus Haterius gave speeches of congratulation, which the new emperor suspected of being insincere. While Tiberius responded to Haterius' comments with invective, he passed over what Scaurus said in silence.

Scaurus appears periodically in Tacitus' Annales afterwards. In the year 21, when Corbulo complained on the Senate floor that a young noble, Lucius Sulla, had not shown him respect at a gladiatorial show despite being an ex-praetor, much older and more respected by the older senators, Scaurus, Lucius Arruntius, and other kinsmen of the young Sulla defended him. Arguments followed and were only ended when Drusus intervened and brought the body back to order. Both Sulla and Scaurus apologized to Corbulo.

The following year Scaurus appears in the Senate joining in the prosecution of Gaius Junius Silanus for extortion while proconsular governor of Asia, sacrilege and violating the law of majestas towards Tiberius. This prosecution resulted with Silanus exiled to the island of Cynthus.

Scaurus' final episode in the Senate began in the year 32, when Servilius and Cornelius Tuscus accused him and a number of other senators of treason. While some were saved by the intervention of one of the tribunes of the urban cohorts, Tiberius postponed Scaurus' case intending to handle it himself; Tacitus notes the emperor "affixed some ominous marks to the name of Scaurus." When Tiberius considered Scaurus' case two years later, his enemy the praetorian prefect Naevius Sutorius Macro added the charge that certain verses in a tragedy Scaurus had written could be interpreted to disrespect Tiberius. At the suggestion of his wife Sextia, Mamercus Aemilius Scaurus took his own life; she followed suit shortly thereafter.

== Notes ==
Political offices
Preceded by Tiberius IV; Drusus Julius Caesar	Roman suffect consul 21 with Gnaeus Tremellius	Succeeded by D. Haterius Agrippa; Gaius Sulpicius Galba
