= Racilia gens =

The gens Racilia was a minor plebeian family at ancient Rome. Members of this gens are mentioned as early as the fifth century BC, but few of them achieved any prominence in the Roman state.

== Origin ==
The nomen Racilius belongs to a large class of gentilicia formed from other names using the suffix -ilius. Such names were frequently, but not always derived from diminutives ending in -ulus or -ilus, but so abundant were names of this type that -ilius came to be regarded as a regular gentile-forming suffix. Here, Racilius seems to be formed from another nomen, Raecius.

== Praenomina ==
The Racilii used a variety of the most common praenomina, including Gaius, Lucius, Gnaeus, Marcus, Publius, Quintus, and Titus. In addition to these, some of the women of the Racilii are known to have borne praenomina, including Polla and Gaia.

== Branches and cognomina ==
None of the Racilii of the Republic appear to have borne cognomina, and there is no evidence that the gens was divided into distinct families, but a variety of surnames is found in imperial times.

== Members ==
This list includes abbreviated praenomina. For an explanation of this practice, see filiation.

- Racilia, the wife of Lucius Quinctius Cincinnatus, twice dictator and Roman consul in 460 BC.
- Lucius Racilius, tribune of the plebs in 56 BC, was a friend and ally of Cicero, and a staunch opponent of the tribune Publius Clodius Pulcher. He served under Caesar during the Civil War, but was put to death by Quintus Cassius Longinus, the governor of Spain, against whom he had conspired.
- Racilia C. l., a freedwoman named in an inscription from Trebula Mutusca in Sabinum.
- Polla Racilia P. f., buried at Rome with her nephews, Publius Racilius Celer and Publius Racilius Gallus.
- Gaius Racilius, named in an inscription from Trebula Mutusca.
- Gaius Racilius, possibly the freedman of Gaius Racilius Amphio, named in a funerary inscription from Carreum Potentia in Liguria.
- Gaius Racilius, named in an inscription from Clunia in Hispania Citerior.
- Gnaeus Racilius, named in an inscription from the Baths of Diocletian in Rome.
- Lucius Racilius, named in a funerary inscription from Fundi in Latium.
- Lucius Racilius, possibly the freedman of Gaius Racilius Amphio, named in a funerary inscription from Carreum Potentia.
- Marcus Racilius, named in a first-century BC inscription from Fundi.
- Publius Racilius P. f., dedicated a tomb at Rome for his sons, Publius Racilius Celer, Publius Racilius Gallus, and his sister, Polla Racilia.
- Quintus Racilius Q. f., named in an inscription from Rome, dating to AD 150.
- Marcus Racilius Ɔ. l. Agatho, a freedman, and the husband of Racilia Falerna, named in an inscription from Rome.
- Gaius Racilius C. l. Amphio, a freedman, and the husband of Licinia Salvia, named in a funerary inscription from Carreum Potentia. He may have been the former master of Gaius and Lucius Racilius, named in the same inscription.
- Lucius Racilius L. f. Ampliatus, a soldier from Picenum, serving in the third cohort of the vigiles, in the century of Marcus Masculus, buried at Rome, with a tomb built by his companion, Fulvius Augendus.
- Publius Racilius P. f. P. n. Celer, buried at Rome, together with his brother, Publius Racilius Gallus, and aunt, Polla Racilia.
- Publius Racilius T. l. Communis, a freedman mentioned in a first century inscription found at the present site of Ferrara, formerly in Etruria.
- Racilia Eutychia, dedicated a sepulchre at Rome for her husband, Gnaeus Racilius Telesphorus, and children, Gnaeus Racilius Fructuosus, and Racilia Fructuosa.
- Racilia Ɔ. l. Falerna, a freedwoman, and the wife of Marcus Racilius Agatho, named in an inscription from Rome.
- Lucius Racilius Felix Lampadarius, a flamen named in an inscription from Municipium Turcetanum in Africa Proconsularis.
- Titus Racilius Felix Lampadarius, a flamen named in an inscription from Municipium Turcetanum.
- Quintus Racilius Fronto, buried at Rome in a tomb built by Tiberius Claudius Lamyrus and Claudia Fortunata.
- Racilia Cn. f. Fructuosa, daughter of Gnaeus Racilius Telesphorus and Racilia Eutychia, buried in a family sepulchre at Rome.
- Gnaeus Racilius Cn. f. Fructuosus, son of Gnaeus Racilius Telesphorus and Racilia Eutychia, buried in a family sepulchre at Rome, aged ten years, eight months, twenty-two days, and five hours.
- Publius Racilius P. f. P. n. Gallus, buried at Rome, together with his brother, Publius Racilius Celer, and aunt, Polla Racilia.
- Gnaeus Racilius Herma, buried at Rome, in a tomb built by his client, Gaia Racilia Prepis.
- Gnaeus Racilius Januarius, buried at Rome, together with his wife, Licinia Marciana.
- Racilius Neptunalis, built two third-century tombs at Ammaedara in Africa Proconsularis for his parents, Aurelia Dativa, aged eighty-one, and Quintus Racilius Tibullus, aged ninety-three.
- Gaius Racilius C. l. Nestor, a freedman named in an inscription found at the present site of Hinojosa del Duque, formerly part of Hispania Baetica.
- Racilia Olympias, a freedwoman, built a sepulchre at Fundi in Latium, together with Marcus Racilius Princeps, for themselves and others.
- Racilia Peregrina, buried at Thacia in Africa Proconsularis, aged eighty-five.
- Marcus Recilius Potitus, buried at Fundi in a tomb built by Marcus Racilius Princeps and Racilia Olympias.
- Gaia Racilia Prepis, client of Gnaeus Racilius Herma, for whom she built a tomb at Rome.
- Marcus Recilius Princeps, a freedman, who built a sepulchre at Fundi with Racilia Olympias.
- Racilius Restutus, buried at Theveste in Africa Proconsularis, aged fifty-three.
- Sextus Racilius Sex. f. Rufus, buried at Rome.
- Racilia Saturnina, named in an inscription from Municipium Turcetanum.
- Gaius Racilius Severus, named in a libationary inscription from Florentia in Etruria.
- Racilia L. f. Silvana, buried at Satafis in Mauretania Caesariensis, aged thirteen.
- Gnaeus Racilius Telesphorus, husband of Racilia Eutychia, and father of Gnaeus Racilius Fructuosus and Racilia Fructuosa, buried in a family sepulchre at Rome, aged twenty-one years, seven months.
- Titus Racilius Tertullus Dativus, named in an inscription from Municipium Turcetanum.
- Quintus Racilius Tibullus, husband of Aurelia Dativa, and father of Racilius Neptunalis, buried at Ammaedara, aged ninety-three.
- Titus Racilius Valerianus, named in an inscription from Clunia in Hispania Citerior.

== See also ==
- List of Roman gentes

== Bibliography ==
- Marcus Tullius Cicero, Epistulae ad Familiares, Epistulae ad Quintum Fratrem, Pro Plancio.
- Aulus Hirtius, De Bello Alexandrino (On the Alexandrine War).
- Titus Livius (Livy), History of Rome.
- Scholia Bobiensia (Bobbio Scholiast), In Ciceronis Pro Plancio (Commentary on Cicero’s Oration Pro Plancio).
- Dictionary of Greek and Roman Biography and Mythology, William Smith, ed., Little, Brown and Company, Boston (1849).
- Theodor Mommsen et alii, Corpus Inscriptionum Latinarum (The Body of Latin Inscriptions, abbreviated CIL), Berlin-Brandenburgische Akademie der Wissenschaften (1853–present).
- Notizie degli Scavi di Antichità (News of Excavations from Antiquity, abbreviated NSA), Accademia dei Lincei (1876–present).
- René Cagnat et alii, L'Année épigraphique (The Year in Epigraphy, abbreviated AE), Presses Universitaires de France (1888–present).
- T. Robert S. Broughton, The Magistrates of the Roman Republic, American Philological Association (1952).
- Hispania Epigraphica (Epigraphy of Spain, abbreviated HEp), Madrid (1989–present).
