= Alimentus =

Alimentus may refer to:

- Lucius Cincius Alimentus, annalist in the time of the Second Punic War
- Marcus Cincius Alimentus, the tribune who originated the Lex Cincia
