= Aburia gens =

Ancient Roman family

The gens Aburia was a plebeian family at ancient Rome during the latter centuries of the Republic, and the first century of the Empire. The first member of this gens to achieve prominence was Marcus Aburius, praetor peregrinus in 176 BC.

== Praenomina ==
The Aburii are known to have used the praenomina Marcus, Gaius, and Decimus.

== Branches and cognomina ==
The first of the Aburii to appear in history bore no cognomen. The abbreviation Gem., probably for Geminus, a twin, appears on coins. In the first century, the surname Bassus is found. Coins of the Aburii do not depict members of the family, but do portray the popular motif of Heracles wearing a lion's mask.

== Members ==
This list includes abbreviated praenomina. For an explanation of this practice, see filiation.

- Marcus Aburius, as tribune of the plebs in 187 BC, opposed Marcus Fulvius Nobilior's request for a triumph, but was persuaded to withdraw his objection by his colleague, Tiberius Sempronius Gracchus. He was praetor peregrinus in 176.
- Gaius Aburius, sent as an ambassador to Masinissa and Carthage in 171 BC.
- Gaius Aburius M. f. Geminus, triumvir monetalis in 134 BC.
- Marcus Aburius M. f. Geminus, triumvir monetalis in 132 BC.
- Decimus Aburius Bassus, consul suffectus in AD 85, serving from the Kalends of September to the Kalends of November.

== See also ==
- List of Roman gentes

== Bibliography ==
- Titus Livius (Livy), History of Rome.
- Dictionary of Greek and Roman Biography and Mythology, William Smith, ed., Little, Brown and Company, Boston (1849).
- Theodor Mommsen et alii, Corpus Inscriptionum Latinarum (The Body of Latin Inscriptions, abbreviated CIL), Berlin-Brandenburgische Akademie der Wissenschaften (1853–present).
- Ernest Babelon, Description Historique et Chronologique des Monnaies de la République Romaine Vulgairement Appelées Monnaies Consulaires, Paris (1885).
- Arthur B. Cook, "Animal Worship in the Mycenaean Age", in Journal of Hellenic Studies, Macmillan and Company, London, vol. XIV, pp. 81–169 (1894).
