= Opimia gens =

Ancient Roman family

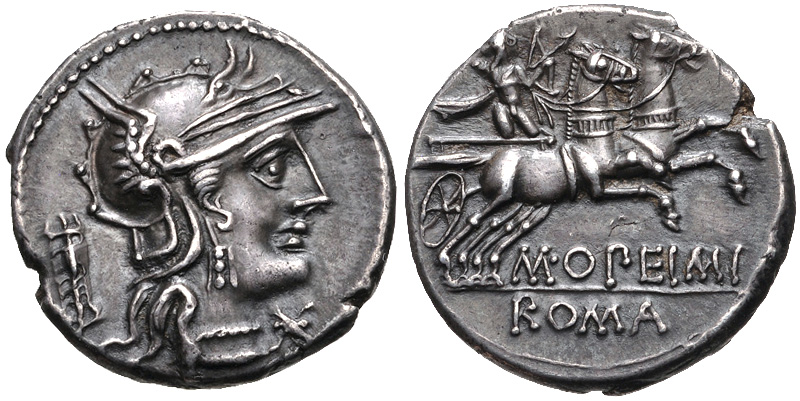
Denarius of Marcus Opimius, 131 BC. Roma is portrayed on the obverse, while Appolo is driving a biga on the reverse. Apollo and the tripod behind the head of Roma could be allusions to his father, who was perhaps Decimvir sacris faciundis.

The gens Opimia, also written Opeimia on coins, was a plebeian family at ancient Rome. Members of this gens are first mentioned during the time of the Samnite Wars, and they are mentioned in Roman historians from then down to the end of the Republic. The first of the Opimii to obtain the consulship was Quintus Opimius in 154 BC.

== Origin ==
The nomen Opimius is derived from the versatile Latin adjective opimus, which may be translated as "best, highest" or "fat, abundant, fruitful". The name belongs to a large class of gentilicia which were either Roman or which cannot be shown to have originated elsewhere.

== Praenomina ==
The chief praenomina of the Opimii seem to have been Quintus and Lucius, but the family also used Gaius and Marcus. All of these were very common names throughout Roman history.

== Branches and cognomina ==
The only surname used by the Opimii of the Republic is Pansa, meaning "broad-footed". However, most of the Opimii mentioned in ancient writers bore no cognomina.

== Members ==
This list includes abbreviated praenomina. For an explanation of this practice, see filiation.

- Lucius Opimius Pansa, quaestor in 294 BC, during the Third Samnite War, was slain in a Samnite attack upon the Roman camp.
- Quintus Opimius, grandfather of the consul of 154 BC.
- Quintus Opimius Q. f., father of the consul of 154 BC.
- Opimius, triumvir monetalis between 169 and 158 BC.
- Quintus Opimius Q. f. Q. n., consul in 154 BC, carried on the war against the Ligures with great success, and received the honour of a triumph. He was also triumvir monetalis between 169 and 158 BC, and praetor by 157.
- Lucius Opimius Q. f. Q. n., triumvir monetalis in 131 BC, praetor in 125, and consul in 121. He was a staunch opponent of the reforms of Gaius Gracchus, whose downfall and death he contrived. Later, Opimius himself fell to popular outrage after he allowed himself to be bribed by Jugurtha, and he died in exile.
- Marcus Opimius Q. f. Q. n., triumvir monetalis in 131 BC, the same year as his brother Lucius Opimius.
- Lucius Opimius, a soldier in the army of the consul Quintus Lutatius Catulus in 102 BC, won renown by slaying a Cimbrian warrior who had challenged him to single combat.
- Quintus Opimius L. f. Q. n., as tribune of the plebs in 75 BC, supported the lex Aurelia restoring the right of the tribunes to stand for the other magistracies after the expiration of their terms. In the following year, he was brought to trial by the praetor Verres, condemned, and deprived of his property.
- Opimius, a judex mentioned by Cicero. He might be the same man as the cavalry prefect.
- Marcus Opimius, a cavalry prefect serving under Metellus Scipio during the Civil War. He was taken prisoner by Gnaeus Domitius Calvinus in 48 BC.
- Opimius, a pauper mentioned by Horace.

== See also ==
- List of Roman gentes

== Bibliography ==
- Polybius, Historiae (The Histories).
- Marcus Tullius Cicero, Epistulae ad Atticum, In Verrem.
- Gaius Julius Caesar, Commentarii de Bello Civili (Commentaries on the Civil War).
- Pseudo-Asconius, Commentarius in Oratorio Ciceronis in Verrem (Commentary on Cicero's In Verrem), ed. Orelli.
- Titus Livius (Livy), History of Rome.
- Quintus Horatius Flaccus (Horace), Satirae (Satires).
- Lucius Ampelius, Liber Memorialis.
- Julius Obsequens, Liber de Prodigiis (The Book of Prodigies).
- Dictionary of Greek and Roman Biography and Mythology, William Smith, ed., Little, Brown and Company, Boston (1849).
- Bartolomeo Borghesi, Œuvres complètes de Bartolomeo Borghesi (Complete Works of Bartolomeo Borghesi), Paris (1862).
- George Davis Chase, "The Origin of Roman Praenomina", in Harvard Studies in Classical Philology, vol. VIII (1897).
- T. Robert S. Broughton, The Magistrates of the Roman Republic, American Philological Association (1952).
- Michael Crawford, Roman Republican Coinage, Cambridge University Press (1974, 2001).
