= Cosconia gens =

Plebeian family at Rome

The gens Cosconia was a plebeian family at Rome. Members of this gens are first mentioned in the Second Punic War, but none ever obtained the honours of the consulship; the first who held a curule office was Marcus Cosconius, praetor in 135 BC.

== Praenomina ==
The praenomina associated with the Cosconii are Marcus, Gaius, and Lucius.

== Members ==
This list includes abbreviated praenomina. For an explanation of this practice, see filiation.

- Marcus Cosconius, military tribune in the army of the praetor Publius Quinctilius Varus, fell in the battle fought with Mago in the land of the Insubrian Gauls, 203 BC.
- Marcus Cosconius M. f. (M. n.?), praetor in 135 BC, fought successfully with the Scordisci in Thrace. He is mentioned as a senator in 129.
- Lucius Cosconius M. f. M. n., triumvir monetalis in 118 BC.
- Gaius Cosconius, praetor during the Social War, where he had considerable success as a general. Probably the same Gaius Cosconius who later concluded the war in Illyricum as proconsul about 78 BC.
- Gaius Cosconius Calidianus, adopted from the Calidia gens, was an orator of little merit, distinguished for his vehement action and gesticulation.
- Gaius Cosconius, praetor in 63 BC, and subsequently granted the title of proconsul in Hispania Ulterior. Accused of extortion, but acquitted. Appointed in 59 by Caesar to a commission to divide the public lands in Campania, he died. Cicero declined Caesar's offer to replace him.
- Gaius Cosconius, tribune of the plebs in 59 BC, aedile in 57, and one of the judges of Publius Sextius in 56.
- Cosconia Gallita, the sister of Servius Cornelius Lentulus Maluginensis, consul in 10 BC, Publius Cornelius Lentulus Scipio, consul in AD 2, and Quintus Junius Blaesus, consul in AD 10, married Lucius Seius Strabo, and was the mother of Sejanus.
- Cosconius, a writer of epigrams during the time of Martial, whom he attacked on account of the length of his epigrams and their lascivious nature. He is severely handled in two epigrams of Martial.
- Cosconius, the author of a grammar and a work on "actiones."

== See also ==
- List of Roman gentes

== Bibliography ==
- Marcus Tullius Cicero, Brutus, Epistulae ad Quintum Fratrem, Pro Sulla, In Vatinium Testem.
- Marcus Terentius Varro, De Lingua Latina (On the Latin Language).
- Titus Livius (Livy), History of Rome.
- Marcus Valerius Martialis (Martial), Epigrammata (Epigrams).
- Plutarchus, Lives of the Noble Greeks and Romans.
- Appianus Alexandrinus (Appian), Bellum Civile (The Civil War).
- Eutropius, Breviarium Historiae Romanae (Abridgement of the History of Rome).
- Paulus Orosius, Historiarum Adversum Paganos (History Against the Pagans).
- Joseph Hilarius Eckhel, Doctrina Numorum Veterum (The Study of Ancient Coins, 1792–1798).
- Dictionary of Greek and Roman Biography and Mythology, William Smith, ed., Little, Brown and Company, Boston (1849).
- Freeman Adams, "The Consular Brothers of Sejanus", in The American Journal of Philology, vol. 76, No. 1, pp. 70–76 (1955).
- Robert K. Sherk, "The Text of the Senatus Consultum De Agro Pergameno", in Greek, Roman, and Byzantine Studies, vol. 7, pp. 361–369 (1966).
- Michael Crawford, Roman Republican Coinage, Cambridge University Press (2001).
