= Aebutia gens =

Ancient Roman family

The gens Aebutia was an ancient Roman family that was prominent during the early Republic. The gens was originally patrician, but also had plebeian branches. The first member to obtain the consulship was Titus Aebutius Helva, consul in 499 BC.

== Praenomina ==
During the first century of the Republic, the Aebutii used the praenomina Titus, Lucius, Postumus, and Marcus. In later times, they also used the name Publius.

== Branches and cognomina ==
The patrician Aebutii used the cognomen Helva (also found as Elva in some sources). Cornicen was a personal surname belonging to one of the Helvae. No patrician Aebutius held any curule magistracy from 442 to 176 BC, when Marcus Aebutius Helva obtained the praetorship. Carus was a cognomen of the plebeian Aebutii. Later surnames include Faustus, Liberalis, and Pinnius.

== Members ==
This list includes abbreviated praenomina. For an explanation of this practice, see filiation.

=== Aebutii Helvae ===
- Titus Aebutius T. f. Helva, consul in 499 BC.
- Lucius Aebutius T. f. T. n. Helva, consul in 463 BC.
- Postumus Aebutius Helva Cornicen, consul in 442 BC.
- Marcus Aebutius Helva, appointed triumvir for the establishment of a colony at Ardea in 442 BC.
- Marcus Aebutius Helva, praetor in 168 BC, obtained Sicilia as his province.

=== Other Aebutii ===
- Lucius Aebutius Faustus, a freedman.
- Publius Aebutius, brought the existence of the Bacchanalia at Rome to the attention of the consul Postumius Albinus in 186 BC.
- Titus Aebutius Parrus, praetor in 178 BC, assigned to Sardinia.
- Aebutius, praetor circa 125 BC who passed a Lex Aebutia "which probably limited greatly the application of the legis actiones and increased that of formulae in litigation."
- Gaius Aebutius, an aedile in 51 BC.
- Publius Aebutius Pinnius, found on Corinthian coins circa 39 BC
- Aebutius Liberalis, addressee of a letter by Seneca.

== See also ==
- List of Roman gentes
