= Cicereia gens =

Plebeian Roman family

The gens Cicereia was a minor plebeian family during the time of the Roman Republic. Its best known member, Gaius Cicereius, was the scriba, or secretary, of Scipio Africanus. He was elected praetor in 173 BC. Other Cicereii are known from inscriptions.

== Origin ==
The nomen Cicereius is probably derived from the same root as the cognomen Cicero, a surname of the gentes Claudia and Tullia. They appear to be connected with cicer, a chickpea, and may indicate that the ancestors of these families were engaged in the cultivation of that plant. Similar names include Bulbus, Fabius, Lentulus, Piso, and Tubero. Nomina ending in -eius were particularly common among families of Oscan origin, and could indicate that the Cicereii claimed descent from the Sabines or another Oscan-speaking people. Several of the Cicerei known from epigraphy were from Campania and Samnium.

== Praenomina ==
The only praenomina associated with the Cicereii are Publius, Gaius, and Lucius, three of the most common names throughout all periods of Roman history.

== Members ==
This list includes abbreviated praenomina. For an explanation of this practice, see filiation.

- Gaius Cicereius, the scriba, or secretary, of Scipio Africanus, was himself elected praetor in 173 BC. He obtained the province of Sardinia, but was ordered by the senate to conduct the war in Corsica. After defeating the Corsicans, Cicereius was denied his request for a triumph, and celebrated one on the Alban Mount at his own expense. He was appointed an ambassador to Gentius, king of the Illyrians in 172 and 167.
- Publius Cicereius C. f., one of the magistrates who dedicated a wall for the temple of Venus at Casilinum in Campania in 108 BC.
- Cicereia Orestis, named in a dedicatory inscription to the Bona Dea at Rome, made by her freedwoman, Elegans, and dating to the early part of the first century.
- Publius Cicereius Onomastus, a teacher who dedicated a tomb at Rome for his freedman, Publius Cicereius Eucarpus, dating to the first half of the first century.
- Publius Cicereius P. l. Eucarpus, a freedman buried at Rome, aged thirty, in a tomb dedicated by his former master, the teacher Publius Cicereius Onomastus, dating to the first half of the first century.
- Cicereius Ascanius, a centurion primipilus in the Legio XI Claudia, named in an inscription from Burnum in Dalmatia, dating to the early or middle part of the first century, along with Lucius Cicereius, and fellow centurion Cicereius Laevus.
- Lucius Cicereius, a soldier in the Legio XI Claudia, named in an inscription from Burnum, dating to the early or middle part of the first century, along with the centurions Cicereius Laevus and Cicereius Ascanius.
- Cicereius Laevus, a centurion primipilus in the Legio XI Claudia, named in an inscription from Burnum, dating to the early or middle part of the first century, along with Lucius Cicereius, and fellow centurion Cicereius Ascanius.
- Cicereia Vitalis, buried in a first-century family sepulchre at Rome, dedicated by her husband, Gaius Raecius Successus.
- Publius Cicereius Felix, a maker of lead pipes, named in an inscription from Londinium, dating between AD 43 and 70.
- Cicereius Aphrodisius, an eques buried in a third-century tomb at Rome, dedicated by Aurelia Felicula.
- Cicereia Zenonis, buried in a third-century tomb at Salernum in Campania, dedicated by her son, Aurelius Victor.

=== Undated Cicereii ===
- Gaius Cicereius, the former master of Cicereia Thaïs, who dedicated a tomb at Trebula Mutusca in Samnium for herself and Montanus, a slave still owned by Cicereius.
- Publius Cicereius Cotilus, buried at Rome, aged thirty-five, in a tomb dedicated by his sister, Claudia Paezusa.
- Cicereia C. f. Felicula, buried at Rome in a tomb dedicated by her father, Gaius Cicereius Secundus.
- Cicereia Libera, dedicated a tomb at Rome for her daughter, Proculeia Firmilla.
- Cicereia Pontice, dedicated a tomb at Rome for her client, the freedman Callistratus.
- Gaius Cicereius Secundus, a freedman who dedicated a tomb at Rome for his daughter, Cicereia Felicula.
- Cicereia C. l. Thaïs, a freedwoman who dedicated a tomb at Trebula Mutusca for herself and Montanus, the slave of Gaius Cicereius, apparently her former master.

== See also ==
- List of Roman gentes

== Bibliography ==
- Titus Livius (Livy), History of Rome.
- Valerius Maximus, Factorum ac Dictorum Memorabilium (Memorable Facts and Sayings).
- Dictionary of Greek and Roman Biography and Mythology, William Smith, ed., Little, Brown and Company, Boston (1849).
- Theodor Mommsen et alii, Corpus Inscriptionum Latinarum (The Body of Latin Inscriptions, abbreviated CIL), Berlin-Brandenburgische Akademie der Wissenschaften (1853–present).
- René Cagnat et alii, L'Année épigraphique (The Year in Epigraphy, abbreviated AE), Presses Universitaires de France (1888–present).
- George Davis Chase, "The Origin of Roman Praenomina", in Harvard Studies in Classical Philology, vol. VIII, pp. 103–184 (1897).
- The Roman Inscriptions of Britain (abbreviated RIB), Oxford, (1990–present).
