= Quintus Fabius Labeo =

Quintus Fabius Labeo was a Roman politician in the second century BC.

== Career ==
In 196 BC, Labeo served as quaestor. In 189/188 he served as praetor and as propraetor commander of the fleet. He first went to war against Antiochus III and destroyed 50 ships of the enemy. He celebrated a triumph at the shipyard. In the year 184 BC, Labeo was put in command of the colonies of Pisa and Potentia. In 183 BC, he was elected consul together with Marcus Claudius Marcellus as his colleague. The consuls were dispatched to Liguria, where they fought off invading Gauls. In the year 180, he served as pontiff.
