= Lucius Cincius Alimentus =

Roman politician, historian and writer

Lucius Cincius Alimentus (fl. about 200 BC) was a celebrated Roman annalist, jurist, and provincial official. He is principally remembered as one of the founders of Roman historiography, although his Annals has been lost and is only known from fragments in other works.

== Life ==
L. Cincius Alimentus was part of the Cincia clan of ancient Rome. He served as praetor in Sicily 210 BC and as propraetor in 209 BC, again in Sicily, commanding two legions. His most important legislation was the Cincian Law (Lex Cincia), which forbade the acceptance of payment for legal services.

Alimentus was captured in one of the early battles of the Second Punic War. He spent years as a prisoner of the Carthaginian general Hannibal, who—according to Alimentus's later account—confided in the Roman the details of his crossing of the Alps. He is last attested as an envoy in 208 BC. Scholar Bruce W. Frier mentions that none of the envoys are heard of again in the written records, and argues that the legation may have been captured while in Bruttium, Alimentus' release thus resulting from the peace treaty after Zama.

== Works ==
L. Cincius Alimentus wrote principally in Greek. According to Frier, Alimentus' Annals was written no later than 202 BC.

=== Annals ===
His major work was an Annals (Latin: Annales) or Roman History, following Q. Fabius Pictor in translating the annals of the pontifex maximus and other Roman sources to present a year-by-year prose Greek narrative of Roman history. The work has been lost, but its objectivity was praised by Dionysius of Halicarnassus and Polybius and it was frequently cited by Festus. Niebuhr, one of the major modern historians of Rome, praised Alimentus's methodology as well, describing him as a critical investigator of antiquity who threw light on the history of his country by researches among its ancient monuments. In particular, Alimentus has a far less triumphal account of the early relations between the Romans and the early Latins than most historians.

One of the surviving fragments of Alimentus dates the founding of Rome to the 4th year of the 12th Olympiad (729/728 BC). Trying to account for the discrepancy between this and the usual date of 753, Niebuhr hypothesized that Roman historians may have possessed a record placing the foundation 132 years before the reign of Tarquin the Elder, who reformed the Roman calendar. Alimentus may have converted those earlier 132 ten-month years into 110 twelve-month years before calculating his date, although the ancient Roman calendar had rounded out its years with a winter period of variable length.

=== Other works ===
L. Cincius Alimentus's account of his imprisonment in the Second Punic War and biography of the philosopher Gorgias probably originally formed part of his annals.

Other works attributed to him include a treatise On the Office of Jurisconsult (De Officio Iurisconsulti), containing at least two books; one book On Etymology (De Verbis Priscis); one book On the Power of the Consuls (De Consulum Potestate); one book On the Assemblies (De Comitiis); one book On the Festivals (De Fastis); one book On Initiation into the Mysteries (Mystagogicon); and a lengthy work On Military Matters (De Re Militari) spanning several books. In the last, he is known to have discussed military levies and the "fetial laws" (ius fetiale) such as the religious rituals involved in declaring war.

Some of these titles have been attributed to the antiquarian Cincius who supposedly wrote during the reign of Augustus, around 200 years later. Some scholars propose that both figures were actually a single person confused by later writers.
