= Hermann Sauppe =

German classical philologist (1809–1893)

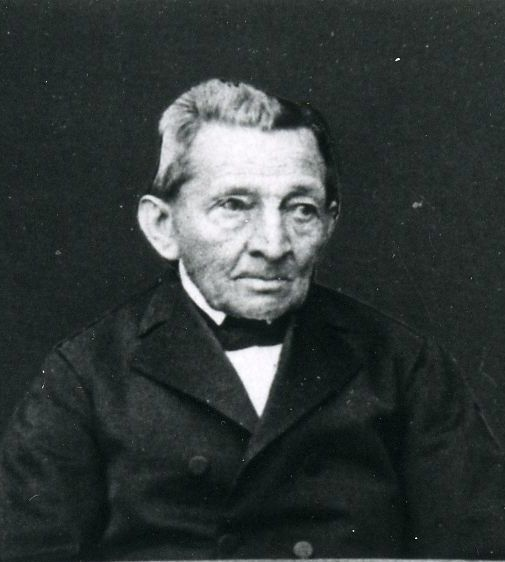
Hermann Sauppe (1809–1893)

Hermann Sauppe (9 December 1809 – 15 September 1893) was a German classical philologist and epigraphist born in Weesenstein, near Dresden.

In 1832 he earned his doctorate from the University of Leipzig, where he was a student of Gottfried Hermann (1772–1848), who was a profound influence to Sauppe's career. Beginning in 1833, he taught classes at a secondary school in Zurich, where in 1838 he became an associate professor at the university. In 1837 he was appointed chief librarian at the cantonal library at Zurich.

In 1845 he became director of the gymnasium in Weimar, and in 1856 was appointed professor of ancient languages at the University of Göttingen. At Göttingen he was responsible for establishment of the Pedagogical Seminary. Sauppe died in Göttingen.

Sauppe specialized in the field of epigraphy, and was also known for his work involving textual criticism. He was an advocate of Sachphilologie (philology of objects), believing that philological knowledge could be obtained not only through textual analysis, but also from other disciplines such as archaeology, numismatics, epigraphy, et al.

== Published works ==
Among his numerous writings were "Epistola critica ad Godofredum Hermannum" (Critical epistle to Gottfried Hermann, 1841) and "Oratores Attici" (1838–50). The latter work being a collection of fragmentary speeches and tracts by various Attica orators (co-edited with Johann Georg Baiter, 1801–1887). Other literary efforts by Sauppe are:

- Demosthenis Orationes selectae, 1845 – selected orations by Demosthenes.
- Philodemi De vitiis liber decimus, 1853 – edition of Philodemus.
- An explanation of Plato's "Protagoras", 1857.
- Hermanni Sauppii quaestiones Plautinae, 1858.
- Platons ausgewählte Dialoge, 1860 – Selected dialogues of Plato explained.
- Evgippii Vita Sancti Severini, 1877 – On Eugippius' biography of Severinus of Noricum.
