= Raecia gens =

The gens Raecia, also spelled Racia, was a minor plebeian family at ancient Rome. Members of this gens are first mentioned at the time of the Second Punic War. Marcus Raecius was praetor in 170 BC. However, after this the family fell into obscurity until imperial times.

== Origin ==
The nomen Raecius appears to be of Oscan origin, indicating that the Raecii were probably descended from one of the Oscan-speaking peoples of central and southern Italy, such as the Sabines or the Samnites. The nomen Racilia may have been derived from Raecia, using the common diminutive suffix -ilius.

== Branches and cognomina ==
None of the Raecii who appear in history during the Republic bore any cognomen, but the Raecii of imperial times used a variety of common surnames. Taurus, a bull, Gallus, a cockerel, and Leo, a lion, belong to a common type of cognomina derived from the names of familiar objects and animals. Rufus, red, was usually bestowed on someone with red hair, while Constans indicated someone steadfast or faithful.

== Members ==
- Marcus Raecius, one of two ambassadors sent to Massilia in 208 BC, in order to gather intelligence concerning the approach of Hasdrubal, who invaded Italy the following spring.
- Marcus Raecius, praetor in 170 BC, during the Third Macedonian War, levied soldiers along the Adriatic provinces, and required all of the senators to return to Rome in anticipation of the comitia.
- Marcus Raecius Taurus, one of the Arval Brethren in the time of Nero.
- Marcus Raecius Gallus, one of two persons who might be identified with Gallus, consul suffectus in AD 84. Ronald Syme proposed this identification in 1969, but later concluded that the consul was more likely to be identified with Publius Glitius Gallus. (Note: However, Gallivan asserts that inscriptionary evidence places Glitius' consulship during the reign of Vespasian, who died in 79.)
- Gaius Raecius Rufus, a senator in AD 173, mentioned in an inscription from Arba in Dalmatia as the patron of Gaius Raecius Leo.
- Gaius Raecius Leo, a client of the senator Gaius Raecius Rufus.
- Racius or Raecius Constans, governor of Sardinia during the reign of Septimius Severus, was put to death on the emperor's orders, as one of those who had allegedly overturned statues of Gaius Fulvius Plautianus, the praetorian prefect.

== See also ==
- List of Roman gentes

== Bibliography ==
- Titus Livius (Livy), History of Rome.
- Lucius Cassius Dio Cocceianus (Cassius Dio), Roman History.
- Dictionary of Greek and Roman Biography and Mythology, William Smith, ed., Little, Brown and Company, Boston (1849).
- Theodor Mommsen et alii, Corpus Inscriptionum Latinarum (The Body of Latin Inscriptions, abbreviated CIL), Berlin-Brandenburgische Akademie der Wissenschaften (1853–present).
- George Davis Chase, "The Origin of Roman Praenomina", in Harvard Studies in Classical Philology, vol. VIII, pp. 103–184 (1897).
- Paul von Rohden, Elimar Klebs, & Hermann Dessau, Prosopographia Imperii Romani (The Prosopography of the Roman Empire, abbreviated PIR), Berlin (1898).
- T. Robert S. Broughton, The Magistrates of the Roman Republic, American Philological Association (1952–1986).
- Ronald Syme, "Pliny the Procurator", in Harvard Studies in Classical Philology, vol. LXXIII, pp. 201–236 (1969); "P. Calvisius Ruso: One Person or Two?", in Zeitschrift für Papyrologie und Epigraphik, vol. 56, pp. 173–192 (1984).
- Paul A. Gallivan, "The Fasti for A.D. 70–96", in Classical Quarterly, vol. 31, pp. 186–220 (1981).
- John C. Traupman, The New College Latin & English Dictionary, Bantam Books, New York (1995).
