= Marcus Cluvius Rufus =

1st century Roman consul, senator, governor, and historian

Marcus Cluvius Rufus was a Roman consul, senator, governor, and historian who was mentioned on several occasions by Tacitus, Suetonius, Cassius Dio, Josephus and Plutarch.

== Career ==
Cluvius was consul suffectus prior to AD 65; from how those Roman historians mention him he could have held the fasces during the reign of Claudius, but Paul Gallivan believes that in "all probability Cluvius' consular date should be Neronian." He had been involved in the conspiracy to assassinate Caligula, but it is not known to what degree.

As an ex-consul during the early part of Nero's reign, Cluvius knew many members of the emperor's inner circle, He appeared as the emperor's herald at the games in which Nero made his appearance.

During the year of the four emperors, Cluvius was governor of Hispania. Tacitus said "Spain was under the government of Cluvius Rufus, an eloquent man, who had all the accomplishments of civil life, but who was without experience in war." Nobody had been endangered by his actions during Nero's reign. On the death of Galba, Cluvius first swore allegiance to Otho, but soon afterwards he became a partisan of Vitellius. Hilarius, a freedman of Vitellius, accused him of aspiring to obtain the government of Hispania independent of the emperor, but Cluvius went to Vitellius, who was then in Gaul, and succeeded in clearing his name. Cluvius is said to have pushed senators to demand more power from the emperor during the reign of Vitellius.

== Historian ==
Cluvius Rufus was an important historian whose writing and testimony, though now lost, certainly shaped modern understanding of first century Rome. He was a contemporary of Caligula, Claudius, and Nero, but little is known of the extent of his work except that it related to events during the reign of these emperors. Cluvius was one of the primary sources for Tacitus' Annals and Histories, Suetonius' The Lives of Twelve Caesars, Josephus' Antiquities of the Jews, Plutarch's Parallel Lives and probably for later historians.

== See also ==
- Cluvia (gens)

== Sources ==
Cluvius Rufus is mentioned in:

- Josephus Antiquities of the Jews XIX.1.13;
- Suetonius The Lives of Twelve Caesars, Life of Nero 21;
- Pliny the Younger, Epistulae IX.19;
- Plutarch The Parallel Lives, Life of Otho 3;
- Tacitus Annals, XII.20 and XIV.2;
- Tacitus Histories, I.8, II.58, II.65, III.65, IV.39 and IV.43
- Cassius Dio, Roman History, LXIII.14;
