= Apustia gens =

The gens Apustia was a plebeian family at Rome during the period of the Republic. The first member of this gens who obtained the consulship was Lucius Apustius Fullo, in 226 BC.

== Praenomina ==
The praenomina associated with the Apustiii included Lucius, Gaius, and Publius.

== Branches and cognomina ==
The only significant branch of the Apustia gens at Rome bore the cognomen Fullo. It was probably derived from the occupation of one of the Apustii, a cleaner of woolen cloths.

== Members ==
This list includes abbreviated praenomina. For an explanation of this practice, see filiation.

- Gaius Apustius, grandfather of the consul of 226 BC.
- Lucius Apustius, father of the consul of 226 BC.
- Lucius Apustius L. f. C. n. Fullo, consul in 226 BC, prepared for a Gallic invasion.
- Lucius Apustius L. f. L. n. Fullo, praetor in 196 BC.
- Lucius Apustius, commander of the Roman troops at Tarentum in 215 BC.
- Lucius Apustius, legate of the consul Publius Sulpicius Galba in Macedonia during the war against Philip in 200 BC, and later of Lucius Cornelius Scipio in 190.
- Publius Apustius, one of the ambassadors sent to the younger Ptolemaeus in 161 BC.

== See also ==
- List of Roman gentes
