= Johann Georg Baiter =

Swiss philologist (1801–1877)

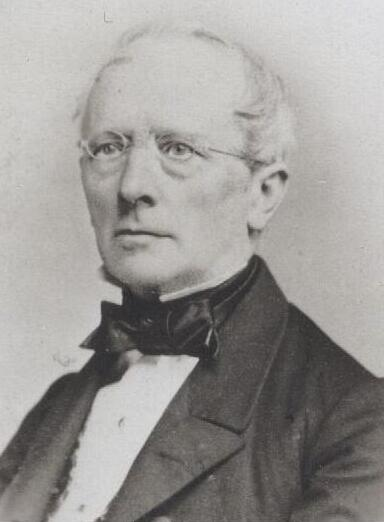
- Born: 31 May 1801; Zürich, Switzerland
- Died: 10 October 1877 (aged 76); Zürich, Switzerland
- Occupations: Philologist, textual critic

Johann Georg Baiter (31 May 1801 – 10 October 1877) was a Swiss philologist and textual critic.

== Life ==
He was born in Zurich, where he received his early education. He went on in 1818 to the University of Tübingen, but could not afford to stay there, and had to return to Zurich, where for several years he was a private tutor. From 1824 to 1829, he studied at the Ludwig-Maximilians-Universität München under Friedrich Thiersch; at the University of Göttingen, under Georg Ludolf Dissen; at the University of Königsberg, under Christian Lobeck. From 1833 to 1876 he was Oberlehrer at a gymnasium in Zurich, where he died.

== Work ==
Baiter's strong point was textual criticism, applied chiefly to Cicero and the Attic orators; he was very successful in finding the best manuscript authorities, and his collations were made with the greatest accuracy. Most of his works were produced in collaboration with other scholars, such as Johann Caspar von Orelli, who regarded him as his right-hand man. He edited Isocrates, Panegyricus (1831); with Hermann Sauppe, Lycurgus' Leocracea (1834) and Oratores Atticae (1838–1850); with Orelli and Winckelmann, a critical edition of Plato (1839–1842), which marked a distinct advance in the text, two new manuscripts being laid under contribution; with Orelli, Babrius, Fabellae Iambicae nuper repertae (1845); Isocrates, in the Didot collection of classics (1846).

== Collaborators ==
He had been associated with Orelli in his great work on Cicero, and assisted in Ciceronis Scholiastae (1833) and Onomasticon Tullianum (1836–1838). The Fasti Consulares and Triumphales were all his own work. With Orelli and (after his death) Karl Felix Halm, he assisted in the second edition of the Cicero, and, with Carl Ludwig Kayser, edited the same author for the Tauchnitz series (1860–1869). New editions of Orelli's Tacitus and Horace were also due to him. With Sauppe, he translated William Martin Leake's Topography of Athens.
