= Lex Atinia =

Ancient Roman law

The lex Atinia may refer to one of three pieces of Roman legislation.

Cicero says that the authors of the leges Atiniae came from Aricia (Phillipics, III, 6, 16).

== lex Atinia (197 BC) ==
The first lex Atinia was introduced by Gaius Atinius Labeo to order to found five coloniae civium in oram maritimam. It assigned three hundred families for the colonies of Volturnum, Liternum, Puteoli, Salernum and Buxentum and appointed, with three-year powers, the triumvirs M. Servilius Geminus, Q. Minucius Termus and Ti. Sempronius Longo: the implantation actually took place at the end of the three-year period in 194 BC.

== lex Atinia de usucapione ==
The lex Atinia de usucapione was also introduced by Gaius Atinius Labeo in 195-7 BC. The law dealt with usucaption, acquisition of a title or right to property by uninterrupted and undisputed possession for a prescribed term.

The law prevented the acquisition of title by continued possession of stolen goods. Aulus Gellius quotes it and cites its meaning.

== lex Atinia (before 149 BC) ==
The de tribunis plebis in senatum legendis was a law dealing with the enrolment of tribunes of the plebs into the Senate. It probably entitled a holder of the office to sit in the senate as a tribuniscius with a presumptive inclusion for the next senatorial lectio.

The law is mentioned by Gellius in a quotation from Varro.

== See also ==
- List of Roman laws
- Roman Law
