= Tremellia gens =

Ancient Roman family

The gens Tremellia was a minor plebeian family at ancient Rome. Members of this gens are first mentioned towards the end of the Second Punic War, but the highest rank ever attained by any of the Tremellii under the Republic was that of praetor. After falling into obscurity during the first century BC, the fortunes of this family briefly revived under the Empire, when Gnaeus Tremellius was appointed consul suffectus in AD 21, during the reign of Tiberius.

== Praenomina ==
The main praenomen of the Tremellii who rose to prominence in the Roman state was Gnaeus, although a few bore other names, including Gaius and Lucius.

== Branches and cognomina ==
The only cognomina borne by any of the Tremellii mentioned in history are Scrofa and Flaccus. Scrofa refers to a sow with piglets, and belongs to a large class of surnames derived from creatures and everyday objects. This cognomen was handed down through one branch of the Tremellii for a century, and Varro relates the story of how Lucius Tremellius Scrofa, quaestor in 143 BC, when attacked by the enemy, vowed to scatter them like a sow scattering her piglets, (Note: This story was related to Varro by Scrofa's grandson. Centuries later, Macrobius gave a different explanation.) thereby obtaining his surname. Flaccus seems to have been a personal surname, as it is borne by only one of the Tremellii; it originally designated someone with prominent or floppy ears, and belongs to a large class of cognomina derived from someone's physical features.

== Members ==
This list includes abbreviated praenomina. For an explanation of this practice, see filiation.

- Gnaeus Tremellius Flaccus, an ex-quaestor, was one of five ambassadors sent to Attalus I, the king of Pergamum, in 205 BC to bring back a sacred stone, representing the Magna Mater. In 203 he was one of the plebeian aediles, and the following year he became praetor, receiving the province of Sicily.
- Gaius Tremellius, (Note: Called Gnaeus in some sources.) praetor in an uncertain year, likely 175, 174, or 170 BC. In 173, he was one of the decemvirs chosen to divide lands in Liguria and Cisalpine Gaul between the Romans and their Latin allies.
- Gnaeus Tremellius, as tribune of the plebs in 168 BC, blocked a measure to extend the terms of the censors. While he was praetor in 159, he was fined for insulting the Pontifex Maximus.
- Gnaeus Tremellius, consul suffectus in AD 21, might have been a descendant of Gnaeus Tremellius Scrofa, the friend of Varro.

=== Tremellii Scrofae ===
- Lucius Tremellius Scrofa, quaestor in 143 BC, served under Aulus Licinius Nerva, the governor of Macedonia, and put down a revolt. Scrofa likewise served as praetor, some time prior to 135 BC.
- Tremellius Scrofa, quaestor in 71 BC, served under Crassus in the Third Servile War, and was wounded while giving chase to Spartacus.
- Gnaeus Tremellius Scrofa, a friend of Varro of Atticus, was probably the same Gnaeus Tremellius who was one of the judges at the trial of Verres in 70 BC, and a military tribune the following year. He later served under Caesar in the Gallic Wars, and was praetor in an uncertain year.
- Tremellius (Cn. f.) Scrofa, the son of Varro's friend, mentioned by Cicero in 45 BC.

== See also ==
List of Roman gentes

== Bibliography ==
- Marcus Tullius Cicero, Epistulae ad Atticum, In Verrem.
- Marcus Terentius Varro, Rerum Rusticarum (Rural Matters).
- Titus Livius (Livy), History of Rome.
- Gaius Plinius Secundus (Pliny the Elder), Historia Naturalis (Natural History).
- Lucius Mestrius Plutarchus (Plutarch), Lives of the Noble Greeks and Romans.
- Eutropius, Breviarium Historiae Romanae (Abridgement of the History of Rome).
- Ambrosius Theodosius Macrobius, Saturnalia.
- Dictionary of Greek and Roman Biography and Mythology, William Smith, ed., Little, Brown and Company, Boston (1849).
- George Davis Chase, "The Origin of Roman Praenomina", in Harvard Studies in Classical Philology, vol. VIII, pp. 103–184 (1897).
- Paul von Rohden, Elimar Klebs, & Hermann Dessau, Prosopographia Imperii Romani (The Prosopography of the Roman Empire, abbreviated PIR), Berlin (1898).
- T. Robert S. Broughton, The Magistrates of the Roman Republic, American Philological Association (1952–1986).
- Alison E. Cooley, The Cambridge Manual of Latin Epigraphy, Cambridge University Press (2012).
