= Karl Felix Halm =

German classical philologist and librarian (1809–1882)

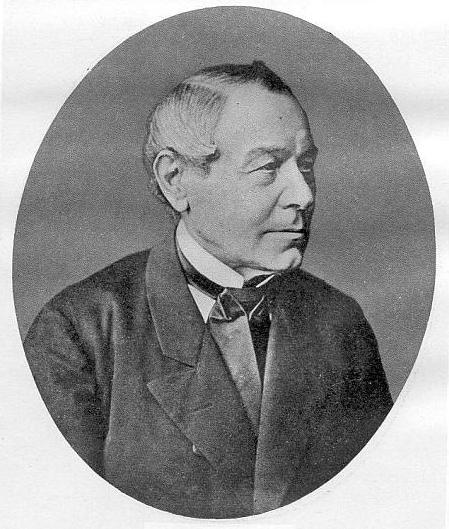
- Born: 5 April 1809; Munich, Germany
- Died: 5 October 1882 (aged 73); Munich, Germany

Karl Felix Halm (also Carl; Karl Felix Ritter von Halm after 1872; 5 April 1809 – 5 October 1882) was a German classical scholar and critic.

== Life ==
He was born in Munich. In 1849, having held appointments at Speyer and Hadamar, he became rector of the newly founded Maximiliansgymnasium in Munich, and in 1856 director of the royal library and professor at the Ludwig-Maximilians-Universität München (LMU). These posts he held until his death.

== Works ==
Halm is known chiefly as the editor of Cicero and other Latin prose authors, although during his early career he also devoted considerable attention to Greek and also authored an edition of Aesop's fables in the Greek. After the death of J.C. Orelli, he joined J.G. Baiter in the preparation of a revised critical edition of the rhetorical and philosophical writings of Cicero (1854–1862). His school editions of some of the speeches of Cicero in the Haupt and Sauppe series, with notes and introductions, were very successful. He also edited a number of classical texts for the Teubner series, the most important of which are Tacitus (4th edition, 1883); Rhetores Latini minores (1863); Quintilian (1868); Sulpicius Severus (1866); Minucius Felix together with Firmicus Maternus De errore (1867); Salvianus (1877) and Victor Vitensis's Historia persecutionis Africanae provinciae (1878). He was also an enthusiastic collector of autographs.

== Scholarly shorthand ==
Scholars of the period will sometimes talk of the "Halmian" edition, or even of the "Halmianam" edition if they are writing in Latin. By this they mean an edition authored or edited by Halm.
