= Gaius Atinius (praetor 188 BC) =

2nd century BC Roman praetor

Gaius Atinius served as military tribune in Gaul under the consul Tiberius Sempronius Longus in 194 BC. He is probably the same Gaius Atinius who served as praetor in 188, and received Hispania Ulterior as his province. He remained there as propraetor, defeating the Lusitani, before being killed during the siege of Hasta in 186 BC.

The historian Titus Livius does not assign him a cognomen, but the Dictionary of Greek and Roman Biography and Mythology indicates that he was one of the Atinii Labeones. He does not appear to have been the same man as Gaius Atinius Labeo, praetor peregrinus in 195 BC, nor the same as Gaius Atinius Labeo, praetor in Sicilia in 190. He may have been a brother of the Marcus Atinius who was slain in Gaul while serving as praefectus socium under Sempronius in 194.

== See also ==
- Atinia (gens)
