= Cincius =

Antiquarian writer probably during the time of Augustus

Cincius was a Roman antiquarian writer probably of the time of Augustus. His praenomen was perhaps Lucius, but his cognomen goes unrecorded. He is frequently confused with the annalist Lucius Cincius Alimentus, who fought in the Second Punic War, although some scholars still maintain that Cincius Alimentus was also the antiquarian.

== Works ==
Cincius' work survives only in citations by later authors, including Livy and Festus. For example, Festus cites a work "On the power of the consuls" (Lat. de consulum potestate, p. 276 L). The several works attributed to "Cincius" have been assigned to one or the other of the two writers by scholars whose criteria for distinguishing them produce varying results. The authorship of the book De fastis ("On the Fasti"), for instance, has been attributed to either one. T.P. Wiseman finds it likely that Cincius wrote "a Pausanias-like guide to the antiquities of the Capitol (if not the whole city)," including a collection of old inscriptions, and makes a jurist of him as well with a work De officio iurisconsulti.
