= Pupius =

Pupius was a 1st-century BCE Roman author about whom little is known and none of whose work survives, save for possibly one couplet. His work is referenced by Horace, who describes his tragedies as "tearful" ("lacrimosa"). In one scholiastic comment on Horace, it is stated that Pupius "so moved the feelings of the spectators that he compelled them to tears." According to this same scholiastic note, Pupius authored the couplet "my friends and good acquaintances will weep for my death; for the people wept for me enough while I was alive." However, this couplet was perhaps not actually authored by Pupius himself, but instead a later creation modeled on the general style of epitaphs.
