= Atinia gens =

Ancient Roman plebeian family

The gens Atinia was a minor plebeian family at ancient Rome, which came to prominence during the late Republic. No members of this gens ever attained the consulship, although several were praetors in the early second century BC, beginning with Gaius Atinius Labeo 195.

== Origin ==
The nomen Atinius belongs to a class of gentilicia originally derived from surnames ending in -inus. The geographical and ethnic origin of this gens is not stated in any surviving authority, but if based on the town of Atina—originally a Volscian city in eastern Latium, subsequently occupied by the Samnites, then a Roman municipium following the Samnite Wars—it would follow the pattern of numerous other localities that gave rise to Roman gentes. With the exception of Titus Atinius, a figure ascribed to the mythology of the early Republic, all of the Atinii occurring in history belong to the period following the Second Punic War.

== Branches and cognomina ==
The only distinct family of this gens bore the cognomen Labeo, a surname originally referring to someone with thick or prominent lips, one of an abundant class of cognomina derived from the physical characteristics of an individual.

== Members ==
- Titus Atinius, according to legend, 491 BC had visions foretelling catastrophe unless the Great Games were held on a grand scale. The senate heeded his warning, and held the festival, averting divine wrath.
- Gaius Atinius Labeo, tribune of the plebs in 196 BC, required the senate to consider the claims of the consuls Lucius Furius Purpureo and Marcus Claudius Marcellus to a triumph separately, and passed a law establishing five colonies. Praetor peregrinus in 195, he was probably the author of the lex Atinia de usucapione.
- Gaius Atinius, one of the military tribunes in Gaul in 194 BC, where he served under the command of the consul Tiberius Sempronius Longus. He might be the same person as Gaius Atinius Labeo, praetor in 188 BC.
- Marcus Atinius, killed in Gaul while serving as praefectus socium under the consul Tiberius Sempronius Longus in 194 BC.
- Gaius Atinius Labeo, praetor in 190 BC, received the province of Sicilia.
- Gaius Atinius (Labeo), praetor in 188 BC, received Hispania Ulterior as his province.
- Marcus and Gaius Atinius, two of the main leaders of the Bacchanalia in 186 BC, arrested and brought before the consuls Spurius Postumius Albinus and Quintus Marcius Philippus for confession.

== See also ==
- List of Roman gentes

== Bibliography ==
- Titus Livius (Livy), History of Rome.
- Aulus Gellius, Noctes Atticae (Attic Nights).
- Dictionary of Greek and Roman Biography and Mythology, William Smith, ed., Little, Brown and Company, Boston (1849).
- Dictionary of Greek and Roman Geography, William Smith, ed., Little, Brown and Company, Boston (1854).
- George Davis Chase, "The Origin of Roman Praenomina", in Harvard Studies in Classical Philology, vol. VIII, pp. 103–184 (1897).
- T. Robert S. Broughton, The Magistrates of the Roman Republic, American Philological Association (1952–1986).
