= Titus Otacilius Crassus (praetor 217 BC) =

Titus Otacilius Crassus was a Roman Praetor in 217 BC. He was commander of a fleet in Lilybaeum, that was led in a raid of Africa in 215 and 212 BCE. In 214 BCE Octacilius Crassus stood to obtain the consulship. However, Fabius Maximus critiqued Titus for lacking the necessary skills to serve as consul, depriving Crassus of his consulship. Instead, he received a second praetorship. Alongside a praetorship, Crassus may have been a pontif or augur. Eventually Titus would also go on to be governor of Sicilia. He commanded the Lilybaeum fleet from 213 BCE to 211 BCE, indecisively maneuvering against the Carthaginian admiral Bomilcar.

He died naturally in 211 BCE.

Crassus was a maternal half-brother of Marcus Claudius Marcellus.
