= Johann Caspar von Orelli =

Swiss classical scholar (1787–1849)

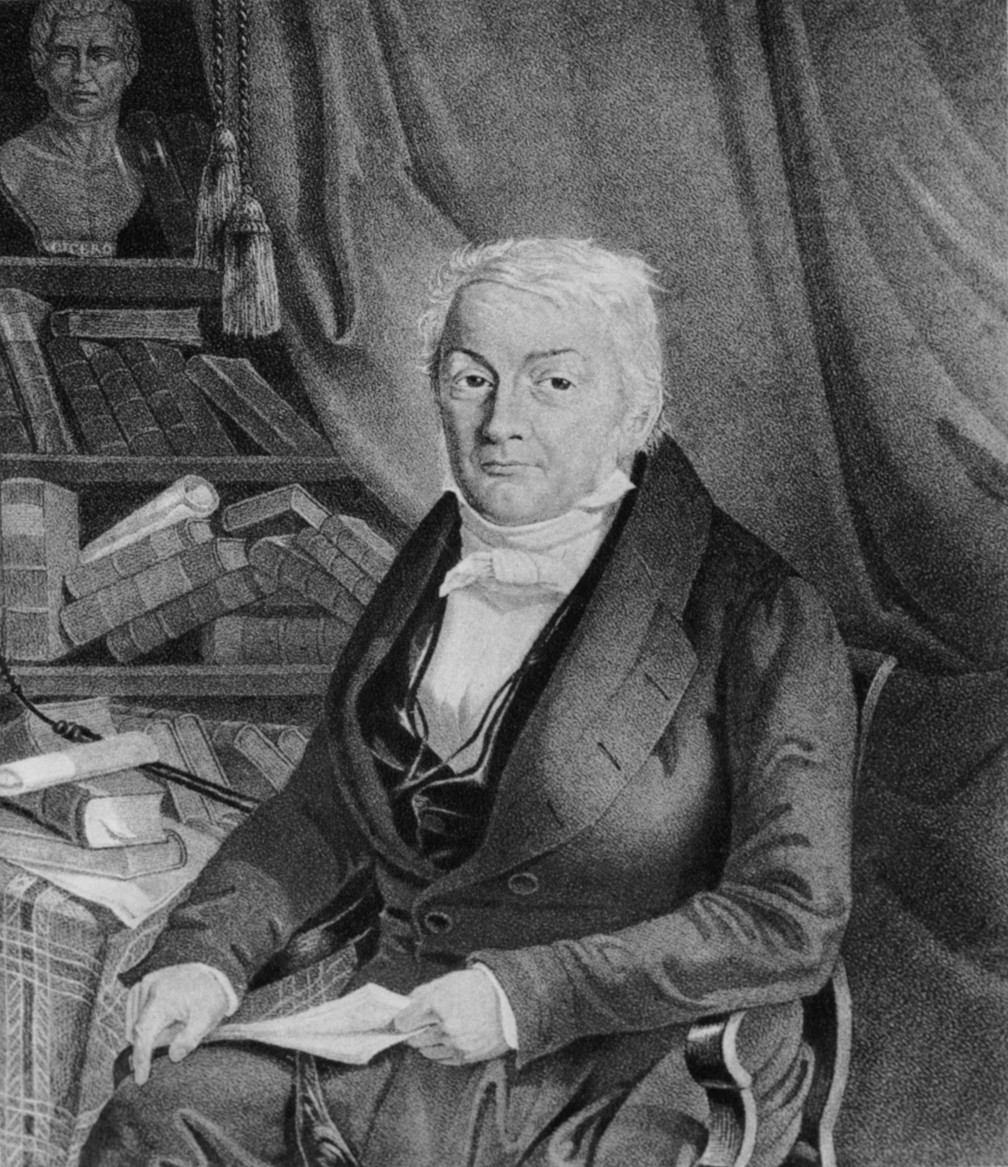
Portrait by Ludwig Wegner

Johann Caspar von Orelli (Latin Iohannes Caspar Orellius; 13 February 1787 – 6 January 1849), was a Swiss classical scholar.

== Life ==
He was born at Zürich of a distinguished Italian-speaking family from Locarno which had taken refuge in German-speaking Switzerland at the time of the Protestant Reformation. His cousin, Johann Conrad Orelli (1770–1826), was the author of several works in the department of later Greek literature.

From 1807 to 1814 Orelli worked as preacher in the reformed community of Bergamo, where he acquired the taste for Italian literature which led to the publication of Contributions to the History of Italian Poetry (1810) and a biography (1812) of Vittorino da Feltre, his ideal of a teacher.

In 1814 he became teacher of modern languages and history at the cantonal school at Chur; in 1819, professor of eloquence and hermeneutics at the Carolinum, Zürich, and in 1833 professor at the new University of Zürich, the foundation of which was largely due to his efforts. His attention during this period was mainly devoted to classical literature and antiquities. He had already published (1814) an edition, with critical notes and commentary, of the Antidosis of Isocrates, the complete text of which, based upon the manuscripts in the Ambrosian and Laurentian libraries, had been made known by Andreas Mustoxydis of Corfu.

He was a most liberal-minded man, both in politics and religion, an enthusiastic supporter of popular education and a most inspiring teacher. He took great interest in the struggle of the Greeks for independence, and strongly favoured the appointment of the notorious David Strauss to the chair of dogmatic theology at Zürich, which led to the disturbance of September 6, 1839 and the fall of the liberal government.

== Work ==
The three scholarly works upon which his reputation rests are the following:

1. A complete edition of Cicero in eight volumes (1826–1838). The first four volumes contained the text (new ed., 1845–1863), the fifth the old Scholiasts, the remaining three (called Onomasticon Tullianum) a life of Cicero, a bibliography of previous editions, indexes of geographical and historical names, of laws and legal formulae, of Greek words, and the consular annals. After his death, the revised edition of the text was completed by J.G. Baiter and K. Halm, and contained numerous emendations by Theodor Mommsen and J.N. Madvig.
2. The works of Horace (1837–1838). The exegetical commentary, although confessedly only a compilation from the works of earlier commentators, shows great taste and extensive learning, although hardly up to the exacting standard of modern criticism.
3. A collection of Latin inscriptions (Inscriptionum Latinarum Selectarum Collectio; 1828; revised edition by Wilhelm Henzen, 1856), extremely helpful for the study of Roman public and private life and religion.

His editions of Plato (1839–1841, including the old scholia, in collaboration with A. W. Winckelmann) and Tacitus (1846–1848) also deserve mention.

In 1832 he became a third-class corresponding member, living abroad, of the Royal Institute of the Netherlands.
