= Gaius Atinius Labeo (praetor 195 BC) =

Gaius Atinius Labeo was tribune of the plebs in 196 BC, and carried a bill authorizing five colonies. He also joined with the tribune Quintus Marcius Ralla in vetoing the attempt of the consul, Marcus Claudius Marcellus, to prevent peace with Philip.

In 195 BC, Atinius was praetor peregrinus. He may have been the author of the lex Atinia de usucapione.

Atinius seems to have been a different man from the Gaius Atinius Labeo who was praetor in Sicilia in 190 BC, and the Gaius Atinius who was praetor in Hispania Ulterior in 188.

== See also ==
- Atinia (gens)
