= Marcus (praenomen) =

Latin personal name

Marcus (Latin pronunciation: [ˈmaːrkʊs]), feminine Marca or Marcia, is a Latin praenomen, or personal name, which was one of the most common names throughout Roman history. The praenomen was used by both patrician and plebeian families, and gave rise to the patronymic gens Marcia, as well as the cognomen Marcellus. It was regularly abbreviated M.

At all periods of Roman history, Marcus was the third-most popular praenomen, trailing only Lucius and Gaius. Although many prominent families did not use it, it was a favorite of countless others. The name survived the Roman Empire and has continued to be used, in various forms, into modern times.

== Origin and meaning of the name ==
The praenomen Marcus is generally thought to be derived from the name of the god Mars. It has been proposed that it was originally given to children who were born in the month of Martius (March), which was itself named in honor of the god Mars.

The feminine form of Marcus should be Marca. However, surviving examples indicate that Marcia, with an "i", was more common. The same was true of the praenomen Tita or Titia.

The Etruscan form of this praenomen is Marce.

== See also ==
- Roman naming conventions
