= Gaius (praenomen) =

Latin personal name

Gaius (/ˈɡaɪəs/), feminine Gaia, is a Latin praenomen, or personal name, and was one of the most common names throughout Roman history. The praenomen was used by both patrician and plebeian families, and gave rise to the patronymic gens Gavia. The name was regularly abbreviated C., based on the original spelling, Caius, which dates from the period before the letters "C" and "G" were differentiated. The reversed Ɔ. stood for the feminine form Gaia.

Throughout Roman history, Gaius was generally the second-most common praenomen, following only Lucius. Although many prominent families did not use it at all, it was so widely distributed amongst all social classes that Gaius became a generic name for any man, and Gaia for any woman. A familiar Roman wedding ceremony included the words, spoken by the bride, ubi tu Gaius, ego Gaia ("as you are Gaius, I am Gaia"), to which the bridegroom replied, ubi tu Gaia, ego Gaius. The name survived the collapse of the Western Empire in the fifth century, and continued into modern times.

== Origin and meaning ==
The author of De Praenominibus ("Concerning Praenomina") states that Gaius is derived from the same root as gaudere, "to rejoice". Although Paris and the unidentified authorities whom he consulted probably relied on folk etymology, modern scholars generally concur with this derivation.

The original form of the name was probably Gavius, in which form it was also used by the Oscans; in Faliscan it appears as Kavios on the fifth-century BC Acquoria Cippus. However, in Latin it had already lost its medial "v" by the time of the earliest inscriptions. The older three-syllable pronunciation given above, in which the long "a" and short "i" are pronounced as full vowels: [ˈɡaːiʊs], is evidence of the original form. This pronunciation persisted, alongside the later two-syllable form in which "a" and "i" have concatenated to a diphthong: [ˈɡajjʊs], throughout the period of the Roman Republic. The existence of the patronymic gens Gavia also indicates the original form of the name, although it could be argued that this family's name was derived from the Oscan praenomen Gavius. But as Gaius and Gavius are apparently based on the same root, this distinction is of limited importance.

In the form Cae, this praenomen was also popular amongst the Etruscans, who borrowed many names from both Latin and Oscan.

== Derived names ==
The following personal names are derived from Gaius:

- Catalan: Gai or Cai
- Croatian: Kajo
- French: Caïus
- German: Kaius
- Greek: Γάιος (Gáios)
- Italian: Gaio
- Latin: Gaius
- Portuguese: Caio
- Romanian: Caius
- Spanish: Cayo or Gayo
- Welsh: Cai

== See also ==
- Roman naming conventions

== Bibliography ==
- Liber de Praenominibus, a short treatise of uncertain authorship, traditionally appended to Valerius Maximus' Factorum ac Dictorum Memorabilium (Memorable Facts and Sayings).
- Marcus Fabius Quintilianus (Quintilian), Institutio Oratoria (Institutes of Oratory).
- Lucius Mestrius Plutarchus (Plutarch), "Quaestiones Romanae" (Roman Questions), in Moralia.
- George Davis Chase, "The Origin of Roman Praenomina", in Harvard Studies in Classical Philology, vol. VIII, pp. 103–184 (1897).
- Harper's Dictionary of Classical Literature and Antiquities, Harry Thurston Peck, ed. (Second Edition, 1897).
- Jacques Heurgon, La Vie quotidienne chez lez Etrusques (Daily Life of the Etruscans), Hachette, Paris (1961, 1989).
- Mika Kajava, Roman Female Praenomina: Studies in the Nomenclature of Roman Women, Acta Instituti Romani Finlandiae (1994).
- Fred C. Woudhuizen, "Traces of Ethnic Identities in Etruscan Onomastics", in Talanta, vol. xxxviii–xxxix, pp. 259–276 (2006–2007).
