= Praetor =

Magistrate of the Roman Republic

Praetor (/ˈpriːtər/ PREE-tər; Classical Latin: [ˈprae̯tɔr]), also pretor, was the title granted by the government of ancient Rome to a man acting in one of two official capacities: (i) the commander of an army, and (ii) as an elected magistratus (magistrate), assigned to discharge various duties. The functions of the magistracy, the praetura (praetorship), are described by the adjective itself: (Note: In the Latin language, the ending of the adjective agrees with the case, gender, and number, of the noun, which is why the ending of praetori- varies in the phrases given.) the praetoria potestas (praetorian power), the praetorium imperium (praetorian authority), and the praetorium ius (praetorian law), the legal precedents established by the praetores (praetors). Praetorium, as a substantive, denoted the location from which the praetor exercised his authority, either the headquarters of his castra, the courthouse (tribunal) of his judiciary, or the city hall of his provincial governorship. (Note: Most moderate-size Latin dictionaries list the praetorial nouns and adjectives, and uses and major sources.) The minimum age for holding the praetorship was 39 during the Roman Republic, but it was later changed to 30 in the early Empire.

== History of the title ==
The status of the praetor in the early republic is unclear. The traditional account from Livy claims that the praetorship was created by the Sextian-Licinian Rogations in 367 BC, but it was well known both to Livy and other Romans in the late republic that the chief magistrates were first called praetor. For example, Festus "refers to 'the praetors, who are now consuls'".

The form of the republic changed substantially over its history and the accounts of the republic's development in the early imperial period are marred with anachronisms projecting then-current practices into the past. In the earliest periods of the republic, praetor "may not have meant anything more than leader in the most basic sense", deriving from praeire (to proceed) or praeesse (to be preeminent). These early praetors may have simply been clan leaders leading "military forces privately and free from state control" with a multitude of private leaders leading private armies.

These early military leaders were eventually institutionalised into fixed magistrate bodies elected by the people with clear state control over military activities. This was also probably assisted by "the use of recuperatores to mediate disputes and fetial priests to control the declaration of war". The effect to make it more difficult for private individuals to start wars against Rome's neighbours. Reforms in 449 BC also may have required "for the first time that all military commanders be confirmed by a popular assembly [representing] the Roman people".

The emergence of the classical praetorship was a long process that had been underway by 367 BC. This was when the Sextian-Licinian Rogations were passed, giving the Roman people substantially more power over the selection of their military commanders. While Livy claims that the rogations created the praetorship in 367 BC to relieve the consuls of their judicial responsibilities, "few modern historians would accept [this] account as written". Beyond the ancient knowledge that a title of praetor dated to the beginning of the republic, what became the classical praetorship was initially a military office with imperium and "virtually identical in authority and capacity to the consulship". Furthermore, a fully-formed praetorship without colleague, as Livy's account implies, would be a "tremendous violation of Roman practice in which all regular magistracies were created in colleges consisting of at least two".

"Scholars increasingly view the [rogations] as establishing a college of three (and only three) praetors, two of whom eventually developed into the historical consuls". What became the classical praetorship in its early years also was not viewed as being less than the consuls, as "it was common practice for men to hold the praetorship after a consulship... since [doing so] was simply a method of holding imperium for a second year".

Livy reports that until 337 BC the praetor was chosen only from among the patricians. In that year, eligibility for the praetura was opened to the plebeians, and one of them, Quintus Publilius Philo, won the office.

Only in the 125 years after the election of three military leaders did a clear distinction emerge between what became the consuls and what became the praetors due to the "normal Roman practice to reserve one commander in or near the city for purposes of defence and (eventually) for civilian administration". The glory and prestige won by the praetors fighting foreign wars, then still in Italy, is what led to the higher prestige of the consulship. Only in 180 BC with the passage of the lex Villia annalis was holding the praetorship after the consulship prohibited. Even after the consulship emerged from the praetorship with higher prestige and desirability, praetorian imperium was still not legally distinct (or inferior to consular imperium) until the very end of the republic.

Starting in 241 BC, praetors started to be prorogued, allowing former praetors to act in the place of a praetor (ie pro praetore) with power only "to conduct war in his assigned provincia [with] no other concerns or duties". Prorogation, in effect, granted private individuals a legally fictitious power to act in the place of the normal magistrates, allowing them to continue to act within their assigned task (provincia). Prorogation allowed a magistrate, whose imperium did not expire with his term until crossing the pomerium or being stripped by the people, to continue in his assigned task or provincia.

== Praetura ==
The elected praetor was a curule magistrate, exercised imperium, and consequently was one of the magistratus majores. He had the right to sit in the sella curulis and wear the toga praetexta. He was attended by six lictors. A praetor was a magistrate with imperium within his own sphere, subject only to the veto of the consuls (who outranked him).

The potestas and imperium (legal powers and military command, respectively) of the consuls and the praetors under the Republic should not be exaggerated. They did not use independent judgment in resolving matters of state. Unlike today's executive branches, they were assigned high-level tasks directly by senatorial decree under the authority of the SPQR.

Livy describes the assignments given to either consuls or praetors in some detail. As magistrates, they had standing duties to perform, especially of a religious nature. However, a consul or praetor could be taken away from his current duties at any time to head a task force, and there were many, especially military. Livy mentions that, among other tasks, these executive officers were told to lead troops against perceived threats (domestic or foreign), investigate possible subversion, raise troops, conduct special sacrifices, distribute windfall money, appoint commissioners and even exterminate locusts. Praetors could delegate at will. The one principle that limited what could be assigned to them was that their duties must not concern them with minima, "little things". They were by definition doers of maxima. This principle of Roman law became a principle of later European law: Non curat minima praetor, that is, the details do not need to be legislated, they can be left up to the courts.

== Praetors and their duties ==
=== Republican ===
A second praetorship was created around 241 BC, more clearly separating this office from that of the consulship. There were two reasons for this: to relieve the weight of judicial business and to give the Republic a magistrate with imperium who could field an army in an emergency when both consuls were fighting a far-off war.

==== Praetor peregrinus ====
By the end of the First Punic War, a fourth magistrate entitled to hold imperium appears, the praetor qui inter peregrinos ius dicit ("the praetor who administers justice among foreigners"). Although in the later Empire the office was titled praetor inter cives et peregrinos ("among citizens and foreigners", that is, having jurisdiction in disputes between citizens and noncitizens), by the time of the 3rd century BC, Rome's territorial annexations and foreign populations were unlikely to require a new office dedicated solely to this task. T. Corey Brennan, in his two-volume study of the praetorship, argues that during the military crisis of the 240s the second praetorship was created to make another holder of imperium available for command and provincial administration inter peregrinos. During the Hannibalic War, the praetor peregrinus was frequently absent from Rome on special missions. The urban praetor more often remained in the city to administer the judicial system.

==== Praetor urbanus ====
The praetor urbanus presided in civil cases between citizens. The Senate required that some senior officer remain in Rome at all times. This duty now fell to the praetor urbanus. In the absence of the consuls, he was the senior magistrate of the city, with the power to summon the Senate and to organize the defense of the city in the event of an attack. He was not allowed to leave the city for more than ten days at a time. He was therefore given appropriate duties in Rome. He superintended the Ludi Apollinares and was also the chief magistrate for the administration of justice and promulgated the Praetor's Edict. These Edicts were statements of praetor's policy as to judicial decisions to be made during his term of office. The praetor had substantial discretion regarding his Edict, but could not legislate. In a sense the continuing Edicts came to form a corpus of precedents. The development and improvement of Roman Law owes much to the wise use of this praetorial discretion.

==== Additional praetors ====
The expansion of Roman authority over other lands required the addition of praetors. Two were created in 227 BC, for the administration of Sicily and Sardinia, and two more when the two Hispanic provinces were formed in 197 BC. The dictator Lucius Cornelius Sulla transferred administration of the provinces to former consuls and praetors, simultaneously increasing the number of praetors elected each year to eight, as part of his constitutional reforms. Julius Caesar raised the number to ten, then fourteen, and finally to sixteen. (Note: In the late Republic the census was discovering a population of the city of Rome numbering in the millions.)

=== Imperial ===
Augustus made changes that were designed to reduce the Praetor to being an imperial administrator rather than a magistrate. The electoral body was changed to the Senate, which was now an instrument of imperial ratification. To take a very simplistic view, the establishment of the principate can be seen as the restoration of monarchy under another name. The Emperor therefore assumed the powers once held by the kings, but he used the apparatus of the republic to exercise them. For example, the emperor presided over the highest courts of appeal.

The need for administrators remained just as acute. After several changes, Augustus fixed the number at twelve. Under Tiberius, there were sixteen. As imperial administrators, their duties extended to matters that the republic would have considered minima. Two praetors were appointed by Claudius for matters relating to Fideicommissa (trusts), when the business in that department of the law had become considerable, but Titus reduced the number to one; and Nerva added a Praetor for the decision of matters between the fiscus (treasury) and individuals. Marcus Aurelius appointed a Praetor for matters relating to tutela (guardianship).

== Praetors as judges ==
Roman court cases fell into the two broad categories of civil or criminal trials. The involvement of a Praetor in either was as follows.

=== Actions ===
In an actio, which was civil, the Praetor could either issue an interdictum (interdict) forbidding some circumstance or appoint a iudex (judge). Proceedings before the praetor were technically said to be in iure. At this stage, the Praetor would establish a formula directing the iudex as to the remedy to be given if he found that certain circumstances were satisfied; for instance, "Let X be iudex. If it appears that the defendant ought to pay 10,000 sesterces to the plaintiff, let the iudex condemn the defendant to pay 10,000 sesterces to the plaintiff. If it does not so appear, let the plaintiff absolve him." After they were handed over to the iudex, they were no longer in iure before the Praetor, but apud iudicem. The iudicium of the iudex was binding. By the time of Diocletian, however, this two-stage process had largely disappeared, and the Praetor would either hear the whole case in person or appoint a delegate (a iudex pedaneus), taking steps for the enforcement of the decision; the formula was replaced by an informal system of pleadings.

During the time of the Roman Republic, the Urban Praetor allegedly issued an annual edict, usually on the advice of jurists (since the Praetor himself was not necessarily educated in the law), setting out the circumstances under which he would grant remedies. The legal provisions arising from the Praetor's Edict were known as ius honorarium; in theory the Praetor did not have power to alter the law, but in practice the Edict altered the rights and duties of individuals and was effectively a legislative document. In the reign of Hadrian, however, the terms of the Edict were made permanent and the Praetor's de facto legislative role was abolished.

=== Quaestiones perpetuae ===
The Praetors also presided at the quaestiones perpetuae (which were criminal proceedings), so-called because they stood in constant session instead of being enacted as ad hoc proceedings, which were the norm in previous time periods. The Praetors appointed judges who acted as jurors in voting for guilt or innocence. The verdict was either acquittal or condemnation.

These quaestiones looked into crimina publica, "crimes against the public", such as were worthy of the attention of a Praetor. The penalty on conviction was usually death, but it was easily avoidable by going into exile. In the late Republic, the public crimes were:

- Repetundae (Note: Approximately "remedy", the seeking of restitution of property taken illegally by a magistrate and conviction of the perpetrator. Example: an illegal confiscation.)
- Ambitus (Note: "Canvassing", an attempt to influence voters illegally. Example: buying votes.)
- Majestas (Note: Against the "majesty" of the people; that is, treason. Example: plotting the murder of a magistrate.)
- Peculatus (Note: "Embezzlement", the theft of public property. Example: the misappropriation of public money.)
- Falsum (Note: "False witness"; i.e., against perjurers.)
- De Sicariis et Veneficis (Note: "Concerning stabbers and poisoners"; i.e., against professional assassins and their collaborators.)
- De Parricidis (Note: "Parricide", extended to the murder of relatives.)
- De Iniuriis

The last three were added by the Dictator Sulla in the early 1st century BC.

== Outdoor actions ==
When the Praetor administered justice in a tribunal, he sat on a sella curulis, which was that part of the court reserved for the Praetor and his assessors and friends, as opposed to the subsellia, the part occupied by the iudices (judges) and others who were present. In court, the Praetor was referred to as acting e tribunali or ex superiore loco (lit. 'from a raised platform' or 'from a higher place') but he could also perform ministerial acts out of court, in which case he was said to be acting e plano or ex aequo loco (lit. 'from the flat ground' or 'from an equal/level place'). For instance, he could in certain cases give validity to the act of manumission when he was out-of-doors, such as on his way to the bath or to the theatre.

== Later Roman era ==
By 395 AD, the praetors' responsibilities had been reduced to a purely municipal role. Their sole duty was to manage the spending of money on the exhibition of games or on public works. However, with the decline of the other traditional Roman offices such as that of tribune, the praetorship remained an important portal through which aristocrats could gain access to either the Western or Eastern senates. The praetorship was a costly position to hold as praetors were expected to possess a treasury from which they could draw funds for their municipal duties.

== Byzantine Empire ==
Like many other Roman institutions, the praetor (Greek: πραίτωρ, praitōr) survived in the Eastern Roman Empire.

Emperor Justinian I (r. 527–565) undertook a major administrative reform beginning in 535, which involved the reunification of civil and military authority in the hands of the governor in certain provinces, and the abolition of the dioceses. The Diocese of Thrace had already been abolished by the end of the 5th century by Anastasius, and its vicarius became the new praetor Justinianus of Thrace, with authority over all the former Thracian provinces except for Lower Moesia and Scythia Minor, which became part of the quaestura exercitus. Similarly, the governors of Pisidia and Lycaonia, as well as Paphlagonia (enlarged by merging it with Honorias) were upgraded to praetores Justiniani, and received the rank of vir spectabilis. In addition, in Constantinople he replaced the praefectus vigilum, who was hitherto responsible for security, by a praetor populi (in Greek πραίτωρ [τῶν] δήμων, praitōr [tōn] dēmōn), with wide-ranging police powers.

In the early 9th century, the praitōr was a junior administrative official in the themata, subordinate to the governing stratēgos. Gradually however, the civil functionaries assumed greater power, and by the late 10th century, the praitores (or kritai, "judges") were placed at the head of the civil administration of a thema. This division of civil and military duties was often abandoned in the 12th century, when the posts of civil praitōr and military doux were frequently held in tandem. The provincial post fell out of use after the collapse of the Empire in 1204.

According to Helene Ahrweiler, Emperor Nikephoros II (r. 963–969) reinstituted a praetor in Constantinople, as a high-ranking judge. He is possibly identical to the Palaiologan-era post of the praitōr tou demōu, whose holders are attested until 1355. According to the Book of Offices of pseudo-Kodinos, compiled around the same time, the praitōr tou demōu occupied the 38th place in the imperial hierarchy, between the megas tzaousios and the logothetēs tōn oikeiakōn, but held no official function. His court uniform consisted of a gold-brocaded hat (skiadion), a plain silk kabbadion tunic, and a plain, smooth wooden staff (dikanikion).

== Modern era ==
Classical Latin Praetor became medieval Latin Pretor; Praetura, Pretura, etc. During the interwar period the 71 counties of Romania were divided into a various numbers of plăși (singular: plasă), headed by a Pretor, appointed by the Prefect. The institution headed by the Pretor was called Pretură. Currently, this office has survived only in the Republic of Moldova, where praetors are the heads of Chişinău's five sectors.

In Italy, until 1998, Praetor was a magistrate with particular duty (especially in civil branch).

The Italian-speaking Swiss canton of Ticino has pretori (singular: pretore) which is the chief magistrate (civil branch) of a district, heading a pretura (a court). The pretori are appointed by the canton's parliament.

== See also ==
- List of Praetors of the Roman Republic
- Category:Roman praetors
- Praetor's Edict
- List of topics related to ancient Rome
- Constitution of the Roman Republic
- Political institutions of Rome

== Sources ==
- Brennan, T. Corey (2000). The Praetorship in the Roman Republic. Vol. 2. Oxford University Press. pp. 357–972. ISBN 0-19-513867-8.
- Bury, John Bagnell (1923). History of the Later Roman Empire: From the Death of Theodosius I to the Death of Justinian. London: MacMillan & Co.
- Drogula, Fred (2015). Commanders & command in the Roman Republic and Early Empire. Chapel Hill: University of North Carolina Press. ISBN 978-1-4696-2314-6. OCLC 905949529.
- Kazhdan, Alexander, ed. (1991). The Oxford Dictionary of Byzantium. Oxford and New York: Oxford University Press. ISBN 0-19-504652-8.
- McCullough, Colleen (1990). The First Man in Rome. Avon Books. ISBN 0-380-71081-1.
- Nicholas, Barry (1975). An Introduction to Roman Law. Oxford University Press. ISBN 0-19-876063-9.
- Verpeaux, Jean, ed. (1966). Pseudo-Kodinos, Traité des Offices (in French). Centre National de la Recherche Scientifique.
- Watson, Alan (1974). Law making in the later Roman Republic. Oxford University Press.
- Wesenberg, Gerhard (1954). "Praetor". Realencyclopädie der Classischen Altertumswissenschaft. Band XXII, Halbband 44, Praefectura-Priscianus. cols. 1582–1606.
