= Álvaro d'Ors Pérez-Peix =

Spanish academic

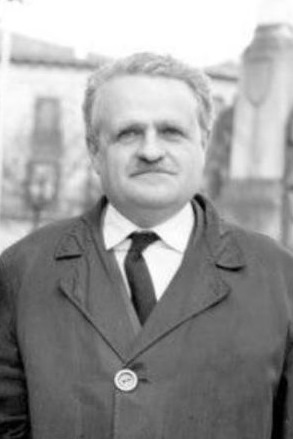
- Born: Álvaro d'Ors Pérez-Peix; 14 April 1915; Barcelona, Spain
- Died: 1 February 2004 (aged 88); Pamplona, Spain
- Occupation: academic
- Known for: scholar of law, political theorist
- Political party: Carlism

Álvaro Jordi d'Ors Pérez-Peix (14 April 1915 – 1 February 2004) was a Spanish scholar of Roman law, currently considered one of the best 20th-century experts on the field; he served as professor at the universities of Santiago de Compostela and Pamplona. He was also theorist of law and political theorist, responsible for development of Traditionalist vision of state and society. Politically he supported the Carlist cause. Though he did not hold any official posts within the organization, he counted among top intellectuals of the movement; he was member of the advisory council of the Carlist claimant.

== Family and youth ==
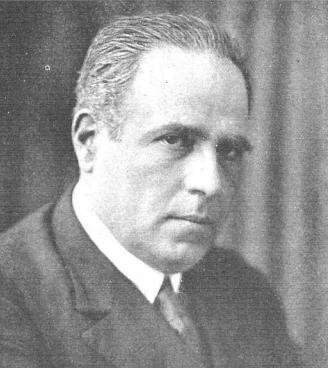
father

The Ors family has been for centuries related to Catalonia, its origins traced back to Lerida. The great-grandfather of Álvaro, Joan Ors Font, was the native of Sabadell; his son and Álvaro's paternal grandfather, José Ors Rosal, settled in Barcelona and since the 1880s he practiced as doctor in the Santa Creu hospital. He married a girl from an enriched indiano family, born in Cuba though related to Vilafranca del Penedès. Their son and the father of Álvaro, Eugenio Ors Rovira (1881-1954), in the 1910s emerged among protagonists of cultural life in Catalonia; he later changed his surname to d’Ors. In the 1920s he grew to nationally recognized figure as publisher, essayist, art critic, writer and philosopher; in the Francoist Spain he held high jobs related to culture. Currently he is considered one of key representatives of late Spanish Modernism and Catalan cultural renaissance. In 1906 he married María Pérez Peix (1879-1972), daughter to a successful textile business entrepreneur from Barcelona; a cultured person with artistic penchant, she tried her hand in music, dance, guitar, photography and especially sculpture.

The couple settled in Barcelona; they had three children, all of them sons; Álvaro was born as the youngest one. He was raised in luxurious and bohemian atmosphere, since childhood traveling extensively abroad due to professional assignments of his father; in 1922 the family moved to Madrid. First educated by his mother, in 1923-1932 he frequented Instituto-Escuela, an establishment known for its liberal profile; it is there he obtained the baccalaureate. In 1932 d’Ors enrolled at law and in 1933 at philosophy and letters. Outbreak of the Civil War caught him at the family estate in Argentona. Fearing repression due to pro-Nationalist stand assumed in Paris by his father, Álvaro opted for self-confinement. In mid-1937, he crossed the Pyrenees and through France, he made it to the Nationalist zone. Drafted to the army he deserted and volunteered to the Carlist troops, serving in requeté units until 1939. Released, the same year he graduated in law and obtained a teaching contract at Universidad Central.

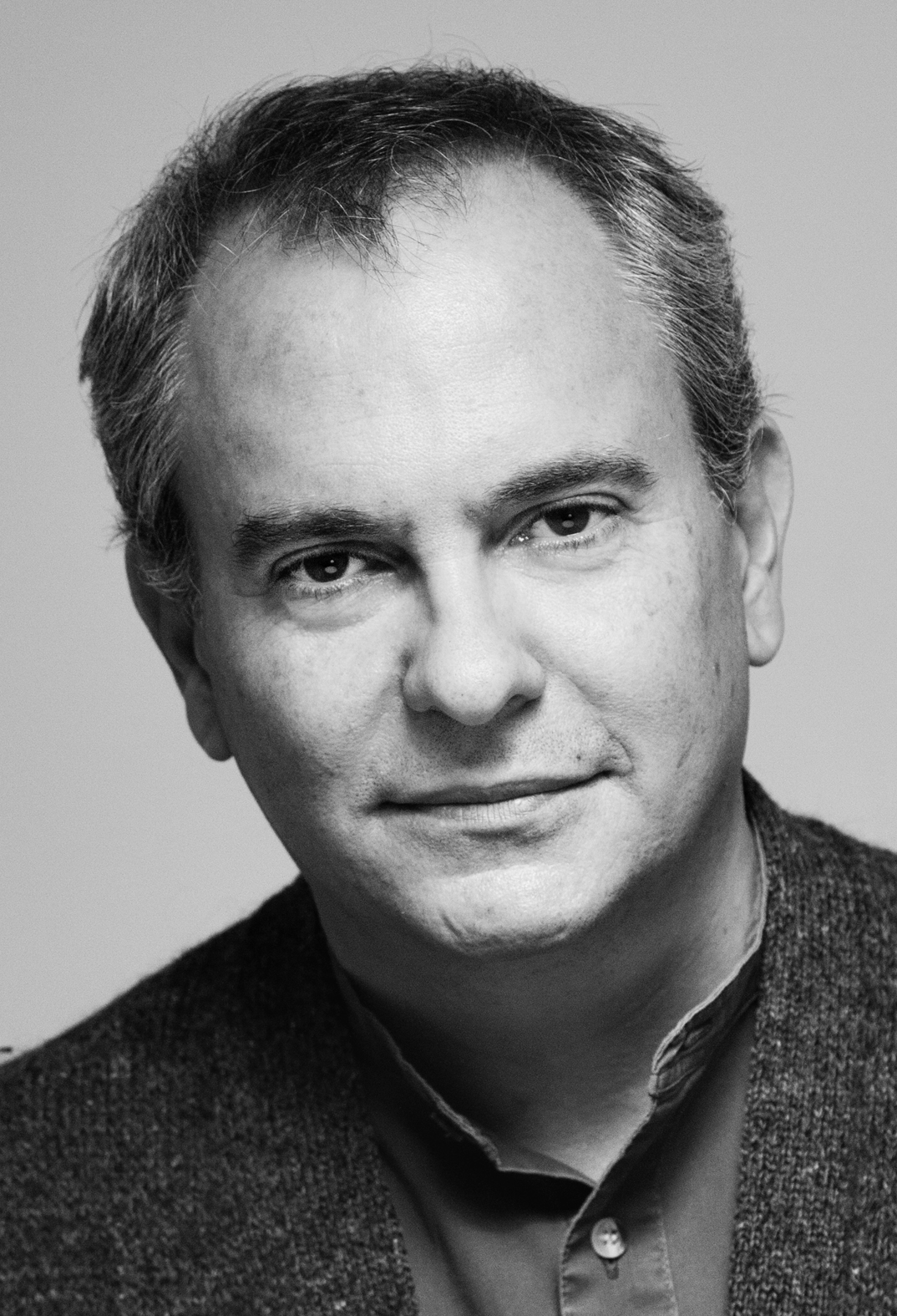
Pablo d'Ors

In 1945 d’Ors married Palmira Lois Estévez (1920-2003), his student and daughter to a local Galician lawyer; until 1961 they lived in Santiago de Compostela, and later on in Pamplona. The couple had 11 children, born between the mid-1940s and the mid-1960s. Three sons became academics: Miguel d’Ors Lois in literature (Pamplona, Granada), though he gained some recognition also as a poet, Javier in law (Santiago, León) and Angel in philosophy (Pamplona, Madrid). Daughters became local editors, historians or art critics; one daughter was mentally impaired and died prematurely. The best known of d’Ors’ grandchildren are Laura d’Ors Vilardebo, a photographer and art critic, and Diego d’Ors Vilardebó, a musician. Among Álvaro's nephews, a Catholic priest Pablo d’Ors Führer is a writer and Juan d’Ors Führer a musician. Both Álvaro's brothers served as requetés and one in Division Azul in Russia; Víctor gained some nationwide recognition as an architect and author of related books.

== Academic career ==
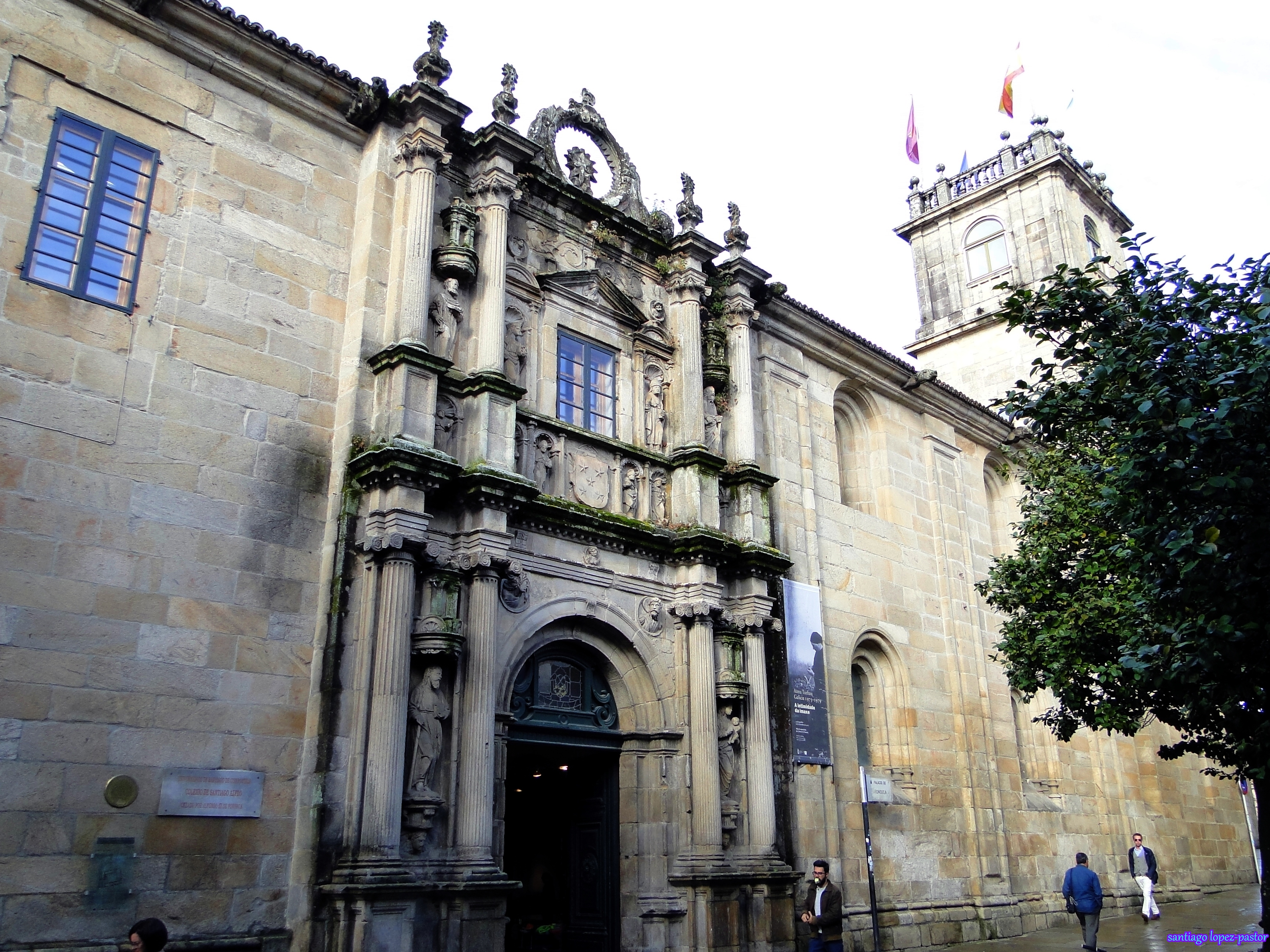
Santiago University (present view)

D’Ors’ first academic teaching contract is dated 1939; he obtained an auxiliary position at the chair of Roman law in Madrid. In 1940 he left for Italy, where under the guidance of Emilio Albertario d’Ors pursued research related to his PhD dissertation. It materialized as a thesis on Constitutio Antoniniana, accepted cum laude at Universidad Central in 1941. Following vacancies at the chairs of Roman law in Granada and Las Palmas he applied and emerged successful over two counter-candidates. Entitled to choose his seat he opted for Granada, where d’Ors was teaching Roman law in 1943–1944. In 1944 he swooped chairs and moved to Universidad de Santiago de Compostela, the institution he co-operated with since the early 1940s.

In addition to Roman law, d'Ors was periodically teaching Civil Law and History of Law; in the late 1940s, he held the job of Library Director of the University of Santiago. During his Santiago spell he was also heading the library of the School of Law. In 1948 he commenced long-lasting co-operation with University of Coimbra. In 1953 he was nominated head of the Vatican-based Istituto Giuridico Spagnolo; until 1973 d’Ors would lead its works. Though he felt very well in Santiago, in 1960 and reportedly due to influence of José María Escriva d’Ors moved to the newly set up University of Navarra, a corporate work of Opus Dei. Since 1961 for the following 24 years he continued as chair of Roman law; until 1972 he served also as Library Director and was responsible for setting up and managing the School of Librarians. Though in the early 1980s he was pondering upon return to Santiago he retired in Pamplona in 1985; until 1989 he contributed as professor emeritus and until death as honorary professor.

Apart from strictly academic institutions, in the 1940s d’Ors was active in Centro de Estudios Históricos, Instituto Nacional de Estudios Jurídicos, Instituto Nebrija de Estudios Clásicos, and in Consejo Superior de Investigaciones Científicas. During long spells he remained in editorial boards of numerous periodicals, notably Emerita, Anuario de Historia del Derecho Español, Revista de Estudios Histórico-Jurídicos, Revue Internationale des Droits de l’Antiquité and Studia et Documenta. D’Ors was member of numerous scientific organisations in Spain and abroad. He kept writing throughout all his life; it is estimated that d’Ors wrote some 600–800 academic publications, plus thousands of op-eds and other pieces.

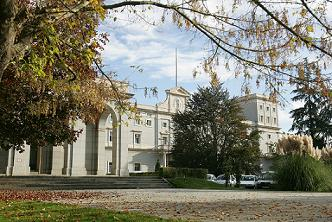
University of Navarre (present view)

There are conflicting views on d’Ors’ didactical profile. The prevailing one is that though very diligent and ideologically uncompromising, as a colleague and mentor d’Ors remained extremely fair and very respectful towards his assistants and students. Perhaps even tending to excess benevolence, he allowed them a great deal of research liberty. According to his son, he had no personal enemies and never embarked on personal charges. However, a competitive view is that the above seems highly debatable, that he was very lenient only towards his disciples while remaining intransigent if not hostile towards those considered opponents, and that his judgment was seriously impaired by ideological fanaticism.

== Roman law scholar ==
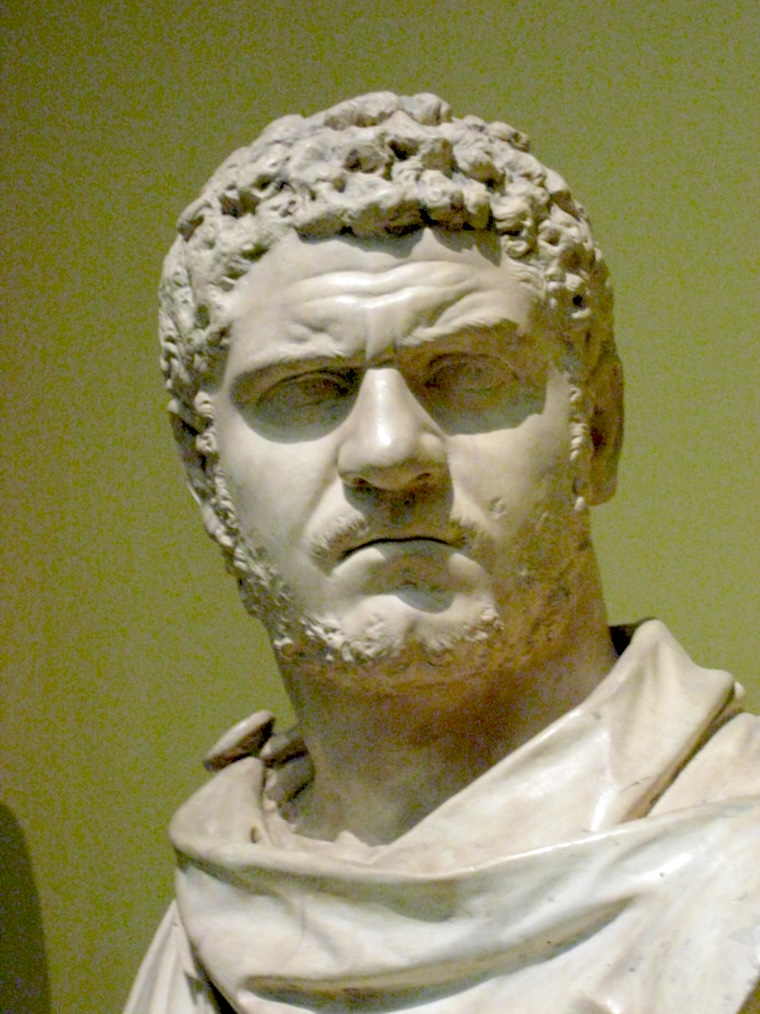
Caracalla

Though d’Ors remained active on many scholarly fields, he considered himself and is most appreciated today as a Roman law scholar. His interest in ancient Rome originated from juvenile visits in the British Museum, but was later cultivated and developed by his academic masters José Castillejo and Ursicino Alvarez. He also admitted masterly influence of Theodor Mommsen, Otto Lenel, Leopold Wenger, Emilio Albertario; the peers he was indebted to were mostly Max Kaser and Franz Wieacker.

In terms of specific issues tackled, chronologically the first was the problem of Roman citizenship regulations; d’Ors offered a new view of Edict of Caracalla and challenged the previously dominating, so-called interpolationist theory. Another thread of his research was contractual agreements, and particularly credit; d’Ors questioned the fourfold classification of contracts and emphasized their bilateral nature. Throughout his career he dedicated much attention to municipal law, especially during the Flavian era. D'Ors also focused on the reconstruction of the praetor's edicts, improving thus earlier reconstructions offered by Adolf Friedrich Rudorff and Otto Lenel. He dedicated much work to Visigothic law, pursuing a territorialist thesis against personalism of Germanic law. Last but not least, he offered an extensive analysis of the juridical thought of the Roman jurist Sextus Caecilius Africanus.

Methodologically, d’Ors advocated much stricter and rigorous approach related to source criticism, especially concerning Roman legal sources; this view constituted the guiding thread of his research and together with works of Álvarez contributed to a new turn in the research of Roman law in Spain. His own specific approach consisted of particular focus on so far underestimated sources, namely papyrology and epigraphy; in the early 1950s he collected and extensively commented on all known epigraphic fragments related to juridical order in Roman Spain, and later on followed new discoveries, esp. on so-called Lex Flavia and Lex Irnitana in the 1980s.

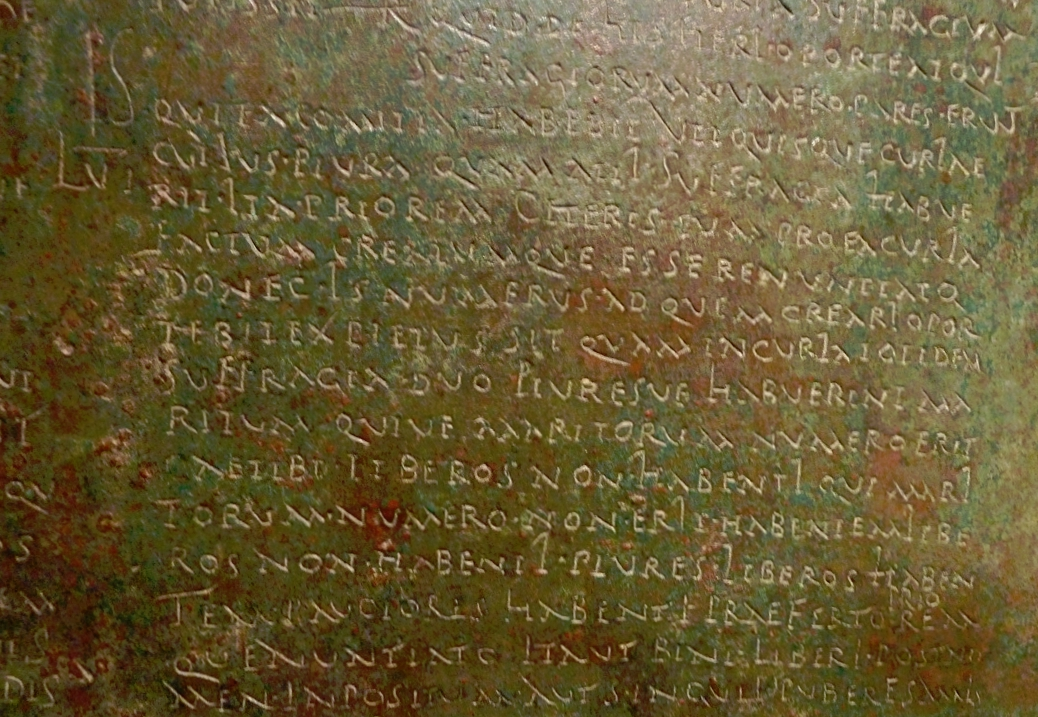
Lex Flavia

The first major work published by d’Ors was Estudios sobre la Constitutio Antoniniana (1943), a multi-volume edition of his Ph.D. dissertation. The same year he released Presupuestos críticos para el Estudio del Derecho Romano, mostly a study on methodology and source criticism. Introducción al estudio de los Documentos del Egipto romano (1948) was relatively minor compared to Epigrafía jurídica de la España romana (1953), by some considered his most important contribution to scholarship on Roman law. In 1960 d’Ors summarized his studies on Visigothic law in his monumental El Código de Eurico (1960). Elementos de Derecho romano (1960) was designed as textbook for students of Roman law, and following some changes re-appeared with 10 re-issues it served generations of Spanish students of law and was last published in 2017. Specific problems or municipal statutes was discussed in La ley Flavia municipal (1986) and Lex Irnitana (1988), while Las “Quaestiones” de Africano (1997) provided an all-round description of judicial ideas of Sextus Caecilius Africanus. The last major work published was a set of essays, Crítica romanística (1999). D’Ors’ lesser works, mostly articles scattered across juridical press, run into the hundreds.

== Theorist of law ==
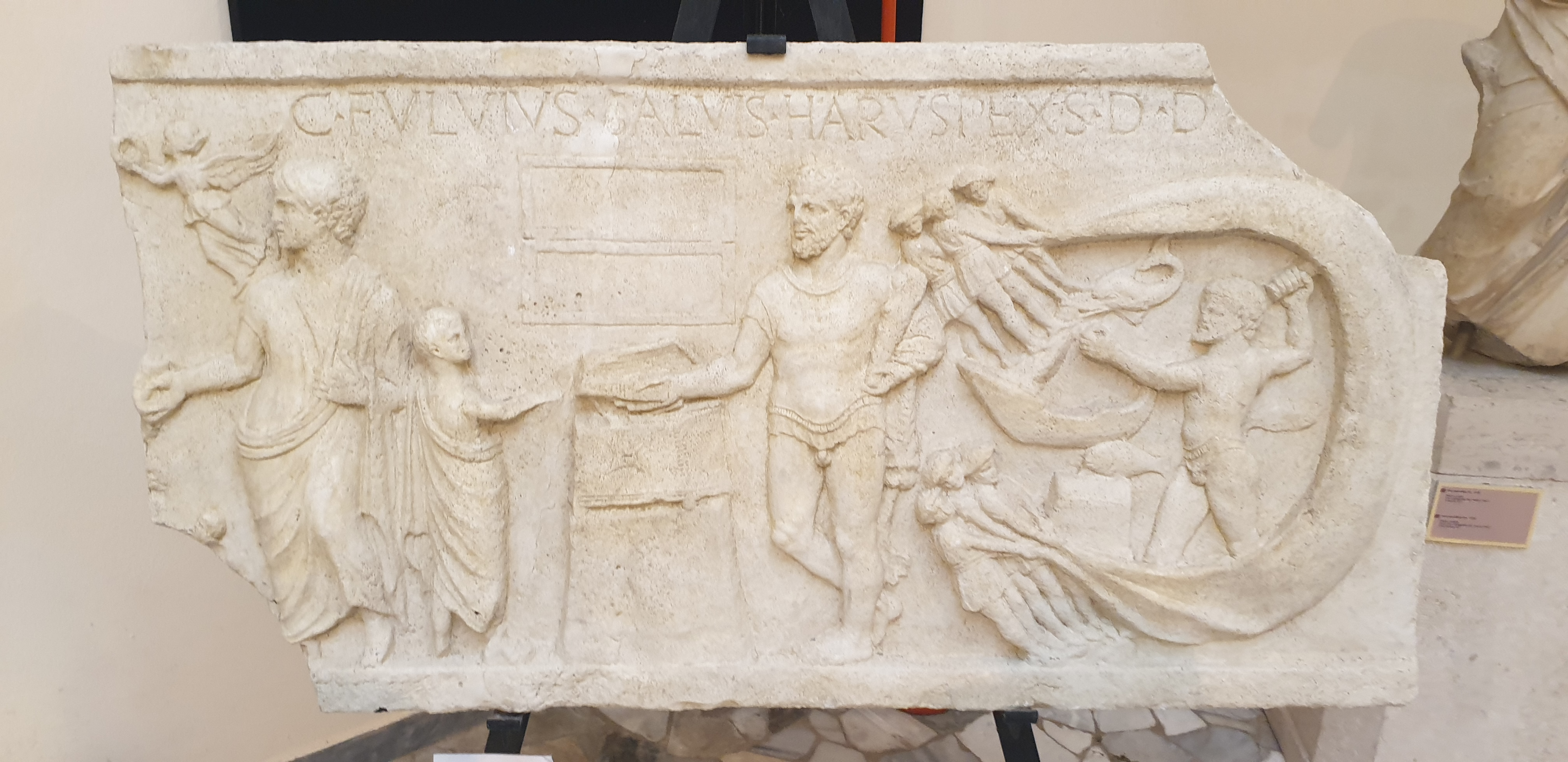
haruspex on duty

D’Ors’ theory of law was founded on distinction between authority (autoridad) and power (poder). Authority is derived from genuine wisdom, and this, in turn, is based not on human assertions, but may be ascertained through tradition and from the natural order, the latter founded on divine rules. Power, in turn, is a ruling structure; it must be based on authority, though it should remain separate from it. This ideal was best embodied in early Roman Republic, but it started to crack when haruspices replaced augurs. The distinction between authority and power was eventually blurred following the rise of Protestantism and ensuing religious wars. Rulers assumed the role of authority; as it was no longer possible to appeal to autoridad against the injustice of poder, the result was the curtailment of liberty.

Another pair was legitimacy (legitimidad, based on ius) and legality (legalidad, based on lex). According to d’Ors, the former is an order stemming from an authority, while the latter is declared by power. The two are not necessarily incompatible; in fact, they should be complementary. However, due to blurred distinction between autoridad and poder, natural law was challenged by positive law. D’Ors confronted the law which claimed to be tantamount to legitimacy. To him, the legal system produced by contractual and/or voluntarist concept was by default flawed, as he declared “social contract” and “will of the people” a myth. One more distinction, only marginally related to the theory of law, was this between ownership (propiedad) and possession (posesión). D’Ors challenged claims raised by modern states as unduly based on abuse of possession; he also confronted the capitalist order, based on the exaltation of property.

A concept related to d’Ors theory of law was violence. He viewed it as an intrinsic part of human history, usually coming to the forefront when an existing order was cracking or collapsing. Since d’Ors at times declared himself to be a “realist,” he considered it in extremis necessary to resolve to violent means, especially when defending natural order against chaos and disorder. In fact, as long as violence was stemming from an authority, it formed part of ius, even in case it was not compatible with lex.

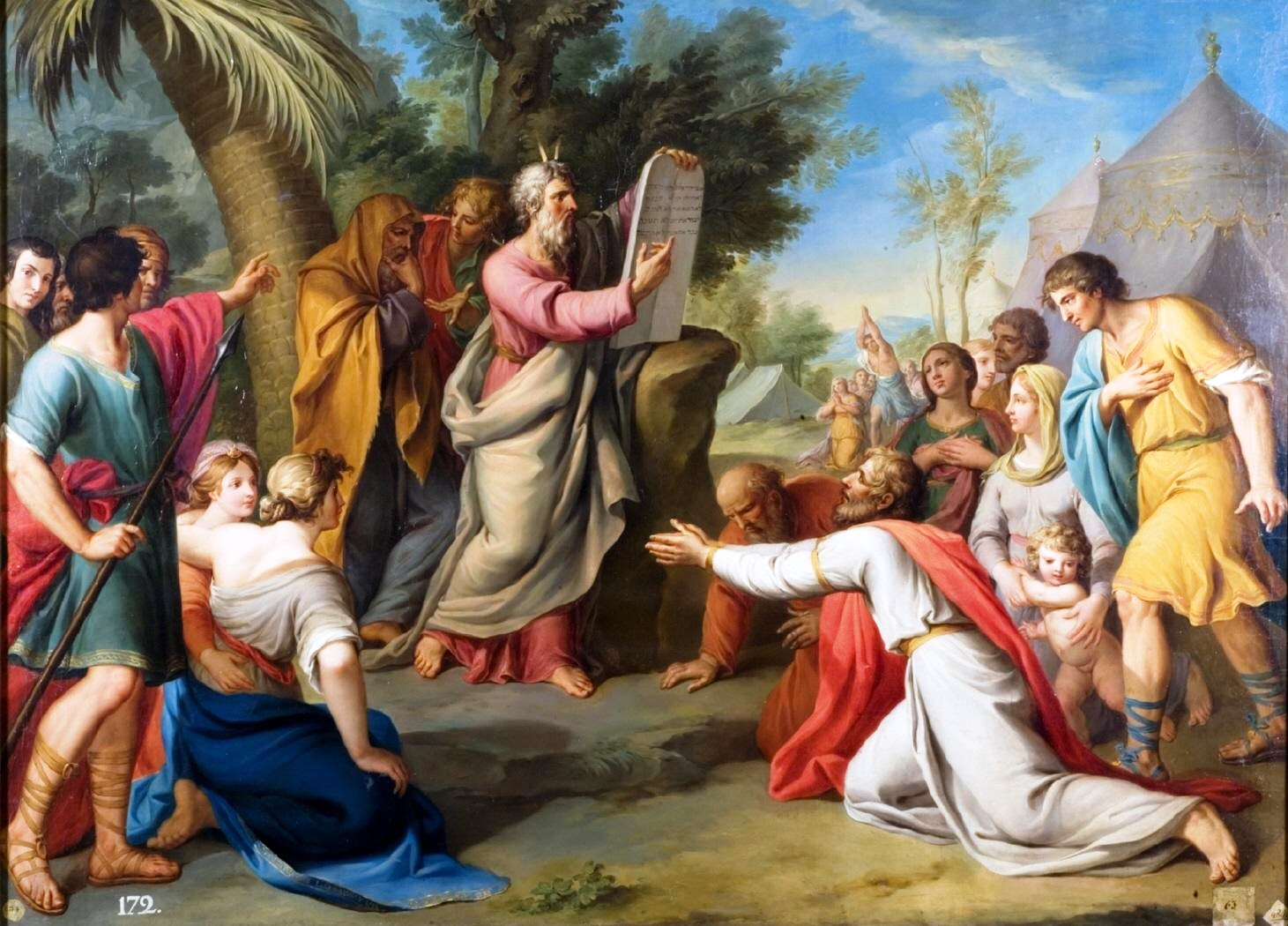
Moses and the Tablets of the Law

D’Ors’ general theory of law is by some named philosophy of law and by others juridical-political philosophy. It is noted that because of its implications, “it is sometimes not easy to distinguish d’Ors's political theory from his legal theory”. In contrast to his romanist teachings, D’Ors theory of law and juridical order has been presented neither in systematic lecture nor structured analysis. It was exposed in numerous press publications, private letters, some paragraphs and sub-chapters in his Roman law works, and above all in essays, most of them collected in separate volumes. The two which stand out are Escritos varios sobre el Derecho en crisis (1973) and Derecho y Sentido Común (1995); some pieces were published in more heterogeneous collections, like Papeles del Oficio Universitario (1961), Nuevos Papeles del Oficio Universitario (1980), Cartas a un joven estudiante (1991), and Parerga histórica (1997).

== Political theorist ==
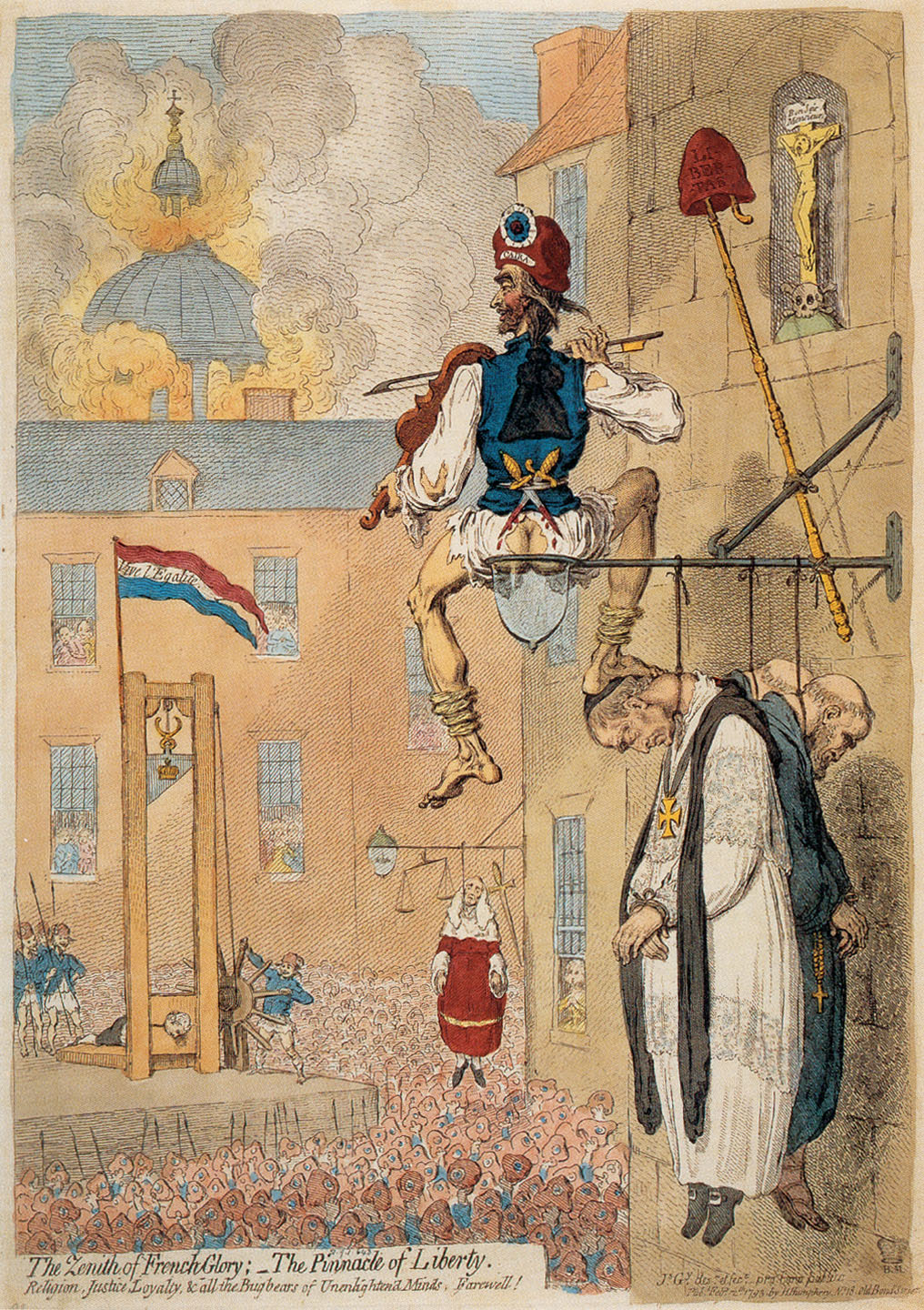
French Revolution in caricature

The cornerstone of d’Ors’ political theory is criticism of modern state. He viewed it as born out of a sovereignty concept constructed in the 16th century and religious wars, enhanced by Absolutism and the French Revolution. This concept was founded on abandoning the distinction between authority and power; its product were mushrooming “artificial” nation-states, which confused ownership with possession. In the late 20th century an alternative solution to obsolete nation-states was a system of “great spaces.” D’Ors was rather vague about them; some commentators compared them to a set of global orders, some to confederations and some to entities resembling the British commonwealth, though all agree that D’Ors subscribed neither to Pax Americana nor to Pax Sovietica concepts. He tried to launch a new science he called "geodieretics," dealing with the organization of territorial order; it differed from geopolitics by discarding the nation state. Instead, it advanced the theory of subsidiarity, viewed as a regulatory principle operating among social bodies.

D’Ors’ recipe for organizing human communities is described as “counter-revolutionary trinomy.” Equality is replaced with legitimity, based on family, natural law, and divine Revelation as the source of truth. Liberty is replaced by responsibility, founded on personal identity, law, and concept of service. Brotherhood is replaced with fatherhood, this one rooted in authority, wisdom, public good, and order. Contemporary scholars list 32 building blocks of the Orsian order, among them, the exaltation of tradition, “political verticalism,” piety, Christianity, religious unity, monarchy, authority, collectivism and violence, and de-emphasizing of reason, democracy, parliamentarism, nationalism, capitalism and others.

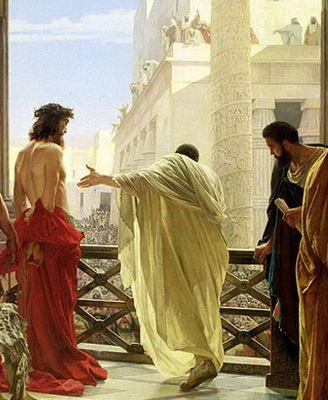
democracy at work; Ecce homo by Ciseri

Some historians name d’Ors a Francoist ideologue. It is underlined that his legitimization of violence and exaltation of the Crusade served the regime perfectly, that he was exponent of the caudillaje theory, that his focus on strong executive and religion supported the mix of nacional-catolicismo, that he advocated “democracía orgánica” and that after death of the dictator, he judged him favorably. Other scholars claim that d’Ors supported Francoism as long as the regime remained rooted in traditional values and opposed its revolutionary syndicalist current, that he worked to make Traditionalism the core of Francoist ideology, and that he formed the group which challenged statolatrian penchant of the regime. It is also noted that after 1975, d’Ors confronted the continental order as formed by the Germany-dominated EEC and the world order as dominated by the United States, both devoted to “consumismo capitalista”; he was increasingly bitter about Spain becoming prey of global capitalism.

D’Ors did not produce a synthetic work exposing his political theory, which he viewed as “teología política”. It was presented mostly in numerous essays, scattered across various press titles and partially re-published in separate collections. Some of them formed part of books devoted to law; those which covered politics are De la guerra y la paz (1954), Forma de gobierno y legitimidad familiar (1963), Ensayos de Teoría Política (1979), La violencia y el orden (1987), Parerga histórica (1997), La posesión del espacio (1998), and Bien común y Enemigo Público (2002).

== Foralist, canonist and taxonomist ==
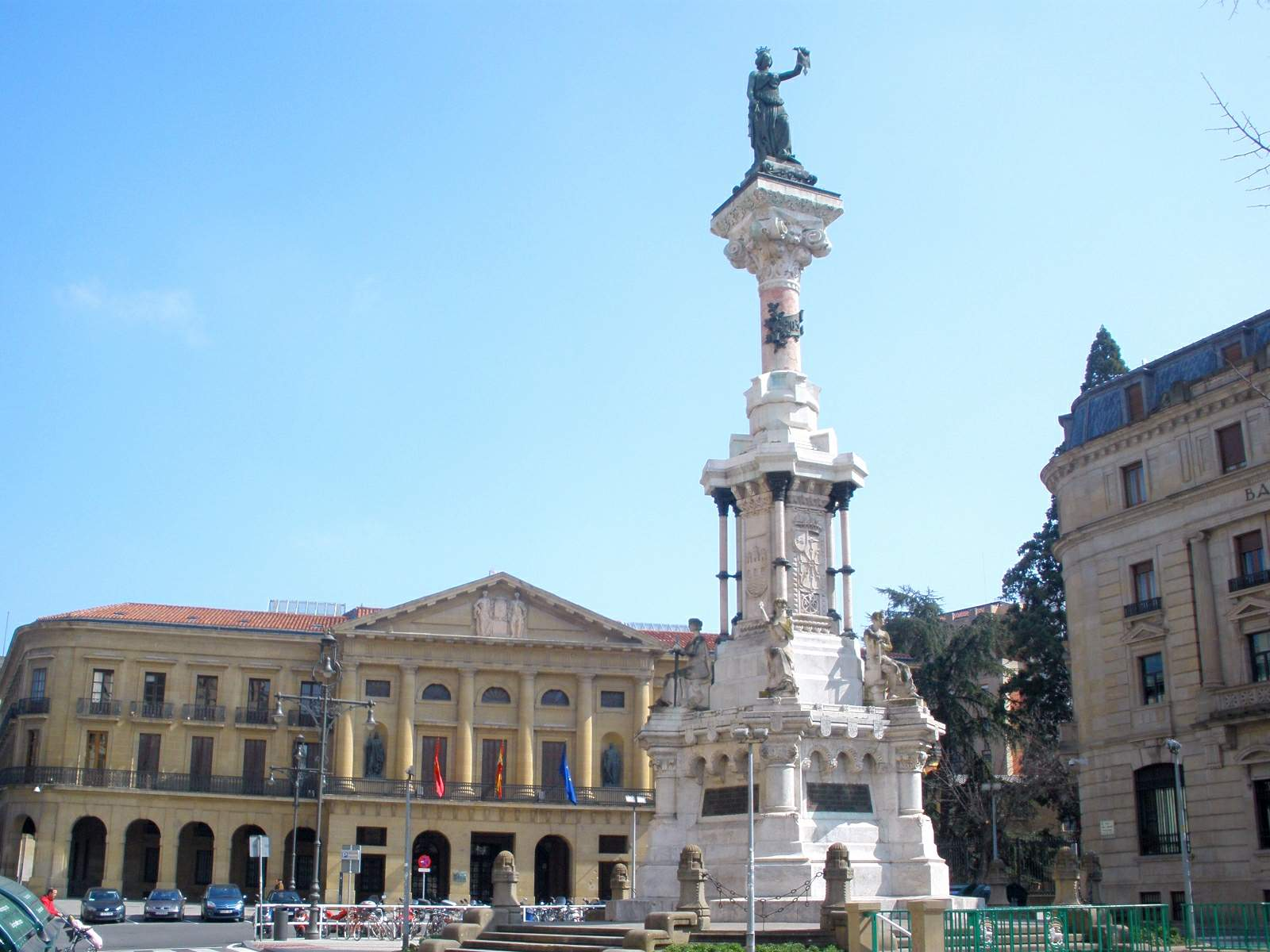
monument to Fueros, Pamplona

Throughout most of his academic career, d’Ors pursued his interest in specific local legal establishments known as fueros, related to municipalities, provinces, and regions. In 1946 he took part in Congreso Nacional de Derecho Civil in Zaragoza, where he delivered a lecture endorsing foral rights; it was indirectly aimed against homogenization and centralization, favored by the Francoist regime. He kept presenting his concept of subsidiarity as a form of foralism in articles, published later on. He advanced the concept systematically since the early 1960, when he entered Comisión Compiladora; it was a team which worked on codification of the Navarrese regional legislation, to be titled Recopilación privada de las leyes del Derecho Civil de Navarra. The labors went on for a few years until their result was published in a series Fuero Nuevo de Navarra (1968-1971), endorsed by Diputación Foral. In line with the Orsian idea, the Navarrese establishments were presented as derived from autoridad and as based on natural law. After the fall of Francoism d’Ors became a member of Consejo de Estudios de Derecho Navarro, entrusted with work on Ley Orgánica de Reintegración y Amejoramiento del Fuero de Navarra; however, in the early 1980s, the draft proposed by the council was rejected by the local self-government. Afterward, D’Ors focused on smaller territorial entities; he helped to complete Ordenanzas del Valle de Salazar, a set of legal establishments specific for a Pyrenean community of the Salazar Valley.

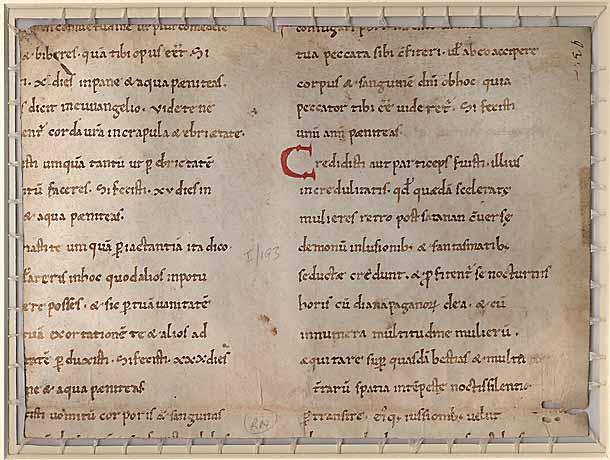
canon law, 11th c.

D’Ors interest in jurisprudence also translated into his focus on canon law; between 1961 and 1985, he served as professor of canon law at the University of Navarra. Promulgation of the new Code of Canon Law in 1983 directed him more specifically towards some legal regulations within the Catholic Church; he was interested mainly in the legal terminology used, as well as in the critical exegesis of the canons in their Latin versions. A few dedicated articles followed; the work was summarized in the revision of the Spanish translation of the Code of Canon Law, edited by Martín Azpilcueta and published by Institute of the University of Navarra (2001). One more and perhaps the most holistic of d’Ors’ academic interests was related to the general classification of sciences, which he developed in the 1960s. Instead of the most widely accepted Diltheian segmentation into natural sciences (Naturwissenschaften) and human sciences (Geisteswissenschaften), he proposed segmentation into Ciencias Humanas, Ciencias Naturales, and Ciencias Geonómicas. Law formed part of the first group; the third one listed grouped disciplines related to organización de la tierra. The attempt was finalized as a multi-volume massive work titled Sistema de las Ciencias (1969).

== Carlist: access and early years ==
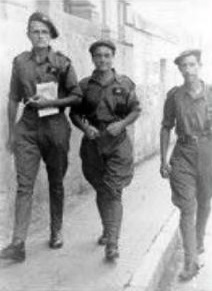
d'Ors (1fL) as requete

Though there were very distant and isolated Carlist antecedents in the Ors family, his parents were members of the modernizing bohemian avant-garde. In his juvenile period, d’Ors entered the same liberal path. In the late 1920s, he co-founded Juventud, an art magazine which remained in the press current “de tono progresista, socializante”. During his academic years d’Ors did not engage politically; following the outbreak of the war he spent the first year reading books. He crossed via France to the Nationalist zone influenced by his father, but having deserted from the army, he felt heavily attracted to volunteer requeté troops. He enlisted to the requeté battalion, Tercio Burgos-Sangüesa; service in this unit and since early 1939 in Tercio de Navarra formed him as a Carlist.

When released from the army in 1939 d’Ors did not engage in politics; having landed the academic job in Santiago in the mid-1940s he resumed his links with local Carlist groups, he did not assume any position in organized structures of the movement. As Carlism was increasingly plagued by internal fragmentation d’Ors did not explicitly back any of the factions. Throughout the 1940s and the 1950s, he rather advanced his Traditionalism as a theorist of law and politics, occasionally confronting excessive Falangist zeal in the academic environment; none of the historiographic studies discussing Carlism of that period mentions his name. His relations with institutional Carlism became closer in the late 1950s. The young entourage of prince Carlos Hugo, at that time just entering the public stage in Spain, turned to the then Santiago academic for support. D’Ors co-drafted the address that the prince was to deliver during the annual Carlist Montejurra rally in 1958; it contained bold references to local fueros, to the idea of subsidiarity, and hinted at the concept of a federative Europe. In 1960 he took part in a semi-ideological conference named Semana de Estudios Tradicionalistas, held in Valle de los Caídos; d’Ors’ lecture was an exposition of his political theory.

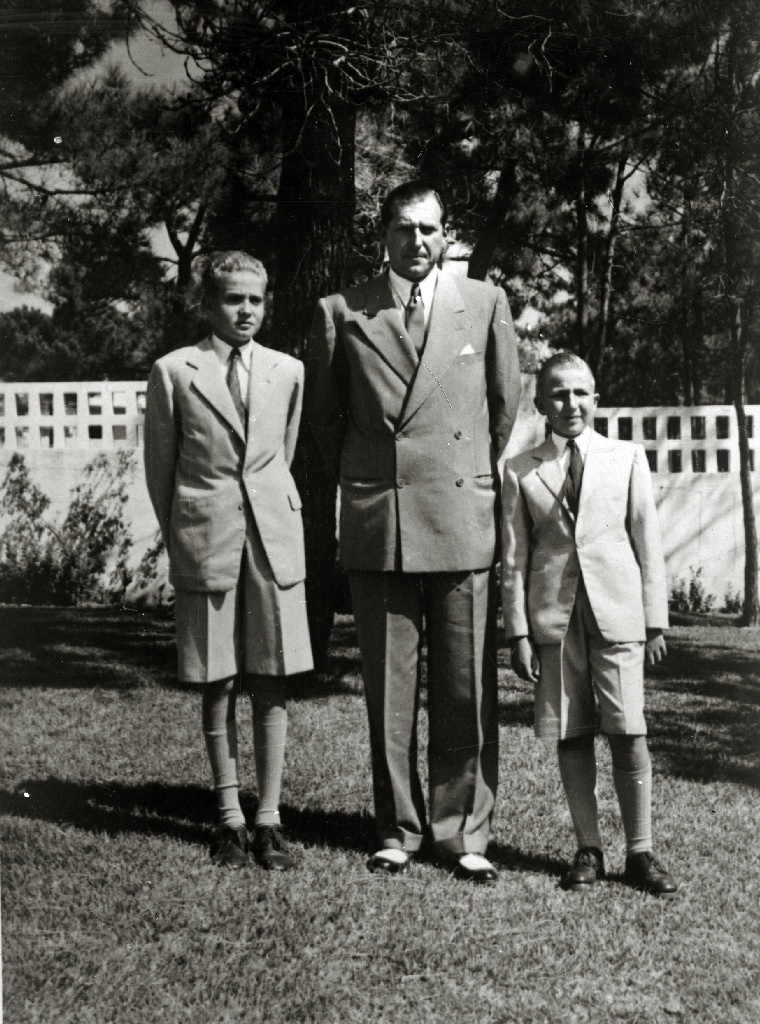
Don Juan with sons, 1950s

At the turn of the decades in public d’Ors was not identified as a Carlist zealot; politicians from the Alfonsist camp considered him their potential ally, especially given his membership in the pro-Juanista Opus Dei. When in 1960 Franco decided that further education of Don Juan Carlos, who had turned 18, should be coordinated by an academic board, the entourage of Don Juan suggested that d’Ors becomes its member. The office of Franco dropped him from the candidates' list. Still, he was reinstated on the insistence of the Alfonsinos. The controversy became pointless as sounded on his membership, D’Ors declined. He pointed out that the only legitimate heir was Don Javier; when pressed, he responded with “lealtad [to the Carlist dynasty] obliga.”

== Carlist: climax ==
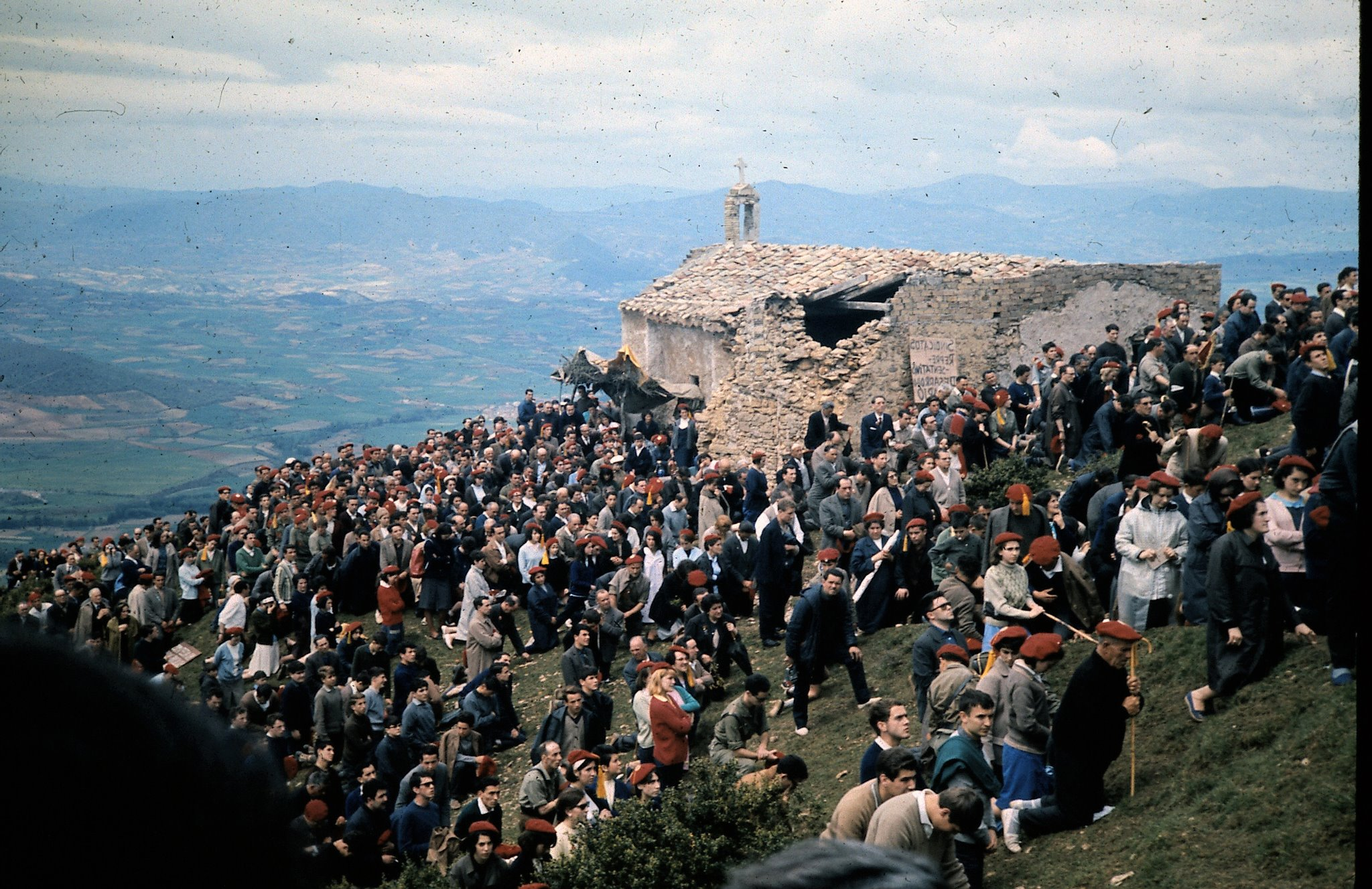
Montejurra rally, 1960s

The early 1960s mark the beginning of d’Ors’ explicit engagement in Carlist labors. In 1962 he co-worked on a document, which legally backed citizenship claims of the Borbón-Parmas; it was presented to Franco during the prince's visit to El Pardo the same year. D’Ors accompanied Don Carlos Hugo at the occasion. However, he was not admitted to the interview. According to his later account until that point, he had genuinely believed that Franco-endorsed coronation of a Carlist pretender was possible; the interview convinced him that it was an illusion, yet he went on to support the Borbón-Parmas, because of his loyalty to the dynasty. There is confusing evidence, though; the same year he developed doubts about Traditionalist credentials of Don Carlos Hugo.

In 1964 d’Ors prepared a set of documents to be agreed during the grand meeting at Puchheim and then attended the meeting, staged the following year. As a legal expert, he elaborated on the legal case of Don Sixto, threatened with expulsion from Spain and later admitted to the Foreign Legion. In 1965 for the only time he spoke during the Montejurra rally; discussing the legitimacy of the Borbón-Parmas, he made a great impact. In 1965 d'Ors was nominated to Junta del Gobierno, in 1966 to the newly established Consejo Asesor de la Jefatura Delegada and in the press he appeared as a member of Junta Nacional. In 1968 he entered another body, Consejo Real; among some 80 candidates, he was among 4 the most-voted. He kept serving as chief legal adviser to Don Javier, e.g., drafting his declaration on the planned Ley Orgánica referendum.

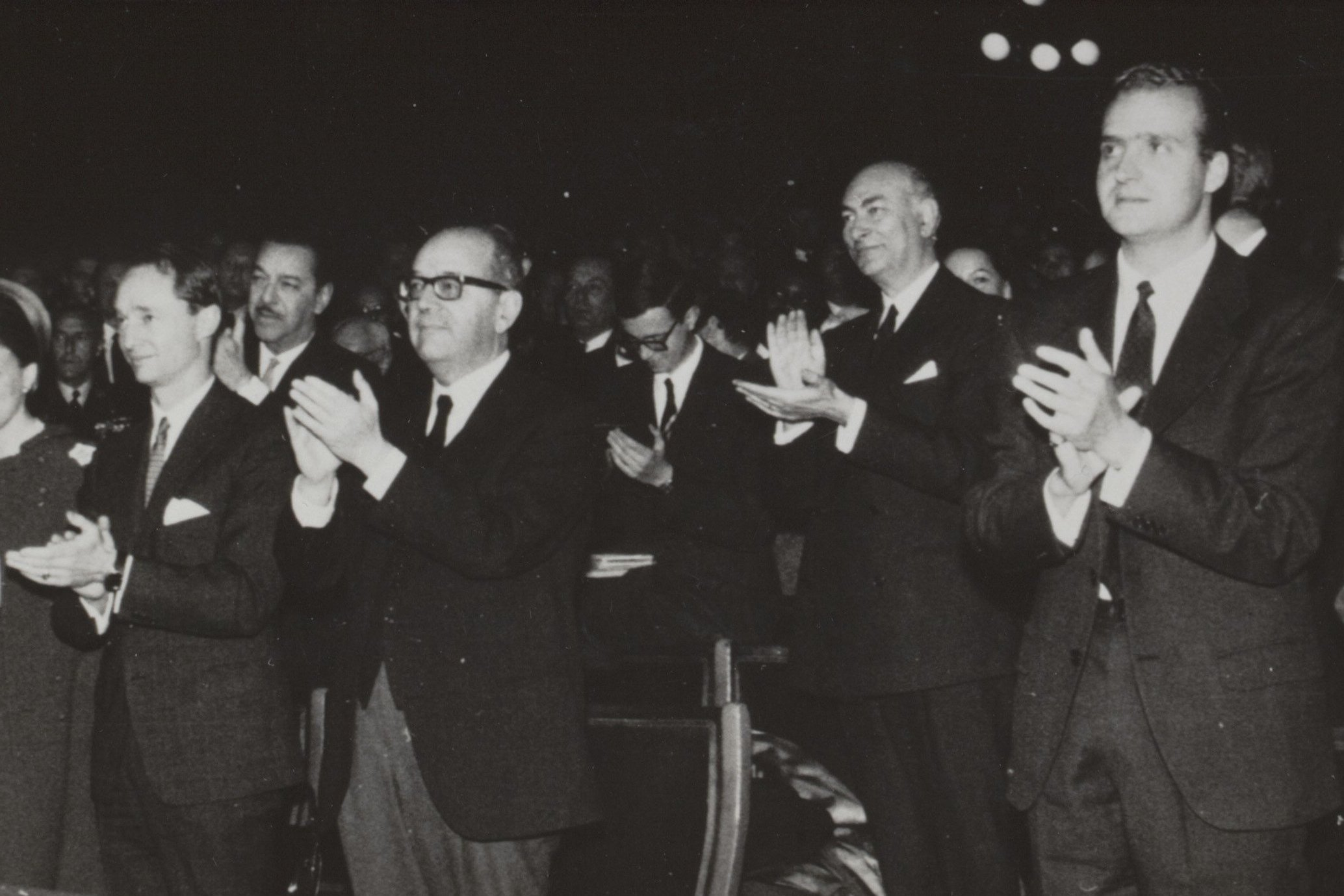
Carlist v. Alfonsist infantes, 1967

Since the early 1960s, Carlism was increasingly divided between an emergent progressist faction centred around Don Carlos Hugo and the Traditionalist core. In the mid-1960s, the progressists were already in control of key institutions of the movement. There is no information on d’Ors’ taking part in the internal power struggle. Though ideologically he was the key representative of Traditionalist orthodoxy and spoke out against subversive, revolutionary currents, marked by the deification of democracy and human rights, until 1968 he was among authors most frequently published in the carlo-huguista review, Montejurra. However, in the late 1960s, he was increasingly alienated by new ideas introduced by the prince and his entourage, especially that there were already few Traditionalists left in the command layer of the organization. He declared to Don Carlos Hugo “Vuestra Alteza es republicano”, and started to distance himself from the party structures. In the early 1970s, following grand carlo-huguista rallies in Arbonne, he withdrew from Consejo del Rey and terminated his links with the newly emergent Partido Carlista.

== Carlist: post-Franco years ==
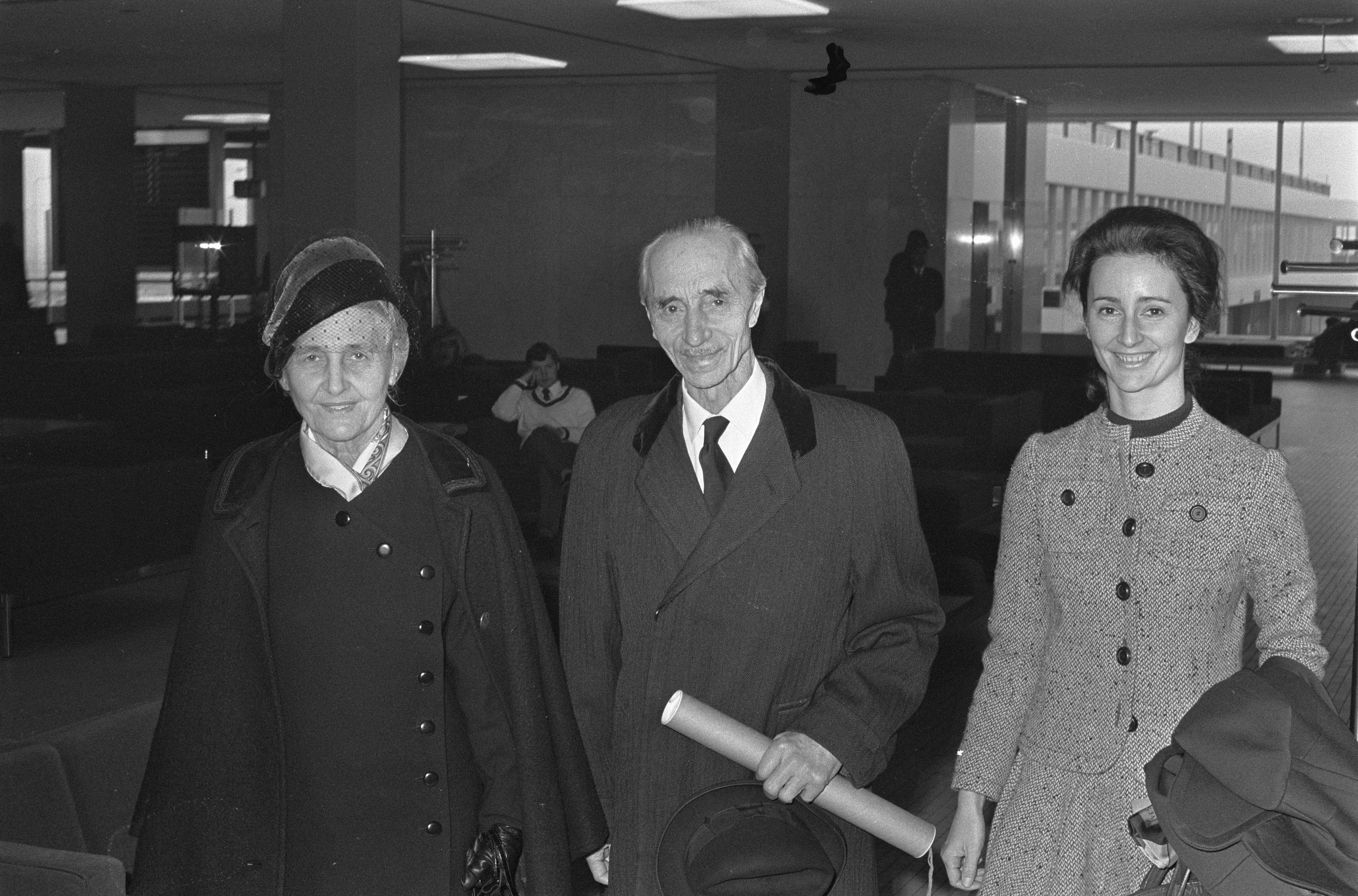
Don Javier, early 1970s

Since the early 1970s, d’Ors stayed clear of official Carlist structures, controlled by the carlo-huguistas; he was also greatly disappointed by the position taken by the claimant, Don Javier, who apparently condoned proto-socialist endeavors of his son, Don Carlos Hugo. However, he did not engage in open confrontation. In 1976 and encouraged by his daughter, he attended the annual Montejurra rally; according to his own account, he was unaware that the Traditionalists chose the event to confront Don Carlos Hugo and his followers. When the gathering turned into a melee he withdrew; however, some press titles claimed later that d’Ors instigated Traditionalist militants towards violence. Afterwards he visited some of them, like Arturo Márquez de Prado, during their brief incarceration period.

Close to nothing is known about d’Ors’ Carlist engagement at the turn of the decades. In the early 1980s, he maintained private relations with Traditionalist activists like Márquez de Prado, Javier Nagore Yárnoz or Miguel Garisoain and pundits like Antonio Segura, Rafael Gambra or Frederick Wilhelmsen; at times he took part in semi-scientific conferences or public rallies, e.g., the one commemorating the fallen requeté at Isusquiza. As numerous Carlist grouplets tried to overcome the period of fragmentation, d’Ors remained highly supportive; during a unification rally of 1986, which gave rise to Comunión Tradicionalista Carlista, he was present and got elected to its executive, Consejo Nacional. However, he was more of a patriarch than an active politician, and did not take part in day-to-day party activities. The exception were elections to the EU parliament, staged in 1994. He agreed to stand as the last candidate on the CTC list, his presence tailored to lend his personal prestige to other Carlist candidates running. The bid ended in total failure.

Carlist standard

As an octogenarian d’Ors considered Carlism a politically lost cause; according to his 2000 letter, the role of CTC was “to save principles of the Tradition against democratic correctness, which rules today”. It is not clear what was his opinion on another breakup, namely when followers of Don Sixto set up their own organization and left CTC. According to some sources, until death d’Ors remained in the CTC executive. In 2002 d’Ors became target of heavy criticism on part of the Sixtinos; it was following his article, which presented the Carlist theme "Dios Patria Rey" as somewhat obsolete. D’Ors suggested that religious question became largely a private issue, that patriotism was mostly down to defense of foral order, and that a king became a symbol of monarchy rather than a specific person or a dynasty. The Sixtino leader, Rafael Gambra, vehemently rejected the theory and charged d’Ors with the intention of reducing Carlism to “one more christian-democratic grouping”.

== Reception and legacy ==
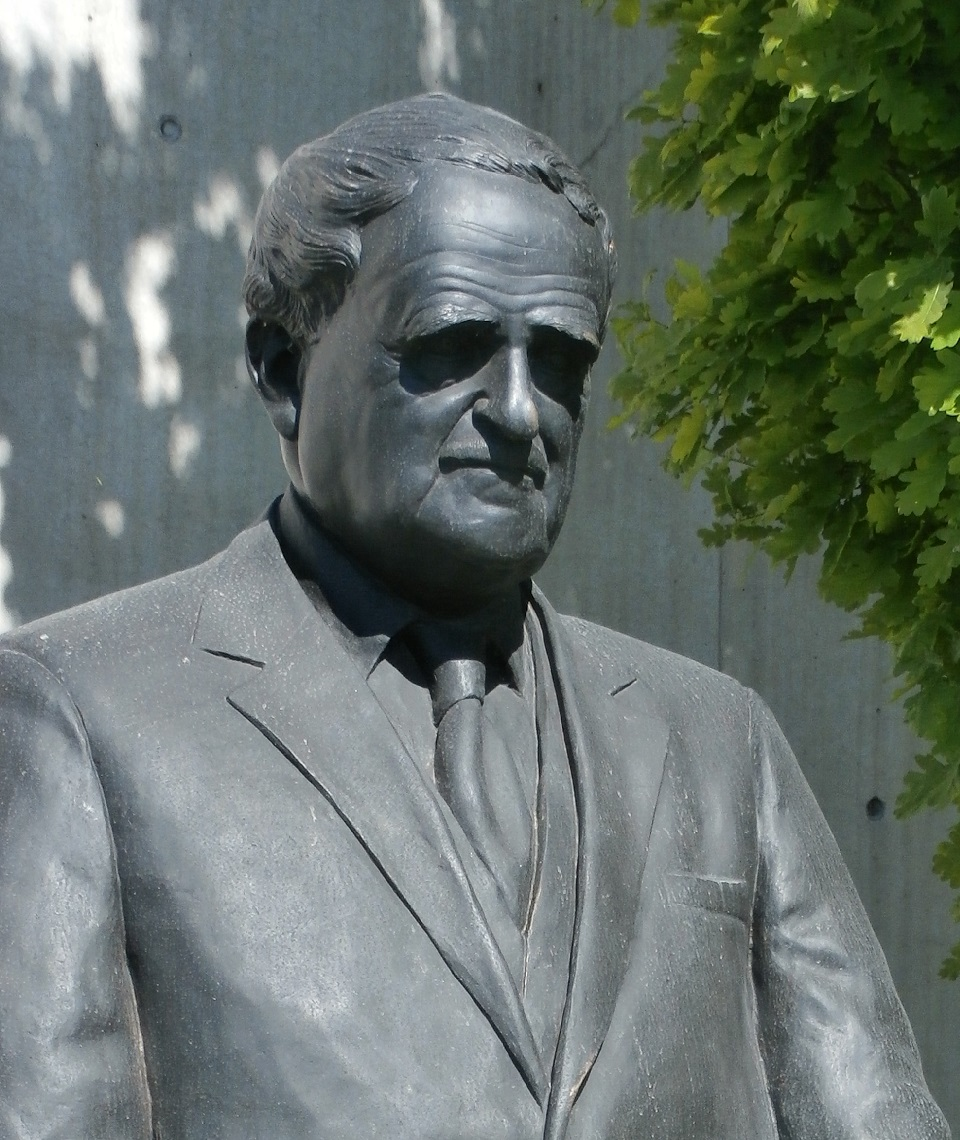
bust of d'Ors, Pamplona

D’Ors established his position among the best Spanish experts in Roman law following the 1953 publication of Epigrafía jurídica. However, he became known nationally upon receiving Premio Nacional de Literatura in 1954, the award which acknowledged his De la Guerra y de la Paz essays. In the 1960s, he was already the top national Roman law scholar. He was awarded Premio Nacional de Investigación (1973), Cruz de Alfonso X el Sabio (1974) and Gran Cruz de San Raimundo de Peñafort (1997), and honorary degrees by the universities of Toulouse (1972), Coimbra (1983) and La Sapienza (1996). D'Ors also was awarded honors by the University of Navarre, Eusko Ikaskuntza and Navarrese self-government. However, since the 1980s, he complained about having been increasingly isolated as a result of “revanchismo político.”

Currently d’Ors is counted among European scholars responsible for renaissance of studies in Roman law, most influential Roman law scholars of the 20th century, best Spanish jurists of the period, and best world romanistas of the last 150 years. In terms of theory of politics, he is counted among best European scholars of the 20th century and among greatest Traditionalist thinkers. However, it is noted that d’Ors was hardly known beyond Spain, the result of his decision to write in castellano only. His memory is cherished in the University of Navarra, which consider him a central figure in the development of the university. In 2013 a bust of d'Ors was placed at the entrance to the university library main building; in 2020 an interdisciplinary chair at the University of Navarra Institute of Culture and Society was named after d’Ors. Apart from Roman law, he is generally noted as expert in linguistics, philology, philosophy, papyrology, epigraphy, ancient history, civil law, canon law, foral law, legal theory, Catholic theology, social philosophy and theory of education. Numerous present-day academics are listed as his disciples.

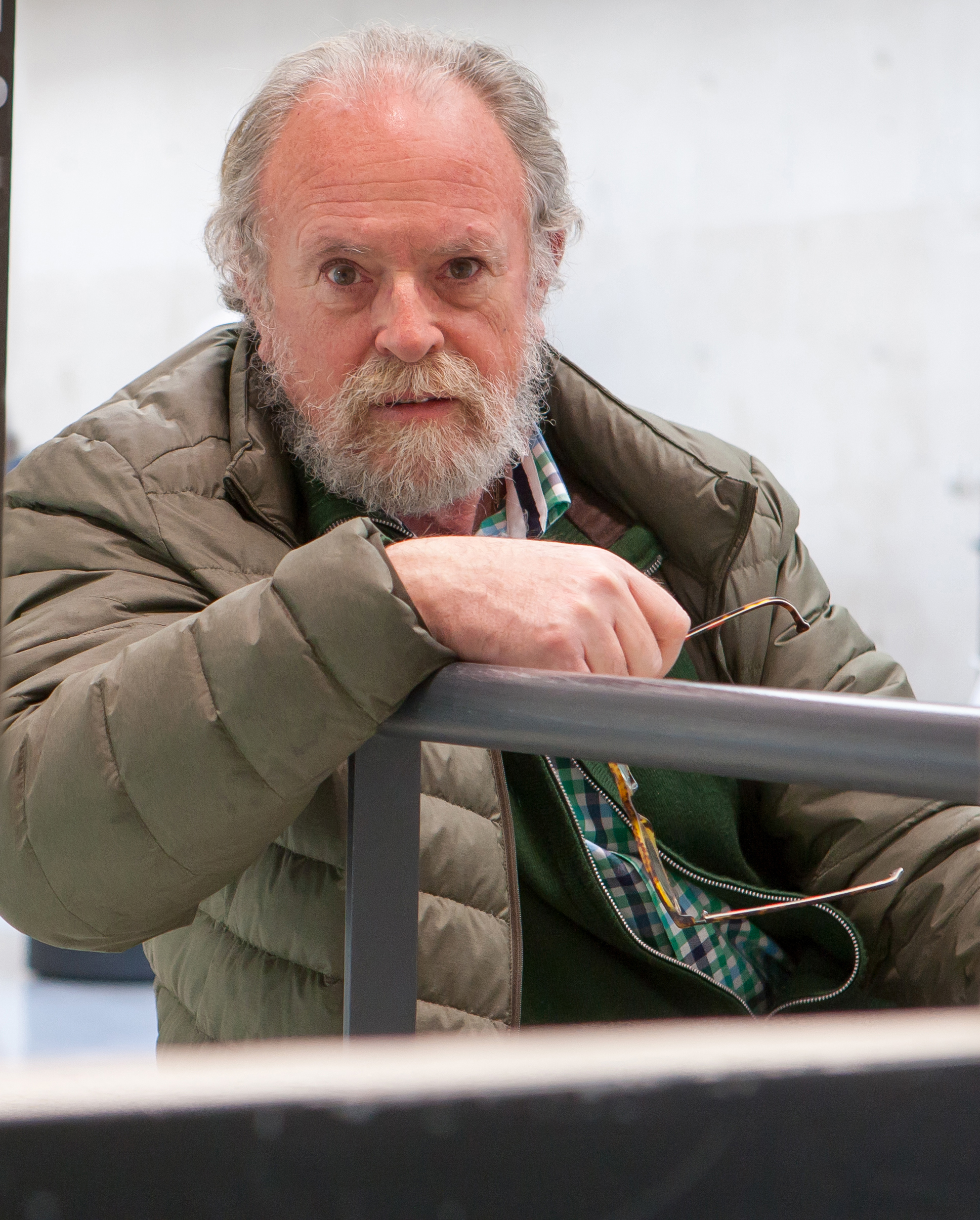
Gabriel Pérez Gómez, author of the 2020 biography on d'Ors

Attempts to classify d’Ors’ thought in terms of any specific school or current are fairly rare. Some consider him the member of an intellectual formation named “generation 48”; others ponder upon the labels of “escolástico” or “realista”; in the theory of law clearly supporter of natural law school, in the theory of politics he is also decisively categorized as a Traditionalist. All scholars underline his intellectual kinship to Carl Schmitt, but some underline differences, some relate him to the Schmittian decisionism, some categorize d’Ors concepts as “extreme” and discuss them against the background of pro-Nazi leaning of Schmitt. Some present d’Ors as a Traditionalist contributor to the Francoist ideology. In the Traditionalist ambience d’Ors is hailed as one of the all-time greats; the progressist ones offer challenge, criticism and highly ambiguous acknowledgement. Some note that in the theory of law many scholars follow him up to the point when their own clichés prevent further alignment. Among tens of scientific articles, some written as far away as in the United States, Chile, Mexico, Hungary or Poland, d’Ors earnt at least 3 doctoral dissertations, one written already during his lifetime. Among 3 books published one is an all-round biography, published by d’Ors’ son-in-law.

== See also ==
- Carlism
- Traditionalism (Spain)
- Roman law
- Eugenio d'Ors

== Footnotes ==
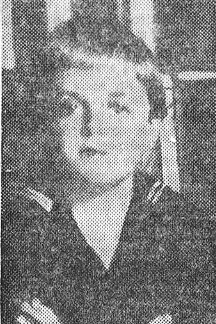
d'Ors, 1920s
