= Matiena gens =

Plebeian family of ancient Rome

The gens Matiena was a plebeian family at Rome. Members of this gens first appear in history in the time of the Second Punic War.

== Origin ==
Chase classifies the nomen Matienus as part of a group of Latin gentilicia that appear to be derived from other nomina, although the ultimate origin of the name is not apparent.

== Members ==
- Publius Matienus, a military tribune in the army of Scipio Africanus in 205 BC. After the capture of Locri, Matienus and another tribune, Marcus Sergius, were tortured and put to death by their commander, the proconsul Quintus Pleminius, after the tribunes' soldiers had quarreled and fought with those of Pleminius.
- Gaius Matienus, duumvir navalis in 181 BC, captured thirty-two ships from the Ligures.
- Marcus Matienus, (Note: Livy also refers to him as Gaius, suggesting the possibility that he was the same man as the duumvir navalis.) praetor in 173 BC, was assigned the province of Hispania Ulterior. After returning to Rome, he was accused of corruption and maladministration of his province, and went into exile at Tibur.

== See also ==
- List of Roman gentes

== Bibliography ==
- Titus Livius (Livy), Ab Urbe Condita (History of Rome).
- Dictionary of Greek and Roman Biography and Mythology, William Smith, ed., Little, Brown and Company, Boston (1849).
- George Davis Chase, "The Origin of Roman Praenomina", in Harvard Studies in Classical Philology, vol. VIII (1897).
- T. Robert S. Broughton, The Magistrates of the Roman Republic, American Philological Association (1952).
