= Duumviri =

Magistrates in ancient Rome

The duumviri (Latin for 'two men'), originally duoviri and also known in English as the duumvirs, were any of various joint magistrates of ancient Rome. Such pairs of Roman magistrates were appointed at various periods of Roman history both in Rome itself and in the colonies and municipia.

Duumviri iuri or iure dicundo were the highest judicial magistrates in the cities of Italy and its provinces. Their chief duties were concerned with the administration of justice. The activities of these individuals are described in the local statutes such as Lex Julia, Lex Irnitana, Lex Malacitana, Lex Rubria, Lex Coloniae, and Genetivae Iuliae. The office was determined by election and lasted one year. The duumviri were also expected to deal with public finance of a city and with proceedings in the Ordo decurionum (town council) and to run the elections in the comitium (assembly). Combined with the aediles, they formed the quattuorviri, a board of four officials. It was often the case that the emperor was elected as one duumvir and the other position was left up to the emperor for the appointment of a praefectus.

== Nature of the office ==
Duumviri quinquennales were also municipal officers, not to be confused with the above, who were elected every fifth year for one year to exercise the function of the censorship which was in abeyance for the intervening four years.

Duumviri sacrorum, which were created by Lucius Tarquinius Superbus, were officers for the performance of sacrifice, and keeping of the Sibylline Books. They were chosen out of the nobility, or patricii, and held their office for life. They were exempted from serving in war, and from the offices imposed on the other citizens. Without them, the oracles of the Sybils could not be consulted. The commission held until the year 388 BC, when, at the request of C. Licinius and L. Sexius, tribunes of the people, they were increased to ten (decemviri sacris faciundis). That is, in lieu of two persons, the trust was committed to ten—half patricians, half plebeians. Sulla added five to their number, for a total of fifteen (quindecimviri sacris faciundis). Afterwards, their body was greatly increased, and at length amounted to sixty; yet still retained the denomination of quindecimviri.

Duumviri aedi dedicandae were magistrates who, by way of a decree of the senate, performed the dedication of an area planned for the construction of a temple, or a temple already constructed, to a deity. Such an individual might be appointed to dedicate a temple that had been constructed at the expense of another magistrate who was no longer in office.

Duumviri aedi locandae were originally officers specially appointed to supervise the erection of a temple, if a higher magistrate such as a consul, praetor, or censor, was not managing it. These were sometimes the same as the duumviri aedi dedicandae.

Duumviri navales were extraordinary officers appointed ad hoc for the equipping of a fleet. Originally chosen by consuls or dictators, they were elected by the people after 311 BC (Livy, AUC ix. 30; xl. 18; xli. I).

The capital duumviri, duumviri perduellionis, were not ordinary magistrates, but created on certain occurrences. They were the earliest criminal court for trying cases of perduellio (high treason). They continued to be appointed under the Republic, with the last mention in 63 BC; however, since the mid-3rd century BC, plebeian tribunes are known to have taken up such cases. The first duumviri of this kind were those appointed to judge the surviving Horatii, for killing his sister after vanquishing the Curiatii.

Duumviri viis extra urbem purgandis were subordinate officers under the aediles, whose duty it was to look after those streets of Rome which were outside the city walls. They were members of the group of vigintisexviri. Apparently in 20 BC, certainly by 12 BC, their duties were transferred to the curatores viarum. From at least as early as 45 BC (cf. the Lex Julia), the streets of the city were superintended by quattuorviri viis in urbe purgandis, later called quattuorviri viarum purgandarum.
