= Lucius Hortensius =

2nd-century BCE Roman admiral

Lucius Hortensius was a statesman of the Hortensia gens of ancient Rome who lived in the 2nd century BCE.

Hortensius held several magistracies in the Cursus honorum, and was praetor in 171 BCE, succeeded Gaius Lucretius Gallus in the command of the fleet in the Third Macedonian War against Perseus of Macedon, and pursued a similar course of oppression as his predecessor.

After Perseus launched a successful raid on the town of Oreus, which destroyed a substantial amount of the fleet's grain stores, Hortensius anchored his fleet at the city of Abdera, Thrace, an ally of Rome, and demanded supplies: 100,000 denarii and 50,000 modii of wheat; and when the inhabitants sent to entreat the protection of the consul Aulus Hostilius Mancinus and of the Roman Senate, Hortensius was so enraged that he stormed and pillaged the city, beheaded its leading men, and sold the rest into slavery. This had a disastrous effect, as many neighboring towns such as Emathia, Amphipolis, Maronea, Aenus -- Rome's allies in theory -- promptly closed their harbors to Roman ships.

The senate contented themselves with voting Hortensius's actions to be unjust, and commanding that all who had been sold should be set free. Hortensius continued his outrages, and was again reprimanded by the senate for his treatment of the Chalcis, another ally, where he had looted the temples, and was egregiously billeting his troops in the homes of the populace. These acts were protested by the Chalcidean leader Mictio in the senate, who pointed out that as an ally whose city had opened its doors to Rome, Chalcis had been treated far worse than the other "allies" who barred Romans from entering. We do not know if Hortensius suffered any actual punishment or recall for this, or simply a further verbal reprimand.
