= Hortensia gens =

Plebeian family of ancient Rome

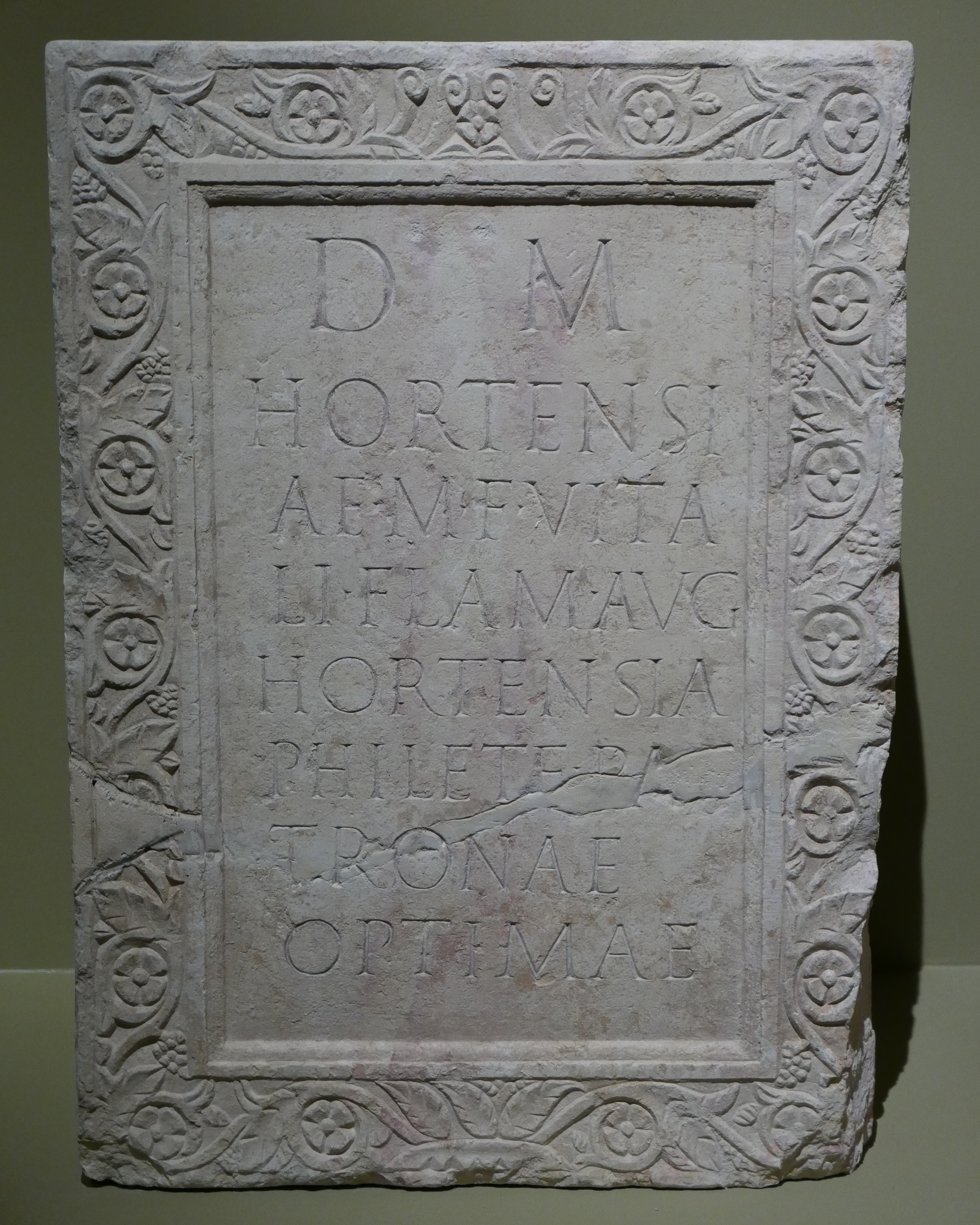
Funerary monument of Hortensia, daughter of Marcus Hortensius, Flaminica of the imperial cult. Dedicated by her client, Hortensia Philete.

The gens Hortensia was an ancient plebeian family in Rome. Members of this gens are first mentioned in the fifth century BC, but from that time somewhat infrequently until the final century of the Republic. The most illustrious of the gens was the orator Quintus Hortensius, a man of great learning, and a contemporary of Cicero. Under the Empire they seem to have sunk back into obscurity.

== Origin ==
The nomen Hortensius appears to be derived from horto, a garden, and probably signifies that the first to bear the name was a gardener. Chase believed the name was Latin, listing it among those nomina that either originated at Rome, or could not be shown to have come from anywhere else. However, Ogilvie points to the town of Urbinum Hortense in Umbria and the cult of Jupiter Hortensis in Campania as evidence that the name could have arisen elsewhere in Italy.

That the Hortensii were plebeian, despite Cicero's application of the word nobilis to the family, seems demonstrated by the fact that the first of the Hortensii to appear in history was tribune of the plebs, and the lack of any other evidence of a patrician family. From this it seems more likely that Cicero was referring to the distinguished record of the Hortensii in the service of the Roman state, rather than identifying the gens as patrician. Ogilvie doubts the existence of Quintus Hortensius, ostensibly tribune of the plebs in 422 BC, suggesting that this story was invented at the time of the marriage of Sempronia with Lucius Hortensius, the father of the famous orator, and concluding that the Hortensii probably arrived at Rome during the fourth century BC.

== Praenomina ==
All of the Hortensii at Rome mentioned in ancient sources bore the praenomina Quintus, Lucius, or Marcus, which were very common names at all periods of Roman history. They must occasionally have used other names, but these have not been recorded. An inscription from Ferentinum suggests Aulus and Sextus.

== Branches and cognomina ==
The only surnames found among the Hortensii are Hortalus, which seems to have originated as a nickname for the orator Hortensius, and Corbio, probably from corbis, a basket, both borne by descendants of the orator.

== Members ==
This list includes abbreviated praenomina. For an explanation of this practice, see filiation.

- Quintus Hortensius, tribune of the plebs in 422 BC, indicted Gaius Sempronius Atratinus, consul of the preceding year, for his negligence in preparation against the Volscians; but he was dissuaded from pursuing the charge by the loyalty shown to Sempronius, both by his former soldiers and by the other tribunes.
- Quintus Hortensius, appointed dictator in BC 287, in response to a secession of the plebs occasioned, once again, by debt. Hortensius passed a measure giving the force of law to plebiscita, effectively allowing the people to pursue debt relief without first having to obtain the approval of the Senate. Hortensius died before resigning his office, and was probably replaced by a dictator suffectus, the only instance of such an appointment in Roman history. (Note: The names of three dictators of this period have been preserved, whose years of office are unknown; one was probably dictator suffectus following Hortensius' death. They were Marcus Aemilius Barbula, Appius Claudius Caecus, and Publius Cornelius Rufinus. Mommsen thought Claudius the most likely to have succeeded Hortensius.)
- Lucius Hortensius, praetor in 170 BC, was given the command of the fleet in the war against Perseus. When the city of Abdera appealed from his demands for money and wheat, he stormed the city, had the leaders beheaded, and sold the rest into slavery. The Roman Senate repudiated these acts, and ordered that the people be set free. Hortensius continued to despoil Greece, and was upbraided for his harshness to the Chalcidians, but does not seem to have been recalled or punished.
- Quintus or Lucius Hortensius, elected consul in 108 BC, he was tried and condemned before taking office, and exiled.
- Lucius Hortensius, father of the orator, was praetor in Sicily in 97 BC, where his administration was remembered for its honesty and justice. He married Sempronia, daughter of Gaius Sempronius Tuditanus.
- Lucius Hortensius L. f., elder brother of the orator, was legate under Sulla during the First Mithridatic War. He acquitted himself admirably in the build-up to the Battle of Chaeronea, and again during the battle, despite the inferior size of his force.
- Quintus Hortensius L. f., the renowned orator and contemporary of Cicero. He served his country in the Social War, was quaestor in BC 81, praetor urbanus in 72, and consul in 69. He withdrew from public life as the first triumvirate began to dominate the affairs of the Roman state. His wife was Lutatia, daughter of Quintus Lutatius Catulus.
- Hortensia L. f., sister of the orator, married Marcus Valerius Messala. Her brother considered naming Hortensia's son as his heir, in preference to his own son, from whom he was estranged.
- Quintus Hortensius Q. f. L. n. Hortalus, son of the orator, from whom he was estranged. Just before the Civil War, he joined Caesar in Cisalpine Gaul, and it was Hortensius whom Caesar sent across the Rubicon. Proscribed after the death of Caesar, Hortensius had Gaius Antonius, brother of the triumvir, put to death in revenge. For this, he was executed upon Antonius' grave after the Battle of Philippi.
- Hortensia Q. f. L. n., daughter of the orator, intervened on behalf of the wealthy Roman matrons when the triumvirs proposed a special tax to pay for the war against Brutus and Cassius. She spoke with eloquence worthy of her father.
- Hortensius Q. f. L. n. Hortalus, second son of the orator from his marriage to Marcia.
- Quintus Hortensius Q. f. Q. n. Corbio, grandson of the orator, described by Valerius Maximus "as a person sunk in base and brutal profligacy."
- Marcius Hortalus, grandson of the orator and Marcia, was impoverished, but Augustus gave him sufficient income for his senatorial rank, and provided for his marriage. However, he made little of his fortune, and was once again impoverished by the reign of Tiberius. His name Marcius Hortalus indicates that he or his father was adopted by a male relative of Marcia.
- Aulus Hortensius, father of Sextus Hortensius Clarus.
- Sextus Hortensius A. f. Clarus, dedicated an Augusteum at Ferentinum during the reign of Caligula.

== See also ==
- List of Roman gentes

== Bibliography ==
- Marcus Tullius Cicero, Pro Quinctio, Epistulae ad Atticum, In Verrem, Philippicae.
- Titus Livius (Livy), Ab Urbe Condita (History of Rome).
- Valerius Maximus, Factorum ac Dictorum Memorabilium (Memorable Facts and Sayings).
- Gaius Plinius Secundus (Pliny the Elder), Naturalis Historia (Natural History).
- Appianus Alexandrinus (Appian), Bellum Civile (The Civil War).
- Marcus Fabius Quintilianus (Quintilian), Institutio Oratoria.
- Plutarchus, Lives of the Noble Greeks and Romans.
- Publius Cornelius Tacitus, Annales.
- Memnon of Heraclea, Historiarum.
- Gaius Suetonius Tranquillus, De Vita Caesarum (Lives of the Caesars, or The Twelve Caesars).
- Lucius Cassius Dio Cocceianus (Cassius Dio), Roman History.
- Wilhelm Drumann, Geschichte Roms in seinem Übergang von der republikanischen zur monarchischen Verfassung, oder: Pompeius, Caesar, Cicero und ihre Zeitgenossen, Königsberg (1834–1844).
- Dictionary of Greek and Roman Biography and Mythology, William Smith, ed., Little, Brown and Company, Boston (1849).
- Corpus Inscriptionum Latinarum
- George Davis Chase, "The Origin of Roman Praenomina", in Harvard Studies in Classical Philology, vol. VIII (1897).
- T. Robert S. Broughton, The Magistrates of the Roman Republic, American Philological Association (1952).
- Robert Maxwell Ogilvie, Commentary on Livy, books 1–5, Oxford, Clarendon Press, 1965.
