= Quintus Hortensius (consul designate 108 BC) =

Quintus Hortensius (or possibly Lucius Hortensius) (fl. 2nd century BC) was a Roman politician who was elected consul for 108 BC, but was prosecuted before he could take office.

== Biography ==
Hortensius was a member of the plebeian gens Hortensia, and possibly the uncle of the famous orator Quintus Hortensius. It has been speculated that he served as a legatus under Quintus Mucius Scaevola Augur in Asia in 121 BC, and was a witness at his trial in 120.

In 111 BC, it is believed that Hortensius served as praetor in Sicily. He was then elected consul in 109 BC for the following year (108 BC), but was put on trial and condemned prior to taking office, most likely for electoral bribery. He most likely then had his citizenship revoked before being exiled.

== Sources ==
- Broughton, T. Robert S., The Magistrates of the Roman Republic, Vol I (1951)
- Swan, Michael, The Consular Fasti of 23 BC and the Conspiracy of Varro Murena, Harvard Studies in Classical Phililogy, Volume 71, 1967, pgs. 235 - 247

== Notes ==
Political offices
Preceded by Quintus Caecilius Metellus and Marcus Iunius Silanus	Consul designate of the Roman Republic with Servius Sulpicius Galba; 108 BC	Succeeded by Marcus Aurelius Scaurus
