= Mictio =

2nd-century BCE Greek statesman

Mictio (Ancient Greek: Μίκτιον) was a leader at Chalcis, in Euboea, in the 2nd-century BCE.

He was attached to the Roman partisans in that city, and opposed to the Aetolian party in that island during the Roman–Seleucid war, fought between the Roman Republic and Antiochus III the Great. He defended Chalcis by establishing a league between the Chalcidians, Eretrians, and Carystians, and rejected the proposals of the Aetolians to remain neutral between Antiochus and the Romans.

In 170 BCE, Mictio appeared before the Roman Senate as the chief of a deputation sent from Chalcis to complain of the cruelty and extortions of two successive praetors in Greece, Gaius Lucretius Gallus and Lucius Hortensius. Mictio, who had a physical disability, was allowed to plead from a litter -- a privilege till then unheard of -- and, on his return, was conveyed to Brundisium in a carriage at public cost.
