= Marcus Lucretius (tribune of the plebs 172 BC) =

2nd-century BCE Roman general

Marcus Lucretius (possibly Marcus Lucretius Gallus) was tribune of the plebs in 172 BC. Like his brother, Gaius, presumably he was of local descent in Antium. In the same year, after Lucius Postumius Albinus had recovered for the Roman state a large amount of Campanian land that had been misappropriated by private citizens, Lucretius brought forward a bill (ut agrum Campanum censores fruendum locarent) in the Roman Senate proposing that the censors should rent out this land for farming.

In the following year, he served in the Third Macedonian War as legate to his brother, the general Gaius Lucretius Gallus, and was party to his war crimes in Haliartus. He commanded a fleet of eighty ships.
