= List of Roman consuls designate =

This is a list of Roman consuls designate, individuals who were either elected or nominated to the highest elected political office of the Roman Republic, or a high office of the Empire, but who for some reason did not enter office at the beginning of the year, either through death, disgrace, or due to changes in imperial administration.

== 6th–2nd centuries BC ==
Year BC	Year AUC	Nominated consul(s)	Replacement consul(s)	Reason for failure to take office
393	361	L. Valerius Potitus Poplicola, and Ser. Cornelius Maluginensis	L. Lucretius Tricipitinus Flavus, and Ser. Sulpicius Camerinus	Elected but abdicated before installation
220	534	M. Valerius Laevinus, and Q. Mucius Scaevola	Q. Lutatius Catulus, and L. Veturius Philo	Elected but gave up magistracies before being installed
215	539	L. Postumius Albinus	M. Claudius Marcellus	Elected but died in Cisalpine Gaul prior to taking office
108	646	Q. Hortensius	M. Aurelius Scaurus	Prosecuted and condemned before taking office

== 1st century BC ==
Year BC	Year AUC	Nominated consul(s)	Replacement consul(s)	Reason for failure to take office
99	655	Gaius Memmius	A. Postumius Albinus	Elected consul designate in 100 BC, but was murdered on the day he was elected in a riot sparked by Gaius Servilius Glaucia and Lucius Appuleius Saturninus
68	686	Servilius Vatia	None	Consul suffectus designate, elected after the death of Lucius Caecilius Metellus, but died before taking office
65	689	P. Cornelius Sulla, and P. Autronius Paetus	L. Aurelius Cotta, and L. Manlius Torquatus	Condemned for bribery before taking office
42	712	D. Junius Brutus Albinus	M. Aemilius Lepidus	Nominated in 45 BC by Julius Caesar, but his involvement in Caesar's assassination saw him killed in the civil war that followed (43 BC).
41	713	G. Cassius Longinus, and M. Junius Brutus	L. Antonius Pietas, and P. Servilius Isauricus II	Nominated by Julius Caesar, but their leading involvement in Caesar's assassination saw them killed at the Battle of Philippi in the civil war that followed (42 BC).
39	715	Q. Salvidienus Rufus	? L. Marcius Censorinus	Nominated by Octavianus, but his proposal to Marcus Antonius to betray Octavianus was uncovered, and he was either killed or committed suicide in 40 BC.
33	721	Sex. Pompeius Magnus	? L. Volcatius Tullus	As part of the treaty of Misenum, Sextus Pompeius was promised the consulate for this year. He died in 35 BC after falling out with Octavianus.
31	723	M. Antonius	M. Valerius Messalla Corvinus	Agreed that he would share the consulship in 31 BC with Octavianus, and although he claimed the office, it was not recognized in Rome.
29	725	Gaius Furnius	?	The younger Furnius, consul 17 BC, successfully reconciled his father and Octavian after the civil war and the elder Furnius became consul designatus in BC 29.
23	731	A. Varro Murena	Cn. Calpurnius Piso	Died before taking office

== 1st century AD ==
Year	Nominated consul(s)	Replacement consul(s)	Reason for failure to take office
4	L. Julius Caesar	Sextus Aelius Catus or Gaius Sentius Saturninus	Nominated consul designate in 2 BC for the year AD 4, but died 2 years before he was due to take office
40	M. Cocceius Nerva	None	Nominated consul designate for AD 40, but died before taking office
49	C. Silius	? C. Pompeius Longus Gallus	Nominated consul designate by the emperor Claudius, but was executed after marrying Claudius's wife, Valeria Messalina, in a probable plot against the emperor.
65	Plautius Lateranus		Nominated consul designate for AD 65, but was killed for his involvement against the emperor Nero in the Pisonian conspiracy.
68	Cingonius Varro		Nominated by Nero as consul designate for AD 68, but was killed by Galba in the aftermath of the failed usurpation of Nymphidius Sabinus.
69	P. Petronius Turpilianus II		Was consul designate in AD 68, but was executed by Galba on his way to Rome.
70	P. Valerius Marinus	D. Valerius Asiaticus	Nominated consul designate in AD 69 by the emperor Galba, but was deferred upon Galba's death.
70	Marcius Macer		Nominated consul designate by Otho in AD 69, but was passed over after the accession of Vitellius.
70	D. Valerius Asiaticus	T. Caesar Vespasianus	Nominated consul designate by Vitellius in AD 69, but was put aside with the accession of Vespasian.
83	M. Pompeius Silvanus Staberius Flavinus III		Nominated consul designate by Domitian, but died before taking office.

== 2nd and 3rd centuries AD ==
Year	Nominated consul(s)	Replacement consul(s)	Reason for failure to take office
128	P. Metilius Nepos II		Nominated consul designate for AD 128, but died prior to his taking office.
179	Cn. Julius Verus II		
between 177 and 180, or 198 and 209	L. Cestius Gallus		Unknown; based on reading of CIL X, 3722

== 4th and 5th centuries AD ==
Year	Nominated consul(s)	Replacement consul(s)	Reason for failure to take office
377	L. Aurelius Avianius Symmachus	Flavius Merobaudes	Nominated consul designate in AD 376, but died the same year.
385	Vettius Agorius Praetextatus	Flavius Bauto	Nominated consul designate in AD 384, but died the same year.
401	Gainas	Flavius Fravitta	Nominated consul designate in AD 400 by Arcadius, but killed during the political upheavals orchestrated by Aelia Eudoxia.

== See also ==
- List of Roman consuls
- List of undated Roman consuls

== Bibliography ==
- Dictionary of Greek and Roman Biography and Mythology, William Smith, ed., Little, Brown and Company, Boston (1849).
- Paul von Rohden, Elimar Klebs, & Hermann Dessau, Prosopographia Imperii Romani (The Prosopography of the Roman Empire, abbreviated PIR), Berlin (1898).
- Ronald Syme, The Roman Revolution, Oxford University Press (1939); "Governors Dying in Syria" in Zeitschrift für Papyrologie und Epigraphik, pp. 125–144 (1981).
- T. Robert S. Broughton, The Magistrates of the Roman Republic, vol. II (1952); vol. III (1986).
- Michael Swan, "The Consular Fasti of 23 BC and the Conspiracy of Varro Murena", Harvard Studies in Classical Philology, vol. 71, pp. 235 – 247 (1967).
- A. H. M. Jones & J. R. Martindale, The Prosopography of the Later Roman Empire, vol. I (1971).
- Alan Cameron, Barbarians and Politics at the Court of Arcadius, University of California Press (1993).
- Brian W. Jones, The Emperor Domitian, Taylor & Francis (1993).
- Vasily Rudich, Political Dissidence under Nero: the Price of Dissimulation, Routledge (1993).
- D. Wardle, "Suetonius' Life of Caligula: a Commentary", Revue d'Etudes Latines, vol. 225 (1994).
- Francis X. Ryan, Rank and Participation in the Republican Senate, Franz Steiner Verlag (1998).
- Miriam T. Griffin, Nero: The End of a Dynasty, Psychology Press (2000).
- Linda Jones Hall, Roman Berytus: Beirut in late antiquity, Routledge (2004).
- Barbara Levick, 66 Claudius, Yale University Press (1993); Vespasian, Routledge (1999).
