= Gaius Matienus =

2nd-century BCE Roman naval commander

Gaius Matienus was a plebeian general of ancient Rome, of the Matiena gens, who lived in the 2nd century BCE.

Together with Gaius Lucretius Gallus he was appointed duumvir navalis by the Roman Senate in 181 BCE, during the Third Macedonian War. His mandate seems separate from the war effort, and was to police the coast of the Ligurian Sea, from the Gulf of Naples as far as Massalia, largely in a historical effort to deter Ligurian pirates and counter any incursions of Ligurian ships launched from the shore, but also in response to direct complaints from Massalia, Tarentum, and Brundisium about the insecurity of their trade routes.

In this same year he took thirty-two of the Ligurian ships, and threw scores of sailors into prison. This quashed the Ligurian pirates -- and contemporary writers characterize the offensive as such -- but also effectively eliminated Liguria as a maritime power forever.
