= Gaius Lucretius Gallus =

2nd-century BCE Roman general

Gaius Lucretius Gallus was general of ancient Rome who served in the Third Macedonian War during the 2nd century BCE. According to an orientation, he was of local descent in Antium.

== Military career ==
He was appointed duumvir navalis, with Gaius Matienus, by the Roman Senate in 181 BCE, in order to equip a fleet against the Ligurians. The historian Livy calls him simply Gaius Lucretius, but most scholars assume this is the same as Gaius Lucretius Gallus.

He was praetor in 171 BCE, and received the command of a Roman fleet consisting of 40 quinqueremes in the Third Macedonian War against Perseus of Macedon. He made his base at Cephalonia. Even in the eyes of ancient writers, he, along with the consul Publius Licinius Crassus, behaved appallingly during the campaign, and was noted for his cruelty, allowing his troops to commit atrocities in Greek cities, even friendly ones. With his brother, Marcus Lucretius, he laid siege to the Boeotian city of Haliartus (which had sided with Perseus). After his force was victorious, they razed the city to the ground, plundered everything valuable in it, sold its citizens into slavery, and, even after its citizens had surrendered, conducted mass executions. Shortly afterward he took Thisbe without a fight, and later, Coroneia by force.

His cruelties extended even beyond the war. After the campaign had completed, the fleet stayed idle at the Euboean city of Chalcis, where, according to later accusations by the Chalcidians, he looted the city's temples and sold free citizens into slavery.

== Public works ==
With the money he amassed from these activities, he continued a tradition of using plundered wealth to build public works (ex manubiis), and constructed an aqueduct at Antium, in the territory of which Gallus had a private estate, and also adorned the shrine of Aesculapius with votive pictures.

== Accusation ==
On Gallus's return to Rome in 170 BCE, Mictio, the leader of the Chalcidians, as well as a separate representative of the Athenians, appeared before the Roman Senate and brought bitter complaints against him, in consequence of which he was accused by Gnaeus Aufidius and Manius Juventius Thalna before the people, and condemned to pay a heavy fine of one million asses.
