= National Prize for Literature =

A National Prize for Literature (Spanish: Premio Nacional de Literatura) is a kind of award offered by various countries.

Examples include:

- National Prize for Literature (Argentina)
- National Literary Awards, Burma
- National Prize for Literature (Chile)
- Premio Nacional de Literatura (Costa Rica)
- National Prize for Literature (Cuba)
- National Prize for Literature (Dominica)
- Guatemala National Prize in Literature
- National Prize for Literature (Paraguay)
- National Prize for Literature (Spain)
- National Prize for Literature (Mexico) (Premio Nacional de Lingüística y Literatura) - see National Prize of Arts and Sciences (Mexico)
- National Prize for Literature (Venezuela)
- National Prize for Literature (Galicia)
