= Lex Irnitana =

Collection of six bronze tablets containing Flavian municipal law

- Type: Bronze legal tablets (municipal charter)
- Material: Bronze
- Size: 57.5 cm × 91.5 cm (22.6 in × 36.0 in) (per tablet)
- Writing: Latin
- Created: 91 CE (Flavian era)
- Period/culture: Roman Empire
- Discovered: 1981
- Place: Circei, Italy (signed by Emperor Domitian)
- Present location: Archaeological Museum of Seville, Seville, Spain
- Culture: Hispano-Roman

The lex Irnitana consists of fragments of Roman municipal laws dated to AD 91 which had been inscribed on a collection of six bronze tablets found in 1981 near El Saucejo, Spain. Together with the Lex Salpensana and the Lex Malacitana it provides the most complete version of the lex Flavia municipalis, or the Flavian municipal law. and has allowed new insights into the workings of Roman law. The tablets are exhibited in the Archeological Museum of Seville. Since the tablets provide the only surviving copy of large parts of the Flavian municipal law, they have provided new insights into the procedural side of municipal courts.

== Description ==
The tablets measure 57.5 by 91.5 cm (22.6 by 36.0 in) and each has three holes at the top and bottom to fix them to the facade of an official building at a height where it could easily be read, as expressly required by article 95. In total they must have stretched some 9 m (30 ft) like an unrolled volumen. The letters measure 4–6 mm (0.16–0.24 in) in height and the text is framed by a simple molding.

The six surviving tablets are engraved III, V, VII, VIII, IX and X. Fragments of tablet II have later been discovered. A sanctio, a legal endorsement, on tablet X shows that it is the last tablet. The plates each consist of three columns of text which survives largely intact. It contains 96 articles (rubricae), an addendum and a letter from Domitian. The articles are not numbered but marked by Rubrica followed by a short description. Correlating the Lex Irnitana with other finds, it is possible to reconstruct most of the original numbering except for twelve sections at the end of tablet V.

== Dating ==
The letter which is included at the end provides two dates for the text: Litterae datae IIII idus Apriles Circeis recitatae V idus Domitianas, which dates the letter to the 10th of April and its (public) reading to the 11th of the month Domitian (October) both in the year that Manius Acilius Glabrio and Marcus Ulpius Traianus were consuls (AD 91) and is consistent with the granting of Latin Rights to Baetica in 73/74 and the original text of the document must have been composed somewhere in between using fragments of existing provisions in older laws from Augustean and even Republican times. The addendum is written in a smaller script than the rest of the text and is thought to have been added in the second or third century.

== Content ==
The document contains the municipal regulations of the Hispano-Roman city of Irni and is signed by Emperor Domitian in Circei (Italy) in the year 91. The text deals with the competencies of duumviri, aediles and quaestores, regulates the decurional order, manumission and the appointment of guardians, the relations between patronus and cliens, the acquisition of Roman civil rights by magistrates and public affairs, including the funding of cults, priesthoods, rituals, calendar and games, which were considered a religious matter.

The text of the law was standard for all cities that held the rank of a municipality; only the name was changed when it was inscribed on bronze tablets for public display. It lays out the rules by which municipal life was to be governed. Among them are those that refer to the responsibilities of authorities, the order of intervention in assemblies, the holding of elections, the appointment of judges, the remuneration of municipal workers, the expenses that could be incurred from the public treasury, Roman citizenship, the appointment of guardians, and the continued prohibition of mixed marriages between Romans and indigenous people. However, it provides a dispensation for those marriages celebrated before the promulgation of the law.

Chapters 52 to 55 of the law contain parts of the regulations governing the annual local elections that allowed for the appointment of the city's magistrates. Their strong similarities to modern elections make these passages particularly intriguing, where instructions are also provided regarding candidate requirements and the mechanics to follow on election day.

The Law of Irni practically reproduces the entire text of the laws of Salpensa and Malaca, also fitting within it the known fragments from Basilipo and Italica. Due to its greater length, the Law of Irni appears as the main known text of Roman law in the provinces.

The Irnitano municipality was unknown prior to the discovery of these tablets, with no reference in epigraphy or literary sources. Excavations carried out in the area of their finding revealed a Romanized Iberian settlement, although it cannot be confirmed that this is Irni. The house where the tablets were located appears to have been a bronzesmith workshop, to which they might have been moved for melting, probably around the 3rd to 4th century.

The discovery of the tablets altered the landscape of Hispanic municipal laws, confirming the existence of a model law, the "Flavia", from which different municipalities would have drawn their respective copies. Due to its greater length, the Law of Irni stands out as the primary text, relegating the laws of Salpensa and Málaga to a secondary position.

== Bibliography ==
- D'Ors, A (1983). La nueva copia Irnitana de la lex Flavia Municipalis. AHDE. p. 5-15.
- González, Julián (2012). "The Lex Irnitana: a New Copy of the Flavian Municipal Law". The Journal of Roman Studies. 76. JRS: 147–243. doi:10.2307/300371. JSTOR 300371.
- Lamberti, Francesca (1993). Tabulae Irnitanae. Municipalità e „ius Romanorum“ [Tabulae Irnitanae. Municipality and „ius Romanorum“]. Pubblicazioni del Dipartimento di Diritto Romano e Storia della Scienza Romanistica dell’Università degli Studi di Napoli „Federico II“, vol. 6. Naples: Jovene, ISBN 88-243-1023-0.
- Wolf, Joseph Georg (2012). Lex Irnitana. Gesammelte Aufsätze [Lex Irnitana. Collected essays]. Freiburger rechtsgeschichtliche Abhandlungen, vol. N. F. 66. Berlin: Duncker & Humblot, ISBN 978-3-428-13930-9.
