= Duumviri navales =

Roman naval officers responsible for fleet

The Duumviri navales, lit. 'two men dealing with naval matters', were two naval officers elected by the people of Rome to repair and equip the Roman fleet. Both Duumviri navales were assigned to one Roman consul, and each controlled 20 ships. It has been suggested that they may have been in charge of the ships of the Socii navales rather than those of the Roman fleet. The position was established in 311 BC by the Lex Decia.

== History ==
Only two operations of the fleet of the Duumviri navales are known, that they set up a colony on Corsica in 311 BC, and that they were destroyed in battle against the Tarentines in 282 BC. Some historians believe that they ceased to exist in 267 BC, and were replaced by four Quaestores classici, However, other historians believe that the Quastores classici acted as auxiliaries to the Duumviri navales, rather than replacing them.

== Known Duumviri Navales ==
- Publius Cornelius
- Gaius Matienus.
- Gaius Lucretius Gallus

== See also ==
- Duumviri
