= Lex Malacitana =

Latin local statutes

- Category:Lex Malacitana
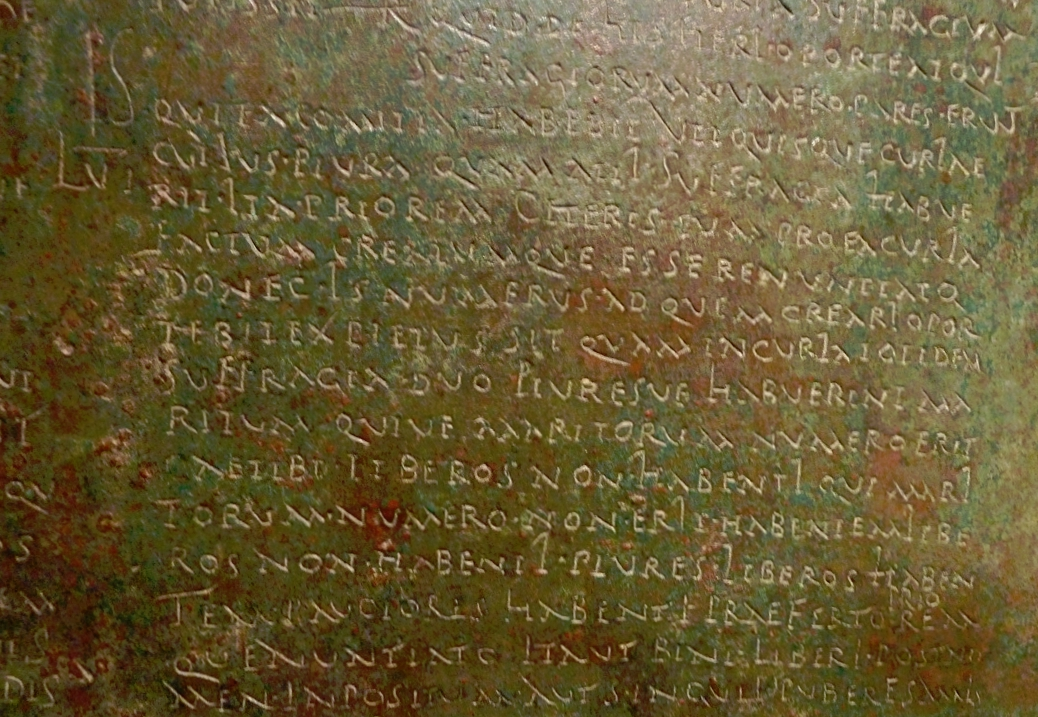
- Location: Spain

Lex Malacitana or Lex Flavia Malacitana ("Flavian law of Malaca") is a bronze tablet bearing Latin local statutes which deal with the official activities of the duoviri iuri dicundo. The tablet was found in the 20th century near Malaca (modern Málaga) with the lex Salpensana, and it was dated from AD 81–84, i.e. the early reign of Domitian. Malaca was governed under this law, which granted free-born persons the privileges of Roman citizenship.

Together with the lex Salpensana and the lex Irnitana it provides the most complete version of the lex Flavia municipalis, or the Flavian municipal law. and has allowed new insights into the workings of Roman law. The tablets are exhibited in the National Archaeological Museum, Madrid. Since the tablets provide the only surviving copy of large parts of the Flavian municipal law, they have provided new insights into the procedural side of municipal courts.

In December 2016 a petition to Congreso de los Diputados was offered to give it back to the Museo de Málaga. The Ministerio de Cultura studied the case, and on 12 March 2018 Spanish Government denied it.

== History ==
The Romanization of Málaga, as in most of the southern Hispania Ulterior, was peaceful and conducted through agreements, foedus aequum, of mutual friendship and equality. During this era, the Municipium Malacitanum was a transit and exchange hub within the Via Herculea, invigorating the city both economically and culturally. It connected the city with other settlements in the interior of Hispania and with other ports in the Mediterranean.

Following the civil wars that occurred in the Empire in 68-69 (known as the "Year of the Four Emperors"), Vespasian emerged as the victor. He founded the Flavian dynasty and had strong allies in Hispania. In the year 74, the city of Malaca might have requested the emperor to grant them the Lex Flavia, under the provision of granting Latin rights to all of Hispania. However, this grant of citizenship did not materialize until sometime between the years 81 and 96, during the reign of Domitian, who is mentioned in the oaths of the text.

== Discovery ==
The tablets were discovered in 1851 in the area of Monte de El Ejido, in the city of Málaga by local workers. Their initial intention was to sell these pieces as scrap metal to the Luque family, who were bronze craftsmen. Before they could be melted down, news of the tablets' existence reached the Malaga-based couple Amalia Heredia Livermore and Jorge Loring Oyarzábal. They acquired the tablets with the intention of starting an archaeological collection. Subsequently, Manuel Rodríguez de Berlanga y Rosado, Jorge Loring's brother-in-law, studied, translated, and disseminated the Lex Flavia Malacitana among specialists. For his efforts, he was knighted with the Order of Isabella the Catholic.

For years, these tablets were displayed in the Loringiano Museum on the La Concepción estate. However, the Loring family decided to sell their collection of legal bronzes to the state to ensure that this valuable find would not be dispersed after their death. As a result, they became part of the collection of the National Archaeological Museum. Currently, the city council owns a copy of these tablets, which is displayed in its Plenary Hall. A replica can also be seen in the Customs House of Málaga.

== Description of the Lex Flavia Malacitana ==
The Lex Flavia Malacitana consists of municipal tablets typically placed in a prominent location within the forum, which was the political and religious center of cities. Their purpose was to ensure that all citizens were familiar with the municipality's regulations.

Originally composed of five bronze tablets, only one remains. This preserved tablet measures approximately 89 cm in height and 122 cm in width, with a thickness varying from 0.9 cm on the left to 0.5 cm on the right. Its top and bottom edges are irregular, while the sides are smooth. Including its frame, the total dimensions extend to 94 cm by 130 cm, and the tablet weighs 90 kg. The inscription appears to have been engraved prior to the frame's assembly, as the frame would have hindered the burin's movement during the engraving process.

The tablet contains a portion of the version of the Lex Latii given by Domician to the new Flavian Municipality of Malaca. It retains chapters 51 through 66.

Each chapter is preceded by its title, indented, and introduced by a heading. The first line of each chapter protrudes to the left and begins with one or two larger or interwoven letters; beneath them is the chapter number. The inscription is abundant with large-sized letters, among which some, such as I, T, and L, can be challenging to distinguish. Forgotten words were added in smaller letters. Punctuation marks appear as small triangles placed somewhat haphazardly. Traces of white paint remain, which was commonly used to highlight letters on bronze inscriptions. Domiciano's name was erased after his death due to the damnatio memoriae ordered by the Senate upon the rise of Nerva.

== Content ==
The Lex Flavia Malacitana, in its current state, preserves only nineteen chapters related to the system and processes of accessing magistracies. Contained within it are the procedures for the election and voting of magistrates by popular assemblies; the appointment of municipal patrons; and regulations for the management of public funds. It demonstrates a census-based organization, which distributes obligations and rights based on the economic capacity of the citizens.

A portion of the law aligns almost verbatim with the two Hispalense fragments from the Lex Salpensana (related to Utrera) and Lex Irnitana, which address the obligation to reimburse municipal treasury funds as well as the obligation to report to the decurions for transactions made with public funds. Similarly to the Salpensa law, interpolations of the original text, the Lex Flavia Municipal, are common.

The urban character of the Roman Empire is evident in its provisions. For instance, the stipulation that owners of buildings destroyed, whether with sufficient reason or not, should rebuild them within a year or face a fine. Additionally, works that were initiated would be subject to public disclosure through tablets or posters on the streets. The character of federated cities, which could use their own legal system, is evident in the fact that citizens of Malaca could present their candidates for local aediles without taking into account imperial designations. The tablets also mention aspects related to the imperial cult.

== Bibliography ==
- Berger, Adolf (1953). Encyclopedic Dictionary of Roman Law. Vol. 43. American Philosophical Society. p. 476. ISBN 9780871694324.
- Canto, Alicia M (1996). Oppida stipendiaria: los municipios flavios en la descripción de Hispania de Plinio. Madrid: Universidad Autónoma de Madrid. p. 212-243.
- Chueca Goitia, Fernando (1998). Madrid, pieza clave de España. Real Academia de la Historia. p. 117. ISBN 84-89512-20-5.
- Lecuona, Emilio (2001). "JORNADAS DE ESTUDIO POR EL 150 ANIVERSARIO DEL HALLAZGO DE LA LEX FLAVIA MALACITANA". Revista de Estudios Histórico-Jurídicos (23). Valparaíso. doi:10.4067/S0716-54552001002300041.
- Stylow, Armin. U (2001). Mainake. Las Leyes Municipales en Hispania. 150 Aniversario del descubrimiento de la Lex Flavia Malacitana (PDF). p. 39-50. Archived from the original (PDF) on 2010-03-31.
