= Lucius Aurelius Cotta =

Lucius Aurelius Cotta was a name used by men of the gens Aurelia in Ancient Rome. They belonged to the Aurelii Cottae, a family who were the relatives of Gaius Julius Caesar through his mother Aurelia Cotta.

- Lucius Aurelius Cotta (tribune 181 BC), military tribune in 181 BC with Sextus Julius Caesar;
- Lucius Aurelius Cotta (consul 144 BC), father of the consul in 119 BC;
- Lucius Aurelius Cotta (consul 119 BC), father or paternal uncle of Aurelia Cotta, the mother of the Roman dictator Julius Caesar;
- Lucius Aurelius Cotta (tribune 95 BC), plebeian tribune in 95 BC and later praetor;
- Lucius Aurelius Cotta (consul 65 BC), son of the consul in 119 BC or his brother Marcus Aurelius Cotta.
