= Cotta =

Cotta may refer to:

== People ==
- Cotta (cognomen)
- Cotta (surname)

== Other uses ==
- Ancient Roman town in Morocco
- A surplice, an ecclesiastical garment (in Medieval Latin and Italian)
- A lightweight underdress in Italian 15th-century fashion (cf. cotte)
- Cotta (moth), a moth of the family Geometridae
- Cotta Sandstone, a type of stone found in the Elbe Valley

== See also ==
- Dresden-Cotta railway station, Germany
- Kata (disambiguation)
- Terra Cotta (disambiguation)
