= Avrelya =

Avrelya may refer to:

- Avrelya, a diminutive of the Russian male first name Avrelian
- Avrelya, a diminutive of the Russian male first name Avrely
- Avrelya, a diminutive of the Russian female first name Avreliya
