= Cotta (cognomen) =

Cotta was a Roman cognomen. People bearing this cognomen include:

- Gaius Aurelius Cotta (124–73 BCE), Roman statesman and orator
- Gaius Aurelius Cotta (consul 252 BC), Roman general and statesman, consul in 252 and 248 BCE, censor in 241 BCE
- Gaius Aurelius Cotta (consul 200 BC), Roman consul 200 BCE
- Lucius Aurelius Cotta (consul 65 BC), Ancient Roman politician, consul 65 BCE
- Lucius Aurelius Cotta (consul 119 BC), Roman Senator and military commander, Senator, consul 119 BCE
- Lucius Aurelius Cotta (consul 144 BC), Roman senator, consul 144 BCE
- Lucius Aurunculeius Cotta, 1st century BC Roman legate
- Marcus Aurelius Cotta (consul 74 BC), Roman general, politician and consul in 74 BCE
- Marcus Aurelius Cotta Maximus Messalinus, Roman Senator and consul who was a friend of the Roman emperors Augustus and Tiberius

== See also ==
- Aurelia (mother of Caesar), known as Aurelia Cotta (120–54 BC), mother of Julius Caesar
