= Relya =

Relya may refer to:

- Relya, a diminutive of the Russian male first name Avrelian
- Relya, a diminutive of the Russian male first name Avrely
- Relya, a diminutive of the Russian female first name Avreliya
