= Aurelia gens =

Ancient Roman family

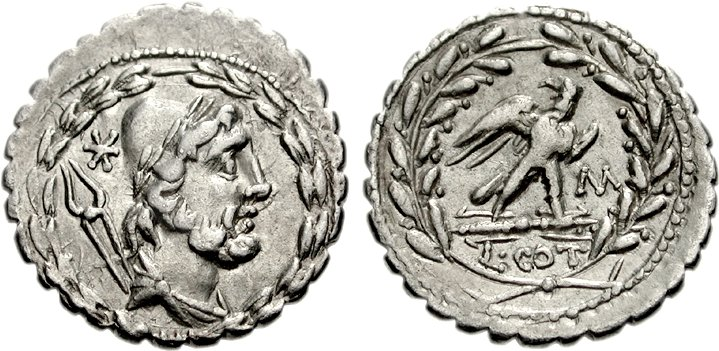
Denarius of Lucius Aurelius Cotta, 105 BC. The obverse is identical to the coins of Lipara, captured by Gaius Aurelius Cotta in 252 BC. The reverse depicts the triumph awarded for this victory.

The gens Aurelia was a plebeian family at ancient Rome, which flourished from the third century BC to the latest period of the Empire. The first of the Aurelian gens to obtain the consulship was Gaius Aurelius Cotta in 252 BC. From then to the end of the Republic, the Aurelii supplied many distinguished statesmen, before entering a period of relative obscurity under the early emperors. In the latter part of the first century, a family of the Aurelii rose to prominence, obtaining patrician status, and eventually the throne itself. A series of emperors belonged to this family, through birth or adoption, including Marcus Aurelius and the members of the Severan dynasty.

In 212, the Constitutio Antoniniana of Caracalla (whose full name was Marcus Aurelius Antoninus) granted Roman citizenship to all free residents of the Empire, resulting in vast numbers of new citizens who assumed the nomen Aurelius, in honour of their patron, including several emperors: seven of the eleven emperors between Gallienus and Diocletian (Claudius Gothicus, Quintillus, Probus, Carus, Carinus, Numerian and Maximian) bore the name "Marcus Aurelius". So ubiquitous was the name in the latter centuries of the Empire that it suffered abbreviation, as Aur., and it becomes difficult to distinguish members of the Aurelian gens from other persons bearing the name.

== Origin ==
The nomen Aurelius is usually connected with the Latin adjective aureus, meaning "golden", in which case it was probably derived from the color of a person's hair. However, Festus reports that the original form of the nomen was Auselius, and that the medial 's' was replaced by 'r' at a relatively early period; the same process occurred with the archaic nomina Fusia, Numisia, Papisia, Valesia, and Vetusia, which became Furia, Numeria, Papiria, Valeria, and Veturia in classical Latin. According to Festus, Auselius was derived from a Sabine word for the sun.

== Praenomina ==
All of the praenomina used by the chief families of the Aurelii were common throughout Roman history. The Aurelii of the Republic primarily used Gaius, Lucius, Marcus, and Publius, to which the Aurelii Orestides added Gnaeus. The Aurelii Fulvi of imperial times used Titus, Marcus, and Lucius, while the Aurelii Symmachi used Quintus and Lucius.

== Branches and cognomina ==
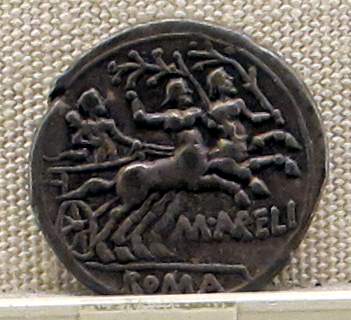
Denarius of Marcus Aurelius Cotta, 139 BC.

There were three main stirpes of the Aurelii in republican times, distinguished by the cognomina Cotta (also spelled Cota), Orestes, and Scaurus. Cotta and Scaurus appear on coins, together with a fourth surname, Rufus, which does not occur among the ancient writers. A few personal cognomina are also found, including Pecuniola, apparently referring to the poverty of one of the Aurelii during the First Punic War.

Cotta, the surname of the oldest and most illustrious branch of the Aurelii under the Republic, probably refers to a cowlick, or unruly shock of hair; but its derivation is uncertain, and an alternative explanation might be that it derives from a dialectical form of cocta, literally "cooked", or in this case "sunburnt". Marcus Aurelius Cotta, moneyer in 139 BC, minted an unusual denarius, featuring Hercules in a biga driven by centaurs, presumably alluding to some mythological event connected with the gens, but the exact symbolism is unknown. The Aurelii Cottae were prominent from the First Punic War down to the time of Tiberius, after which they faded into obscurity. The last of this family appearing in history include Marcus Aurelius Cotta Maximus Messalinus, a friend of Tiberius, who squandered his family fortune through reckless prodigality, and his son, who received a stipend from Nero in order to maintain his household in a manner befitting his illustrious forebears. The Cottae were related to Julius Caesar and Augustus through Aurelia Cotta, who was Caesar's mother.

The Aurelii Scauri were a relatively small family, which flourished during the last two centuries of the Republic. Their surname, Scaurus, belongs to a common class of cognomina derived from an individual's physical features, and referred to someone with swollen ankles.

Orestes, the surname of a family that flourished for about a century toward the end of the Republic, was a Greek name, and belonged to a class of surnames of foreign origin, which appear during the middle and late Republic. In Greek mythology, Orestes was the son of Agamemnon and Clytemnestra, and avenged his father's murder by slaying his own mother, and after escaping the judgment of the Erinyes, became king of Mycenae. The circumstances by which the name became attached to a branch of the Aurelii are unclear, but perhaps allude to some heroic deed, or military service in Greece.

The Aurelii Fulvi, who rose to prominence in imperial times, originally came from Nemausus in Gallia Narbonensis. Titus Aurelius Fulvus, the first of the family to attain the consulship, was made a patrician about AD 73 or 74. In the second century, the Aurelii Fulvi obtained the Empire itself, when the consul's grandson, Titus Aurelius Fulvus, was adopted as the successor to Hadrian, becoming the emperor Antoninus Pius. Most of the emperors who followed were born or adopted into the gens, through the end of the Severan dynasty. The surname Fulvus was a common surname, referring to someone with yellowish, yellow-brown, tawny, or strawberry blond hair.

The Aurelii Galli were a family that achieved notability during the second century, attaining the consulship on at least three occasions. Their surname, Gallus, had two common derivations, referring either to a cockerel, or to a Gaul. In the latter case, it might indicate that the first of this family was of Gallic descent, that he was born in Gaul, that he had performed some noteworthy deed in Gaul, or that in some manner he resembled a Gaul.

The Aurelii Symmachi were one of the last great families of the western empire, holding the highest offices of the Roman state during the fourth and fifth centuries. The Symmachi were regarded as members of the old Roman aristocracy, and acquired a reputation for their wisdom and learning.

== Members ==
This list includes abbreviated praenomina. For an explanation of this practice, see filiation.

=== Aurelii Cottae ===
- Gaius Aurelius L. f. C. n. Cotta, consul in 252 and 248 BC, during the First Punic War, he fought against the Carthaginians in Sicily, taking the towns of Himera and Lipara, and receiving a triumph for his victories in the former year. He was censor in 241, and magister equitum to the dictator Gaius Duilius in 231.
- Gaius Aurelius C. f. L. n. Cotta, legate of the consul Claudius Marcellus in 216 BC. (Note: His cognomen is guessed by Badian, thanks to the filiation of Gaius Aurelius Cotta, the consul of 200, which shows that both his father and grandfather were named Gaius.)
- Marcus Aurelius C. f. L. n. Cotta, plebeian aedile in 216 BC. In 212, during the Second Punic War, he served under the consul Appius Claudius Pulcher at Puteoli. He was appointed decemvir sacrorum in 203, and the following year was an ambassador to Philip V of Macedon. He died in 201.
- Gaius Aurelius C. f. C. n. Cotta, praetor urbanus in 202 BC, and consul in 200, carried on the war against the Gauls in Italy. When the enemy was defeated by the praetor Lucius Furius Purpureo, Cotta distracted himself by raiding and plundering the countryside.
- Marcus Aurelius M. f. C. n. Cotta, served as the legate of Lucius Cornelius Scipio Asiaticus during the war against Antiochus III in 189 BC. He brought Antiochus' ambassadors and other representatives of the east to Rome, where he gave his report to the senate.
- Lucius Aurelius C. f. C. n. Cotta, military tribune in 181 BC, was one of the commanders of the third legion in the war against the Ligures, together with Sextus Julius Caesar.
- Lucius Aurelius L. f. C. n. Cotta, as tribune of the plebs in 154 BC, attempted to use his sacrosanctity as tribune to evade his creditors. Consul in 144 BC, he was denied the command against Viriathus through the influence of Scipio Aemilianus, who subsequently accused him of various crimes. Cotta was acquitted, chiefly out of spite against Scipio.
- Lucius Aurelius L. f. L. n. Cotta, consul in 119 BC, attempted to prosecute Gaius Marius, then tribune of the plebs, for a law he had proposed to reduce the influence of the optimates in the comitia. Marius threatened to imprison Cotta, and the senate abandoned the consul's scheme.
- Marcus Aurelius (L. f. L. n.) Cotta, triumvir monetalis in 139 BC. He married Rutilia, the sister of Publius Rutilius Rufus, consul in 105, and their three sons Marcus, Gaius, and Lucius became consuls in 74, 75, and 65 respectively.
- Aurelia L. f. L. n., the wife of Gaius Julius Caesar, proconsul of Asia early in the first century BC, and mother of the dictator Caesar.
- Lucius Aurelius (L. f. L. n.) Cotta, triumvir monetalis in 105 BC and tribune of the plebs circa 103; he tried to obstruct the prosecution of Quintus Servilius Caepio by the tribune Gaius Norbanus, but failed. He was praetor in an uncertain year; Broughton places his praetorship circa 95. Cicero describes him as a mediocre orator, who deliberately presented himself as a rustic.
- Marcus Aurelius M. f. L. n. Cotta, consul in 74 BC, received the province of Bithynia during the war with Mithradates. He was defeated, and lost his entire fleet, for which he blamed his quaestor, Publius Oppius, whom Cicero defended. Cotta himself was later condemned for extortion in his province, on the accusation of Gaius Papirius Carbo.
- Gaius Aurelius M. f. L. n. Cotta, a distinguished orator, praised by Cicero. During the Social War, he had supported the cause of the allies, and was subsequently exiled until 82 BC. Consul in 75, he attempted to reverse one of Sulla's most onerous laws, arousing the ire of the optimates. He was granted a triumph for his successes as proconsul of Gaul, but died from an old wound on the day before the ceremony.
- Lucius Aurelius M. f. L. n. Cotta, as praetor in 70 BC, carried the lex Aurelia iudiciaria, expanding the classes of persons who could serve on juries. He became consul in 65, after accusing the consuls elect of ambitus, and became a target of the First Catilinarian conspiracy. He was censor in 64, but the tribunes of the plebs compelled him to resign. He was an ally of both Cicero and Caesar.
- Marcus Aurelius M. f. M. n. Cotta, son of the consul of 74 BC, upon assuming the toga virilis, avenged his father by charging Carbo, his father's accuser, of extortion in his province, the same crime for which the elder Cotta had been condemned. Probably the same Cotta who as propraetor of Sardinia in 49, fled to Africa before the arrival of Caesar's legate, Quintus Valerius Orca.
- Marcus Aurelius M. f. M. n. Cotta, probably a son of the propraetor Marcus, adopted a son of Marcus Valerius Messalla Corvinus, who became Marcus Aurelius Cotta Maximus Messalinus.
- Marcus Aurelius M. f. M. n. Cotta Maximus Messalinus, son of Marcus Valerius Messalla Corvinus, was adopted into the gens Aurelia. He was consul in AD 20, and an intimate friend of the emperor Tiberius. He gained a reputation for hostility and cruelty, causing a number of leading senators to accuse him of majestas. The emperor, however, defended him in a missive to the senate, whereupon Messalinus was acquitted. He was also the patron of Ovid.
- Aurelius M. f. M. n. Cotta, a nobleman who received an annual stipend from the Emperor Nero in AD 58, because he had dissipated his family estate in profligacy. He was doubtless the son of Marcus Aurelius Cotta Maximus Messalinus.

=== Aurelii Scauri ===
- Gaius Aurelius Scaurus, praetor in 186 BC, was assigned the province of Sardinia.
- Marcus Aurelius M. f. Scaurus, triumvir monetalis in 118 BC, perhaps the same as the consul of 108.
- Marcus Aurelius Scaurus, (Note: Sometimes misidentified as Marcus Aemilius Scaurus; Scaurus was also a cognomen of the Aemilia gens.) consul suffectus in 108 BC. As a legate in Gaul in 105, he was defeated and captured by the Cimbri at the Battle of Arausio. Scaurus was slain by the Cimbric chief, Boiorix, when he warned his captors that they could not hope to defeat Rome.
- Marcus Aurelius (M. f.) Scaurus, a quaestor mentioned in Cicero's oration against Verres.

=== Aurelii Orestides ===
- Lucius Aurelius L. f. L. n. Orestes, consul in 157 BC.
- Lucius Aurelius L. f. L. n. Orestes, consul in 126 BC, was sent against the Sardinians, over whom he triumphed in 122. Gaius Gracchus and Marcus Aurelius Scaurus served under his command. Orestes and his brother, Gaius, were orators mentioned in passing by Cicero.
- Gaius Aurelius L. f. L. n. Orestes, and his brother, Lucius, were orators briefly mentioned by Cicero.
- Lucius Aurelius L. f. L. n. Orestes, consul in 103 BC, with Gaius Marius as his colleague. Orestes died during his year of office.
- Gnaeus Aurelius Orestes, praetor urbanus in 77 BC, issued a decision that was appealed to the consul Mamercus Aemilius Lepidus. Lepidus sustained the appeal, negating Orestes' decision. Broughton identifies him with the consul of 71.
- Gnaeus Aurelius Cn. f. Orestes, adopted by Gnaeus Aufidius, the historian, assuming the name of Gnaeus Aufidius Orestes. After he failed to win election as tribune of the plebs, he succeeded in obtaining the consulship for 71 BC. Cicero, however, suggests that his election was due largely to the lavish gifts that he distributed among the people.
- Aurelia Orestilla, the second wife of Catiline, who reputedly slew his grown son in order to overcome her objection to their marriage. According to Cicero's correspondent, Marcus Caelius Rufus, Aurelia's daughter was betrothed to Quintus Cornificius.

=== Aurelii Fulvi ===
- Titus Aurelius Fulvus, the grandfather of the emperor Antoninus Pius, was legate of the third legion during the reign of Nero, and subsequently a supporter of Vespasian, under whom he served as consul suffectus circa AD 71, and governor of Hispania Citerior from 75 to 78. He was consul for the second time in 85, together with the emperor Domitian. At one time, he was praefectus urbi.
- Titus Aurelius T. f. Fulvus, the father of Antoninus Pius, was consul in AD 89, for the first four months of the year.
- Titus Aurelius T. f. T. n. Fulvus Boionius (Arrius?) Antoninus, (Note: Salomies notes that "Arrius" is attested only in the Historia Augusta, and possibly on brick stamps, but that some scholars attribute the brick stamps to a relative, and therefore Salomies concludes that his full nomenclature was "Titus Aurelius Fulvus Boionius Antoninus.") better known as Antoninus Pius, emperor from AD 138 to 161. He had been consul in AD 120, then distinguished himself as Proconsul of Asia, and was adopted by Hadrian shortly before the emperor's death.
- Marcus Aurelius T. f. T. n. Fulvus Antoninus, a son of Antoninus Pius, who must have died before AD 138, as Antoninus had no living sons when he was adopted by Hadrian.
- Marcus Galerius Aurelius T. f. T. n. Antoninus, another son of Antoninus Pius, must also have died before AD 138.
- Aurelia T. f. T. n. Fadilla, daughter of Antoninus Pius, and wife of Lucius Aelius Lamia Silvanus, died shortly after her father was appointed governor of Asia.
- Anna Galeria T. f. T. n. Faustina, another daughter of Antoninus Pius, married her cousin, Marcus Aurelius, and was empress from AD 161 to her death, about 175. She was noted for her extravagance and intrigues, which the emperor appears to have indulged, or at least tolerated.
- Marcus Aurelius Antoninus, born Marcus Annius Verus, a nephew of Antoninus Pius, by whom he was adopted on the orders of Hadrian in AD 138, and whom he succeeded as emperor from 161 to 180.
- Lucius Aurelius Verus, born Lucius Ceionius Commodus, was adopted by Antoninus Pius upon the latter's adoption by Hadrian in AD 138. He was appointed emperor together with Marcus Aurelius in 161, reigning until his death in 169.
- Annia Aurelia M. f. Galeria Lucilla, daughter of Marcus Aurelius, married the emperor Lucius Verus. When he died young, a rumour began that Lucilla had poisoned him. Her second husband was the general Tiberius Claudius Pompeianus, whom she despised as her inferior. She joined a plot against her brother, the emperor Commodus, but after being detected was banished to Capreae, where she was put to death about AD 183.
- Annia Galeria M. f. Aurelia Faustina, daughter of Marcus Aurelius, and wife of Gnaeus Claudius Severus, consul in AD 167. Their son, Tiberius Claudius Severus Proculus, was consul in 200.
- Titus Aelius Aurelius M. f., son of Marcus Aurelius, probably died young.
- Titus Aurelius M. f. Fulvus Antoninus Geminus, son of Marcus Aurelius and twin brother of Commodus, died at the age of four, circa AD 165.
- Domitia M. f. Faustina, daughter of Marcus Aurelius, apparently died young.
- Lucius Aurelius M. f. Commodus Antoninus, son of Marcus Aurelius, emperor from AD 177 to 192. After a promising beginning, he gave himself over to luxury, self-indulgence, and tyranny. He was assassinated at the end of 192.
- Annia Aurelia M. f. Fadilla, daughter of Marcus Aurelius, married Marcus Peducaeus Plautius Quintillus.
- Vibia Aurelia M. f. Sabina, daughter of Marcus Aurelius, married Lucius Antistius Burrus.

=== Aurelii Galli ===
- Lucius Aurelius Gallus, consul suffectus in an uncertain year between AD 128 and 133.
- Lucius Aurelius Gallus, consul suffectus Ex. Kal. Jul. in AD 146.
- Lucius Aurelius Gallus, consul in AD 174.
- Lucius Aurelius Gallus, consul in AD 198.
- Lucius Aurelius Gallus, governor of Moesia Inferior from AD 201 to about 204.

=== Aurelii Symmachi ===
- Aurelius Valerius Symmachus Tullianus, consul in 330.
- Lucius Aurelius Avianius Symmachus signo Phosphorius, praefectus urbi in AD 364, and consul-designate for 377. He was a superb diplomat, and among the most esteemed members of the senate.
- Quintus Aurelius L. f. Symmachus signo Eusebius, one of the most respected scholars and rhetoricians of the late fourth century, and a passionate defender of Rome's pagan traditions. He was praefectus urbi in AD 384 and consul in 391.
- Quintus Fabius Q. f. L. n. Memmius Symmachus, held a number of high offices, including the quaestorship and praetorship, before becoming proconsul of Africa in AD 415. He was praefectus urbi in AD 418.
- Quintus Aurelius (Q. f. Q. n.) Symmachus, consul in AD 446 with Flavius Aetius.
- Quintus Aurelius Q. f. (Q. n.) Memmius Symmachus, consul in AD 485, and praefectus urbi, was the father-in-law of Boethius.

=== Others ===
- Publius Aurelius Pecuniola, a kinsman of the consul Gaius Aurelius Cotta, under whom he served during the siege of Lipara in 252 BC. As a result of his negligence, his camp was set on fire, and nearly captured. As a punishment, Pecuniola was scourged, and demoted to the rank of legionary.
- Lucius Aurelius, quaestor urbanus in 196 BC.
- Aurelius Opilius, a freedman who became a philosopher, rhetorician, and grammarian, and a friend of Publius Rutilius Rufus, whom he accompanied into exile at Smyrna, around 92 BC.
- Aurelius Cornelius Celsus, a physician, perhaps named Aulus, rather than Aurelius. He probably lived in the time of Augustus, or at the latest in the mid-first century. He employed a scientific approach to medicine, and his treatise, De Medicina, in eight books, still survives.
- Lucius Aurelius Priscus, consul suffectus in AD 67.
- Quintus Aurelius Pactumeius Fronto, consul suffectus in AD 80. He entered office on the Kalends of March, and held the consulate for two months.
- Titus Aurelius Quietus, consul suffectus in AD 82. He served from the Kalends of September, perhaps until the end of the year.
- Aurelia Messalina, the wife of Ceionius Postumius and mother of Clodius Albinus.
- Aurelius, a physician, one of whose prescriptions is quoted by Galen.
- Marcus Aurelius Verianus, governor of Roman Egypt in 188.
- Marcus Aurelius Cleander, a freedman of Commodus, whom the emperor entrusted with the maintenance of his household, and then the imperial bureaucracy. He enriched himself by selling magistracies, but following a grain shortage in AD 190, the praefectus annonae incited a riot against him. The emperor made no effort to defend his favourite, who was put to death to placate the mob.
- Quintus Aurelius Polus Terentianus, governor of Dacia in 193.
- Lucius Aurelius Commodus Pompeianus, consul in AD 209.
- Marcus Aurelius Sebastenus, equestrian governor of Mauretania Tingitana from AD 215 to 217.
- Aurelius Philippus, the tutor of Severus Alexander, who afterward wrote a life of the emperor.
- Lucius Julius Aurelius Septimius Vabalathus Athenodorus, king of the Palmyrene Empire.
- Marcus Aurelius Olympius Nemesianus, an esteemed poet during the reign of the emperor Carus, and the author of Cynegetica, a treatise on hunting with dogs, most of which has been lost. Several fragments of his other works have survived.
- Aurelius Arcadius Charisius, a jurist, who probably flourished during the fourth century.
- Sextus Aurelius Victor, a Latin historian of the fourth century, and the author of several important historical and biographical works. He was governor of Pannonia Secunda under the emperor Julian, and prefect of Rome in AD 389 under Theodosius I.
- Aurelius Clemens Prudentius, a jurist, poet, and Christian philosopher of the late fourth and early fifth century.
- Aurelius Onesimus, a legionary in the Legio I Illyricorum.

== Stemma of the Aurelii Cottae ==
Stemma made from Münzer and Badian.

Legend
Red	Emperor	Orange	Dictator	Yellow	Censor	Green	Consul

C. Aurelius
L. Aurelius
C. Aurelius Cotta cos. 252, 248 cens. 241; mag. eq. 231
C. Aurelius Cotta leg. 216	M. Aurelius Cotta aed. pl. 216
C. Aurelius Cotta cos. 200	M. Aurelius Cotta leg. 189
L. Aurelius Cotta trib. mil. 181
L. Aurelius Cotta cos. 144
L. Aurelius Cotta cos. 119	M. Aurelius Cotta tri. mon. 139	Rutilia
L. Aurelius Cotta pr. c. 90	Aurelia	C. Iulius Caesar pr. c.92	C. Aurelius Cotta cos. 75	M. Aurelius Cotta cos. 74	L. Aurelius Cotta cos. 65, cens. 64
Julius Caesar cos. 59, 48, 46–44 dict. 49–44	M. Aurelius Cotta propr. 49
Augustus; Emperor 27 BC–AD 14	M. Aurelius Cotta
M. Aurelius Cotta; Maximus Messalinus cos. AD 20
Aurelius Cotta

== See also ==
- List of Roman gentes
- Lucius Domitius Aurelianus, emperor from 270 AD to 275 AD.
- Aurelius, one of the Martyrs of Córdoba - see Aurelius and Natalia
- Ambrosius Aurelianus, possible historical basis for King Arthur
- Aurelius of Carthage, a fifth-century Christian saint
- Contarini

== Bibliography ==
=== Ancient sources ===
- Marcus Tullius Cicero, Academica Priora, Brutus, De Domo Sua, De Lege Agraria contra Rullum, De Legibus, De Officiis, De Oratore, Divinatio in Quintum Caecilium, Epistulae ad Atticum, Epistulae ad Familiares, In Catilinam, In Pisonem, In Verrem, Orator ad Marcum Brutum, Philippicae, Pro Fonteio, Pro Murena, Pro Plancio, Pro Sestio.
- Marcus Caelius Rufus, Apud Ciceronis ad Familiares.
- Gaius Julius Caesar, Commentarii de Bello Civili.
- Gaius Sallustius Crispus (Sallust), Bellum Catilinae (The Conspiracy of Catiline), Historiae (The Histories).
- Cornelius Nepos, De Viris Illustribus (On the Lives of Famous Men).
- Quintus Horatius Flaccus (Horace), Satirae (Satires).
- Titus Livius (Livy), History of Rome.
- Marcus Velleius Paterculus, Compendium of Roman History.
- Valerius Maximus, Factorum ac Dictorum Memorabilium (Memorable Facts and Sayings).
- Quintus Asconius Pedianus, Commentarius in Oratio Ciceronis In Cornelio (Commentary on Cicero's Oration In Cornelio).
- Lucius Junius Moderatus Columella, De Re Rustica.
- Gaius Plinius Secundus (Pliny the Elder), Historia Naturalis (Natural History).
- Sextus Julius Frontinus, Strategemata (Stratagems).
- Marcus Fabius Quintilianus (Quintilian), Institutio Oratoria (Institutes of Oratory).
- Publius Cornelius Tacitus, Annales, Historiae, De Origine et Situ Germanorum (The Origin and Situation of the Germans, or "Germania").
- Gaius Suetonius Tranquillus, De Vita Caesarum (Lives of the Caesars, or The Twelve Caesars), De Illustribus Grammaticis (On the Illustrious Grammarians).
- Appianus Alexandrinus (Appian), Bella Mithridatica (The Mithridatic Wars), Bellum Civile (The Civil War).
- Aelius Galenus (Galen), De Compositione Medicamentorum Secundum Locos Conscriptorum (On the Composition of Medications According to the Place Prescribed).
- Cassius Dio, Roman History.
- Herodianus, History of the Empire from the Death of Marcus.
- Aelius Lampridius, Aelius Spartianus, Flavius Vopiscus, Julius Capitolinus, Trebellius Pollio, and Vulcatius Gallicanus, Historia Augusta (Augustan History).
- Eutropius, Breviarium Historiae Romanae (Abridgement of the History of Rome).
- Sextus Aurelius Victor, De Caesaribus (On the Caesars), De Viris Illustribus (On Famous Men).
- Ammianus Marcellinus, Res Gestae.
- Codex Theodosianus.
- Quintus Aurelius Symmachus, Epistulae.
- Paulus Orosius, Historiarum Adversum Paganos (History Against the Pagans).
- Digesta, or Pandectae (The Digest).
- Paulus, Epitome de Sex. Pompeio Festo de Significatu Verborum (Epitome of Festus' De Significatu Verborum).
- Joannes Zonaras, Epitome Historiarum (Epitome of History).

=== Modern sources ===
- Jan Gruter, Inscriptiones Antiquae Totius Orbis Romani (Ancient Inscriptions from the Whole Roman World), Heidelberg (1603).
- Ludovico Antonio Muratori, Novus Thesaurus Veterum Inscriptionum (New Treasury of Ancient Inscriptions), Milan (1739–42).
- Johann Christian Wernsdorf, Poëtae Latini Minores (Minor Latin Poets), Altenburg, Helmstedt (1780–1799).
- Joseph Hilarius Eckhel, Doctrina Numorum Veterum (The Study of Ancient Coins, 1792–1798).
- Dictionary of Greek and Roman Biography and Mythology, William Smith, ed., Little, Brown and Company, Boston (1849).
- Theodor Mommsen et alii, Corpus Inscriptionum Latinarum (The Body of Latin Inscriptions, abbreviated CIL), Berlin-Brandenburgische Akademie der Wissenschaften (1853–present).
- René Cagnat et alii, L'Année épigraphique (The Year in Epigraphy, abbreviated AE), Presses Universitaires de France (1888–present).
- George Davis Chase, "The Origin of Roman Praenomina", in Harvard Studies in Classical Philology, vol. VIII (1897).
- Friedrich Münzer, Roman Aristocratic Parties and Families, translated by Thérèse Ridley, Johns Hopkins University Press, 1999 (originally published in 1920).
- T. Robert S. Broughton, The Magistrates of the Roman Republic, American Philological Association (1952).
- Ernst Badian, Studies in Greek and Roman History, Blackwell (1964).
- Anthony R. Birley, Marcus Aurelius, B. T. Batsford, London (1966).
- Geza Alföldy, Fasti Hispanienses, F. Steiner, Wiesbaden (1969).
- Michael Crawford, Roman Republican Coinage, Cambridge University Press (1974, 2001).
- T. P. Wiseman, "Legendary Genealogies in Late-Republican Rome", Greece & Rome, Second Series, Vol. 21, No. 2 (Oct., 1974), pp. 153–164.
- Guido Bastianini, "Lista dei prefetti d'Egitto dal 30^{a} al 299^{p}" (List of the Prefects of Egypt from 30 BC to AD 299), in Zeitschrift für Papyrologie und Epigraphik, vol. 17 (1975).
- Dicționar de istorie veche a României (Dictionary of Ancient Romanian History), Editura Științifică și Enciclopedică (1976).
- Paul A. Gallivan, "Some Comments on the Fasti for the Reign of Nero", in Classical Quarterly, vol. 24, pp. 290–311 (1974), "The Fasti for A.D. 70–96", in Classical Quarterly, vol. 31, pp. 186–220 (1981).
- Brian W. Jones, The Emperor Domitian, Routledge, London (1992).
- Benet Salway, "What’s in a Name? A Survey of Roman Onomastic Practice from c. 700 B.C. to A.D. 700", in Journal of Roman Studies, vol. 84, pp. 124–145 (1994).
- J.E.H. Spaul, "Governors of Tingitana", in Antiquités Africaines, vol. 30 (1994).
- John C. Traupman, The New College Latin & English Dictionary, Bantam Books, New York (1995).
- Olli Salomies, "Adoptive and Polyonymous Nomenclature in the Roman Empire—Some Addenda", in Epigrafie e Ordine Senatorio, 30 Anni Dopo, Edizioni Quasar, Rome, pp. 511–536 (2014).
