= Elkland, Pennsylvania =

Borough in Pennsylvania, US

- Borough
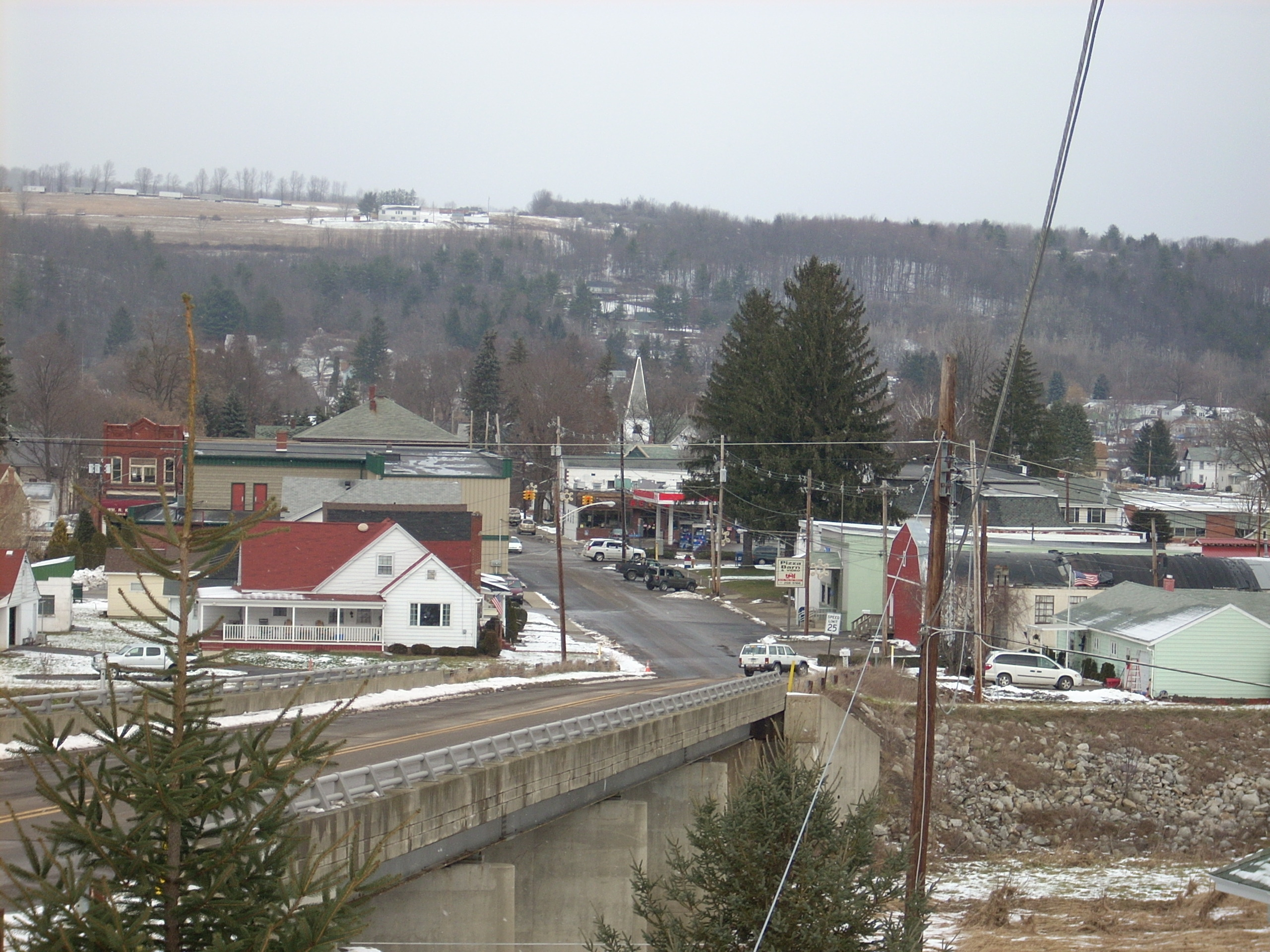
- Elkand as seen from the Cowanesque River

- Location of Elkland in Tioga County, Pennsylvania.

- Location within the U.S. state of Pennsylvania Elkland (the United States)
- Coordinates: 41°59′07″N 77°18′50″W
- Country: United States
- State: Pennsylvania
- County: Tioga
- Settled: 1806
- Incorporated (borough): 1850

Area
  - Total: 2.61 sq mi (6.77 km^{2})
  - Land: 2.61 sq mi (6.77 km^{2})
  - Water: 0 sq mi (0.00 km^{2})
- Elevation: 1,132 ft (345 m)

Population (2020)
  - Total: 1,827
  - Density: 699.0/sq mi (269.89/km^{2})
- Time zone: Eastern (EST)
  - Summer (DST): EDT
- ZIP code: 16920
- Area code: 814
- FIPS code: 42-23152
- Website: https://elklandborough.com/

Elkland is a borough in Tioga County, Pennsylvania, United States. The population was 1,827 at the 2020 census.

== Geography ==
Elkland is located at 41°59′24″N 77°18′40″W (41.989863, -77.311238).

According to the United States Census Bureau, the borough has a total area of 2.3 square miles (6.0 km^{2}), all land. It is located along the Cowanesque River.

== History ==
The Parkhurst Memorial Presbyterian Church was added to the National Register of Historic Places in 2012.

=== Elkland Borough ===
In 1814 the township of Elkland was organized. Its territory, taken from Delmar Township, extended along the New York state line from the ninety-third to the one hundred and fourth mile-stone—a distance of eleven miles (18 km). It extended north and south a distance of ten miles (16 km) and embraced within its boundaries the present borough of Elkland and townships of Nelson, Osceola, all of Farmington, and parts of Lawrence, Deerfield, and Middlebury townships. In December 1816, a part of the township of Lawrence was taken from it, and in September 1822, another portion of its territory went to Middlebury township. In February 1830, the territory of the township of Farmington was taken from it. Those several reductions confined it to a narrow strip, about eight miles (13 km) long, from east to west, by two and three-fourths miles wide, from north to south. By an act of the legislature, approved April 10, 1849, its territory was still further reduced by the creation of the borough of Elkland, to which, from time to time, additions have been made. In January 1857, all that part of the township not embraced in Elkland borough limits, lying west of a line extending through the center of that borough, from north to south, was erected into the township of Osceola, and in December 1857, all lying east of the same line became the township of Nelson, and Elkland township passed out of existence. By the subsequent extension of the Elkland borough limits south of the Cowanesque river, the townships of Osceola and Nelson both suffered material reductions of area. There is still left, however, a narrow strip between the southern boundary of Elkland and the northern boundary Farmington township, the western half of which belongs to Osceola Township, and the eastern half to the township of Nelson. Some years ago a movement was afoot to annex this strip to Elkland borough and thus give it and Osceola and Nelson townships more symmetrical boundaries, but for some reason the annexation was not made.

=== Pioneer Settlers ===
A man named Baker Pierce, who died in 1815, and whose remains were buried in the old pioneer graveyard at Osceola, appears to have been the first settler within the boundaries of Elkland borough. Just when he settled or how long he remained cannot now be ascertained, but it must have been during the earlier years of the first decade of the present century. The next to settle was the Taylor family, who located at Barney Hill. The family consisted of Mrs. Permelia Taylor and her three sons, Ebenezer, Philip and Mitchell, who emigrated from the Delaware Water Gap, New Jersey, to the Wyoming valley, thence to Pipe Creek, below Owego, from which place, in 1806, they came to the Cowanesque valley. Ebenezer and Philip soon afterward removed to Osceola. The latter, his mother and his brother, Mitchell, all died before 1815, and were buried at Barney Hill. In 1882, their resting place being disturbed by the building of the Addison and Pennsylvania railroad, Capt. Charles R. Taylor and Charles Tubbs—descendants in the fourth generation of Mrs. Permelia Taylor—removed their remains to the cemetery at Osceola.

It appears that William Courtright acquired title to the land first bought and settled on by Philip Taylor, which, in 1814, he conveyed to Lintsford Coates. The Coates family came early, as early, so it has been stated, as 1806. In 1808, however, Timothy Coates Sr. acquired the title to 170 acres (0.69 km^{2}) of land, situated between the lands of Cyprian Wright and those of Amasa Culver, and covered by warrant No. 233 within the limits of what is now Nelson borough, and later he and his son, Lintsford, bought land and became residents of Elkland. The exact year is, however, difficult to ascertain. Daniel Holiday was here previous to 1810, in which year his son, Daniel, now a resident of Holidaytown, Middlebury township, was born.

In March 1811, came a colony from Elmira, New York and Southport, New York, consisting of Samuel Tubbs Sr., his sons, Samuel, James and Benjamin, and his sons-in-law, John Ryon Jr., David Hammond, and Martin Stevens. The members of this colony became the owners and occupants of all the land from Barney Hill on the east to the Stull farm on the west, including the Davenport Island and farm on the south side of the river. John Ryon Jr. and his brother James settled in the center of Elkland, which became known as Ryonsville. John Ryon Sr., who joined the settlement later, was the first postmaster of the village and resided there until his death in 1832. John Ryon Jr. early became a prominent and leading spirit. He was elected a justice of the peace in 1816, a member of the legislature in 1822 and 1823, and a member of the state senate in 1824. He was the first merchant of the village and its most prominent citizen. In 1848, he removed to Lawrenceville, PA, where he died July 22, 1859. Samuel Tubbs settled on what is now known as the Dorrance farm and soon became identified with the material growth of the village. David Hammond settled on the old Hammond homestead now owned by Mrs. C. L. Pattison.

The names given are those of the pioneers who settled within the borough limits, so far as it has been possible to ascertain them. In time the village took the name of Elkland, growing steadily year by year. it is now one of the most prosperous and progressive boroughs in the county.

=== Village Growth ===
As early as 1815, Col. Samuel Tubbs and his sons excavated a mill race around the south side of what afterward became known as Davenport Island and erected a saw-mill and a grist-mill. Col. Lemuel Davenport, who came about 1820, or soon after, acquired this property and owned and operated the mills. In 1870, they were purchased by Hon. John W. Ryon, of Pottsville, Pennsylvania. In 1885, the grist-mill was changed to a roller-mill. In 1890, the machinery, etc., was removed to a site north of the Fall Brook railroad at the head of Parkhurst street, and the present mill was erected. In 1894, a grain elevator with a capacity of 14,000 bushels of grain was built. During the latter part of 1895, the mill was completely remodeled, and the latest improved machinery was added. It is now a 500-barrel mill and is one of the best equipped in the State. John W. Ryon Jr. is in charge. William Martindell is the superintendent and head miller. About 1840, D. B. Schoff erected a water-power saw-mill on the river in the southern part of the village and operated it for a number of years. It was torn down in 1869 by George Dorrance.

The first store in the village was opened about 1824 or 1825 by John Ryon Jr. and Robert Tubbs. In 1828, Joel Parkhurst, who had previously been in business with his brother in Lawrenceville, came to Elkland, joined with and later bought them out. He became within a few years, not only a leading business man, but the wealthiest citizen of the Cowanesque valley, maintaining at the same time a well-deserved reputation for liberality, enterprise, and public spirit. In 1832, George L. and Samuel Ryon opened a store and continued in business until 1843. About 1833, Timothy S. and David Coates engaged in merchandising and lumbering, continuing until 1854, when Clark Kimball of Osceola, succeeded David. Other changes occurred previous to Mr. Coates's retirement in 1859 or 1860.

As the country became more settled, the village grew slowly, new stores being started, a school house built, a church organized, and such other trade and industrial enterprises set on foot as the condition and necessities of the people demanded. In the winter of 1839–40, James Tubbs, father of Hon. Charles Tubbs, of Osceola, and who is still living, taught a school in the village. Recently in a reminiscent article published in the Elkland Journal, he described this school and the pupils who attended and closed with the following description of the village:

"At the time of my school Elkland was a mere hamlet, not even a four corners, as there was no street from Skinner's store to the river. On what is now Buffalo street two families lived—Anson Blackman's and Alvinzi Foote's. Stanley, the tailor, had just occupied the house in which Dr. Rockwell now lives. Martin Stevens, carpenter, and Asaph Johnson lived on the farm where the Postal Telegraph Company's office is, and Benjamin Tubbs on the lower part of the Dorrance farm. The leading citizen was John Ryon. He had been representative and senator, and at the time of my school had a seat upon the bench as associate judge. He gave the land where the school house was built; the land for the cemetery, and the site for the Presbyterian church, which had then been built about one year. his son, John W., has become my most distinguished scholar, having been a member of Congress. Elisha B. Benedict was the physician of the place, and Rev. Octavius Fitch, the Presbyterian minister. Joel Parkhurst, who settled in Elkland eleven years previously, kept a store on the site of the Journal office, and was the postmaster. The mail arrived twice a week at the postoffice. There was no bridge across the river.

=== Later years ===
The Elkland Tannery was established about 1851 by James Hancock on the south bank of the Cowanesque River. He was soon succeeded by S. G. Tabor & Son. In 1853, Joel Parkhurst acquired the property, which he continued to own until 1873, when he sold it to Joseph Cornelius. He owned and operated it in connection with his sons until 1893, when it passed into the hands of Proctor, Hunt & Co., of Boston, Massachusetts, Mr. Cornelius retaining an interest in the business. In January 1893, the tannery was destroyed by fire and rebuilt on the present site north of the Fall Brook railroad, beginning operations November 11, 1893.

Decker & Metcalf's Sash, Door and Blind Factory was established about 1857. They ran it nearly twenty years. The property had various owners afterwards, finally falling into the hands of C. L. Pattison who removed the plant north of the railroads and incorporated it with the furniture factory.

The Cowanesque Valley Oil Company was incorporated in July 1877, the incorporators being Garrett W. Benson, Olean, New York, and John Parkhurst, Charles L. Pattison, Benjamin Dorrance, and J. C. Edwards, of Elkland. An oil well was sunk on the Hammond place southwest of the borough. Oil and gas were both found, but in limited quantities.

The Elkland Furniture Association (Limited) was incorporated March 25, 1882, by Charles L. Pattison, William L. Simmons and Abram Coon, with a capital stock of $6,287.34. Its object was the manufacture and vending of furniture of every description. The plant was installed in ample buildings north of the railroad, and a large business soon built up. In 1890, one hundred hands were employed. The factory was destroyed by fire January 7, 1893. A movement to rebuild was immediately set on foot but was not successful.

The Elkland Manufacturing Company, manufacturers of toys and novelties, was established in Elkland in January 1887. Charles W. Crandall, the superintendent, was the son of Charles Martin Crandall, known as the maker of Crandall's building blocks and grandson of Asa Crandall who ran a furniture factory in Covington in 1840. Mr. Crandall was in the same business in Montrose, Pennsylvania, where his large factory burned August 27, 1886, involving a loss of $46,000. From sixty to seventy-five men were constantly employed, the annual output amounting to $40,000. Toys and novelties were shipped to all parts of the world.

== Demographics ==
Historical population
Census	Pop.	Note	%±
1860	312		—
1870	332		6.4%
1880	470		41.6%
1890	1,006		114.0%
1900	1,109		10.2%
1910	1,175		6.0%
1920	1,703		44.9%
1930	1,978		16.1%
1940	2,400		21.3%
1950	2,326		−3.1%
1960	2,189		−5.9%
1970	1,942		−11.3%
1980	1,974		1.6%
1990	1,849		−6.3%
2000	1,786		−3.4%
2010	1,821		2.0%
2020	1,827		0.3%
2021 (est.)	1,816	▼	−0.6%

As of the census of 2000, there were 1,786 people, 755 households, and 493 families residing in the borough. The population density was 759.6 inhabitants per square mile (293.3/km^{2}). There were 830 housing units at an average density of 353.0 per square mile (136.3/km^{2}). The racial makeup of the borough was 98.32% White, 0.95% African American, 0.17% Native American, 0.06% from other races, and 0.50% from two or more races. Hispanic or Latino of any race were 0.84% of the population.

There were 755 households, out of which 29.0% had children under the age of 18 living with them, 48.7% were married couples living together, 12.2% had a female householder with no husband present, and 34.6% were non-families. 31.5% of all households were made up of individuals, and 17.2% had someone living alone who was 65 years of age or older. The average household size was 2.36 and the average family size was 2.91.

In the borough the population was spread out, with 24.1% under the age of 18, 7.4% from 18 to 24, 26.8% from 25 to 44, 22.3% from 45 to 64, and 19.4% who were 65 years of age or older. The median age was 39 years. For every 100 females there were 89.8 males. For every 100 females age 18 and over, there were 83.2 males.

The median income for a household in the borough was $26,034, and the median income for a family was $33,523. Males had a median income of $26,983 versus $20,743 for females. The per capita income for the borough was $14,470. About 7.6% of families and 15.1% of the population were below the poverty line, including 17.3% of those under age 18 and 11.0% of those age 65 or over.

== Education ==
It is in the Northern Tioga School District.

The early schools in Elkland, as in other places throughout the county, were supported by subscription, and until the building of the first school house in 1827, were taught in any house that could be secured for the purpose. The year when the first school was opened has not been ascertained, but it was probably as early as 1814 or 1816. Among the first teachers were Henry Womer, Miss Mary Ryon and Harriet B. Wright. Miss Wright, who afterwards became the wife of Ira Bulkley, taught a term of thirteen weeks beginning June 14, 1824, in an old log dwelling house "located where C. L. Pattison now resides." She had eighteen pupils—eight boys and ten girls. They were John, Amariah and Hannah (wife of George L. Byon) Hammond; Esther Wright (second wife of Ira Bulkley); Elizabeth Cook (wife of Orsemus Rathbone); Willis and Nancy (wife of Brockhurst L. Baker) Hammond; George L. and Harris T. Ryon; Benson, Elizabeth and Charles Tubbs; Maria Coates (wife of Lorenzo Cook); Edward, Charlotte and Hester Buck; Phebe Mascho, who died young, and her brother Charles; and a girl named Rifle, who lived in the family of John Ryon Sr. Miss Wright's pay for teaching was "calculated at one dollar per week, or one bushel of good merchantable wheat." In 1892 her sister Esther, one of her pupils, who became the second wife of Ira Bulkley, dictated for publication an article which appeared in the Elkland Journal, in which she said:

Elkland at that time, did not show signs of becoming a village. It had no tavern, nor store, nor shop of any kind—not even a distillery. There was no church in the Cowanesque valley, and the itinerant Methodist ministers who passed this way once in six weeks, held preaching services in some barn in the summer season. John Ryon Sr. was postmaster and kept the office at his dwelling house, at which the mail arrived by carrier on horseback, once a week (Tuesdays). "John Ryon, Esq.," as my father wrote his name among the patrons of my sister's school, was at that time a member of the state senate, deservedly popular, a most generous and obliging gentleman.

In 1827 the first school building was erected. It is still standing just west of the Presbyterian church and is occupied as a dwelling by James Brocksley. It was built by Rodney Shaw, afterwards a well known citizen of Mansfield, PA. At the raising there was used one and one-half gallons of whiskey, bought of H. Freeborn, of Shaver's Point—now Lawrenceville—for fifty cents. This school house was also used as a church until 1835. It was built by subscription. One of the early teachers here after the adoption of the public school system was James Tubbs, who taught in the winter of 1839–40. in the article already quoted from, he says: "I had no blackboard. My only classes were in spelling and reading. Grammar was not a branch of study in my school. In arithmetic I had no class. Each student began and ciphered as far as he or she could in the science of numbers with my assistance. In teaching geography the same method was pursued. Considerable attention was given to penmanship."

The second school house was built in 1855, and was a two-story frame, with rooms for two departments. In 1876 Joel Parkhurst proposed to give the district a new brick school house, costing $4,000, provided the people would raise a fund of $1,500, to be placed at interest and the interest used to keep the house in order and purchase apparatus. The offer was accepted and the building erected. It ranks as third among the school houses of the county. Prof. M. F. Cass has been principal of this school since 1891, and has proven himself an able, efficient and popular educator.

== Notable people ==
- Ray T. Stull - ceramic engineer and professor at the University of Illinois
