= Ray T. Stull =

American ceramic engineer (1875–1944)

- Born: Ray Thomas Stull; March 2, 1875; Elkland, Pennsylvania, U.S.
- Died: January 6, 1944 (aged 68); Washington, D.C., U.S.
- Education: Ohio State University, M.E. 1902
- Occupations: Ceramic engineer and academic
- Employer(s): American Terracotta and Ceramics Company; University of Illinois; United States Bureau of Mines; Central of Georgia Railway; United States Bureau of Standards

Ray Thomas Stull (March 2, 1875 – January 6, 1944) was an American academic and ceramic engineer. Stull was a professor and head of ceramic engineering at the University of Illinois. He was chief of the heavy clay section of the United States Bureau of Standards, chief ceramist of the United States Bureau of Mines, and superintendent of its Ceramic Experiment Station at Ohio State University. In 1912, he created the Stull Map, still used by ceramists to understand and predict the properties of fired glazes.

== Early life ==
Stull was born on March 2, 1875, in Elkland, Pennsylvania. His parents were Mary and David W. Stull. Stull attended primary and secondary schools in Elkland, Pennsylvania, graduating from Elkland High School. He then attended the Mansfield Normal School in Mansfield, Pennsylvania from 1896 to 1897.

He graduated from Ohio State University with an M.E. degree in ceramic engineering in 1902. He studied minerals at the graduate level at the University of Illinois from 1907 to 1915.

== Career ==
After college, Stull worked as a chemist for the American Terra Cotta and Ceramics Company in Terra Cotta, Illinois, from 1902 to 1904. He became the superintendent of the Mount Savage Enamel Brick Works in 1904. In 1907, Stull became the superintendent of the Streiger Terra Cotta and Pottery Works in San Francisco, California

Later in 1907, Stull became a professor of ceramic engineering at the University of Illinois. He was also the acting head of the Ceramic Engineering Department from 1910 to 1915. In this capacity, he lobbied to secure funding for a kiln house and a new building for the department. He also oversaw increated enrollment in the program and the addition of graduate students.

In 1912, he created the Stull Map, still used by ceramists to understand and predict the properties of fired glazes. The map was originally published as part of his article, "Influences of Variable Silica and Alumina on Porcelain Glazes of Constant RO" in the Transactions of the American Ceramic Society. While at the University of Illinois, Stull helped establish and was the first faculty advisor of Keramos, a professional fraternity for ceramic engineering; he became an honorary member of the fraternity on February 10, 1915.

Stull worked as a ceramic engineer for the Dunn Wire-Cut Lug Brick Company in Conneaut, Ohio, from 1915 to 1917. From August 1917 to 1923, he was the chief ceramist of the United States Bureau of Mines and superintendent of its Ceramic Experiment Station at Ohio State University. Stull worked for the Central of Georgia Railway in Atlanta as an assistant general industrial agent from 1923 to 1925. From 1925 to 1927, he was a consultant to the ceramic industry and to the Central of Georgia Railway. He was president of the Georgia White Brick Company in 1926.

Stull was a senior ceramic engineer and the chief of the heavy clay section of the United States Bureau of Standards in Washington, D.C., from September 1927 until he died. While there, he conducted research related to glazes and enamel brick.

Stull was the author or co-author of more than forty technical publications. He held two United States patents. He was a charter fellow in the American Ceramic Society and the society's president in 1919. He was also a member of the Founders Group of the National Institute of Ceramic Engineers.

== Honors ==
Stull was a charter fellow in the American Ceramic Society. Stull was also a member of the Sigma Xi science and engineering honor society and was an honorary member of the Illinois Clay Manufacturers. In 1940, the fourth issue of Illinois Ceramist was dedicated to Stull.

On November 6, 1948, the Department of Ceramic Engineering at the University of Illinois received a terra cotta and glass plaque honoriing Stull from his former students and associates.

== Personal life ==
Stull married Lena Taylor of Mansfield, Pennsylvania in 1903. They had a son and two daughters: Harry David Stull, Frederica May Stull, and Frances Stull. Their last home together was at 3511 Davenport Street N.W. in Washington, D.C. He was a member of the Masons, Acacia Fraternity, and Alpha Chi Sigma professional fraternity for chemistry.

Stull died on January 6, 1944, in his home in Washington, D.C., at the age of 68. He was buried in Fort Lincoln Cemetery.
