= List of Alpha Chi Sigma members =

This is a listing of notable alumni and honorary members of Alpha Chi Sigma professional chemistry fraternity.

== Nobel Prize in chemistry ==
- Carolyn Bertozzi, Sigma 2001 (2022), "for the development of click chemistry and bioorthogonal chemistry"
- Herbert C. Brown, Beta Nu 1960 (1979), "for [his] development of the use of boron-containing compounds into important reagents in organic synthesis"
- Elias James Corey, Zeta 1953 (1990), "for developing new ways to synthesize complex molecules ordinarily found in nature"
- Pete Debye, Tau 1940 (1936), "for his contributions to our knowledge of molecular structure through his investigations on dipole moments and the diffraction of X-rays and electrons in gases"
- Paul Flory, Tau 1950 (1974), "for his fundamental achievements, both theoretical and experimental, in the physical chemistry of the macromolecules"
- Richard F. Heck, Beta Gamma 1950 (2010), "for palladium-catalyzed cross couplings in organic synthesis"
- Willard Libby, Sigma 1941 (1960), "for his method to use carbon-14 for age determination in archaeology, geology, geophysics, and other branches of science"
- William Lipscomb, Alpha Gamma 1939 (1976), "for his studies on the structure of boranes illuminating problems of chemical bonding"
- Alan MacDiarmid, Alpha 1951 (2000), "for the discovery and development of conductive polymers"
- Rudolph A. Marcus, Zeta 1955 (1992), "for his contributions to the theory of electron transfer reactions in chemical systems"
- Robert Bruce Merrifield, Beta Gamma 1944 (1984), "for his development of methodology for chemical synthesis on a solid matrix"
- Lars Onsager, Chi 1950 (1968), "for the discovery of the reciprocal relations bearing his name, which are fundamental for the thermodynamics of irreversible processes"
- Linus Pauling, Sigma 1940 (1954), "for his research into the nature of the chemical bond and its application to the elucidation of the structure of complex substances"
- Glenn T. Seaborg, Beta Gamma 1935 (1951), "for [his] discoveries in the chemistry of the transuranium elements"
- Vincent du Vigneaud, Zeta 1930 (1955), "for his work on biochemically important sulfur compounds, especially for the first synthesis of a polypeptide hormone"

== Nobel Prize in physiology or medicine ==
- Edward Adelbert Doisy, Zeta 1943 (1943), "for his discovery of the chemical nature of vitamin K"
- George H. Hitchings, Omicron 1929 (1988), "for [his] discoveries of important Principles for Drug Treatment"
- Robert W. Holley, Zeta 1940 (1968), "for [his] interpretation of the genetic code and its functions in protein synthesis"
- Paul Lauterbur, Gamma 1949 (2003), "for their discoveries concerning magnetic resonance imaging"
- E. L. Tatum, Alpha 1930 (1958), "for [his] discovery that genes act by regulating definite chemical events"

== Nobel Prize in physics ==
- Raymond Davis Jr., Alpha Rho 1935 (2002), "for pioneering contributions to astrophysics, in particular for the detection of cosmic neutrinos"

== Nobel Prize in peace ==
- Linus Pauling, Sigma 1940 (1962), "for warning of the dangers of radioactive fallout in nuclear weapons testing and war"

== Priestley Medal ==
- Roger Adams, Zeta 1912, (1946), developed Adams' catalyst, president of the American Chemical Society, president of the American Association for the Advancement of Science
- James B. Conant, Omicron 1912, (1944), an early contributor to physical organic chemistry, president of Harvard University, oversaw the Manhattan Project, winner of the Presidential Medal of Freedom
- Farrington Daniels, Beta 1908, (1957). 1953 president of the American Chemical Society, solar and nuclear energy pioneer
- M. Frederick Hawthorne, Beta Delta 1949 (2008) noted boron chemist who was the director of the International Institute of Nano and Molecular Medicine at the University of Missouri.
- Joel Henry Hildebrand, Sigma 1913, (1962), replaced nitrogen in scuba tanks with helium and oxygen, winner of virtually every chemical award except the Nobel Prize.
- Darleane C. Hoffman, Sigma 1988, (2000), also a winner of the ACS Award in Nuclear Chemistry and the US Medal of Science
- Warren K. Lewis, Alpha Zeta 1925, (1947), the "Father of Modern Chemical Engineering" who introduced the concept of the unit operation

== Other notables ==
- Arnold Beckman, Zeta 1921, inventor of pH meter and ultraviolet spectrometer, winner of the National Medal of Technology and the National Medal of Science
- Wallace Carothers, Zeta 1926, inventor of nylon and neoprene
- F. Albert Cotton, Beta Eta 1978, noted transition metal chemist
- Frederick Gardner Cottrell, Sigma 1917, director of the US Bureau of Mines
- Mary L. Good, Beta Phi 1976, 1993 Under Secretary of Technology, 1987 President of the American Chemical Society
- Gilbert N. Lewis, Sigma 1913, known for dot diagrams of bonding, thermodynamic activity, and acid/base theory
- Thomas Midgley Jr., Alpha Delta 1936, inventor of Freon
- Donna Nelson, Beta Nu 1982, 2016 American Chemical Society president and science advisor for the television show Breaking Bad
- Ray T. Stull, professor and head of ceramic engineering at the University of Illinois; chief of the heavy clay section of the United States Bureau of Standards and chief ceramist of the United States Bureau of Mines
