= Nelson Township, Pennsylvania =

Township in Pennsylvania, US

Coordinates: 41°59′00″N 77°13′59″W

- Township
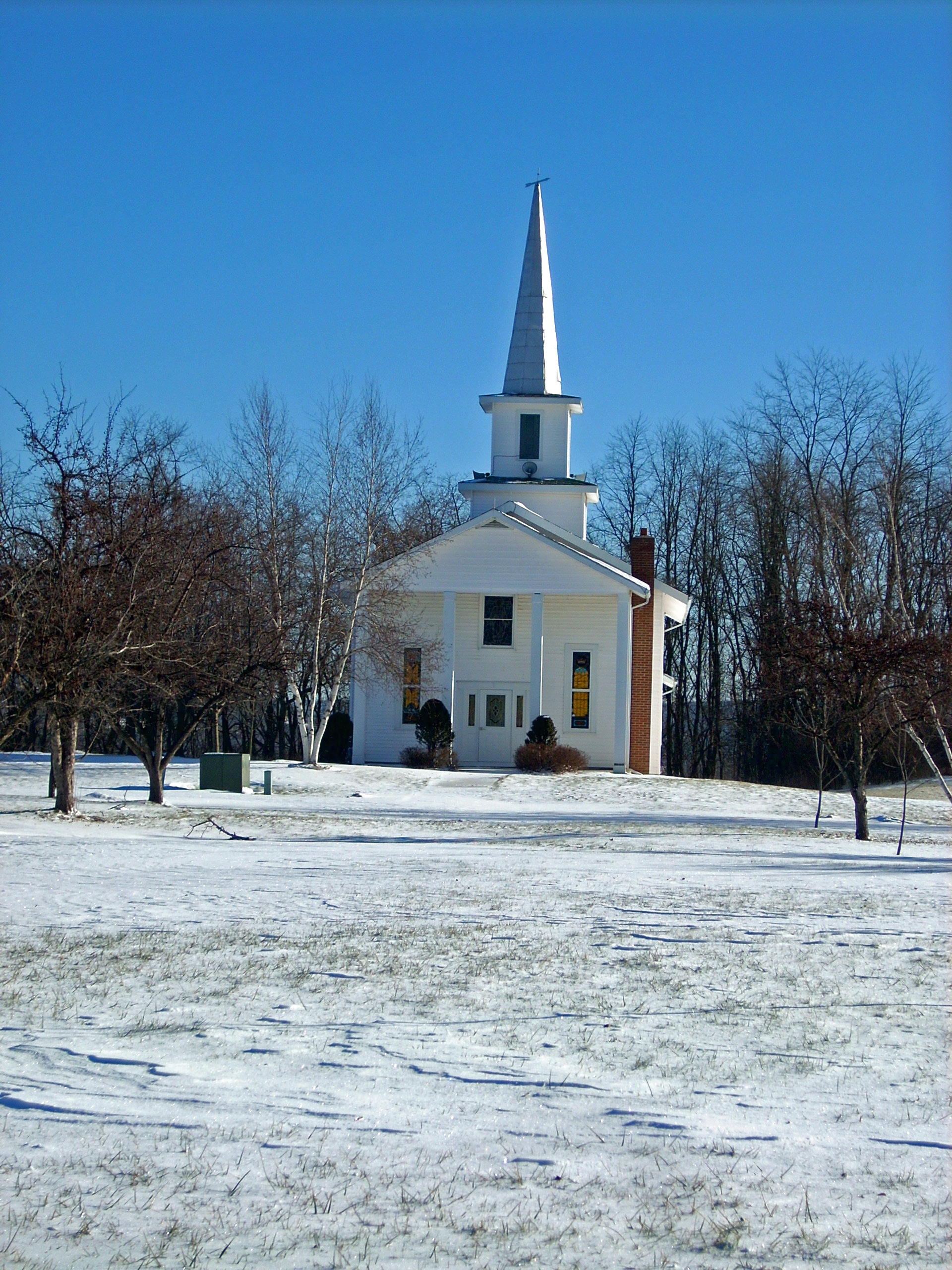
- United Church of Nelson

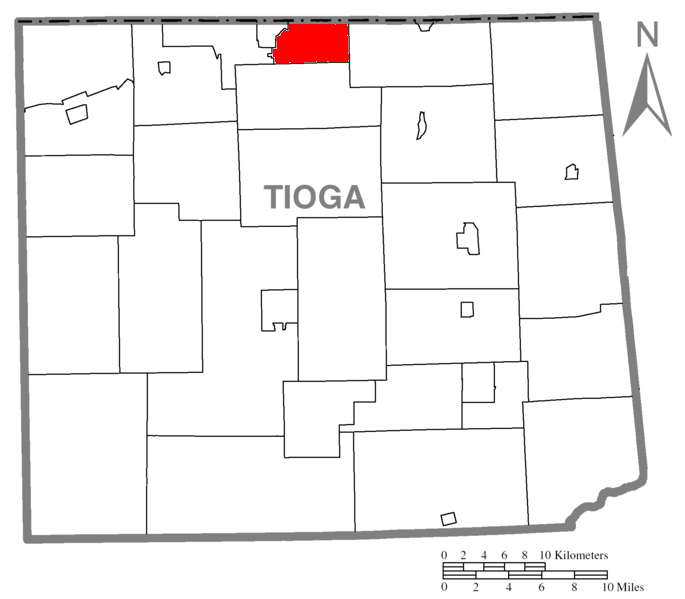
- Map of Tioga County Highlighting Nelson Township

- Map of Pennsylvania highlighting Tioga County
- Country: United States
- State: Pennsylvania
- County: Tioga
- Settled: 1800
- Incorporated: 1857

Area
  - Total: 11.23 sq mi (29.08 km^{2})
  - Land: 11.22 sq mi (29.05 km^{2})
  - Water: 0.012 sq mi (0.03 km^{2})

Population (2020)
  - Total: 546 ▼
  - Estimate (2023): 546
  - Density: 49.8/sq mi (19.24/km^{2})
- Time zone: Eastern Time Zone (North America)
  - Summer (DST): EDT
- FIPS code: 42-117-52960

Historical population
Census	Pop.	Note	%±
2000	587		—
2010	571		−2.7%
2020	546		−4.4%
2023 (est.)	546		0.0%
U.S. Decennial Census

Nelson Township is a township in Tioga County, Pennsylvania, United States. The population was 546 at the 2020 census.

== Geography ==
According to the United States Census Bureau, the town has a total area of 11.3 square miles (29.2 km^{2}) of which, 11.3 square miles (29.2 km^{2}) is land and 0.09% is water.

Nelson Township is bordered by the Town of Tuscarora in Steuben County, New York to the north, Lawrence Township to the east, Farmington Township to the south and Osceola Township and Elkland to the west.

== Demographics ==
As of the census of 2000, there were 587 people, 231 households, and 176 families residing in the township. The population density was 52.0 inhabitants per square mile (20.1/km^{2}). There were 252 housing units at an average density of 22.3/sq mi (8.6/km^{2}). The racial makeup of the township was 98.47% White, 0.17% African American, 0.17% Native American, and 1.19% from two or more races.

There were 231 households, out of which 30.7% had children under the age of 18 living with them, 56.7% were married couples living together, 15.6% had a female householder with no husband present, and 23.8% were non-families. 20.8% of all households were made up of individuals, and 10.0% had someone living alone who was 65 years of age or older. The average household size was 2.54 and the average family size was 2.90.

In the township the population was spread out, with 26.2% under the age of 18, 4.9% from 18 to 24, 28.8% from 25 to 44, 22.5% from 45 to 64, and 17.5% who were 65 years of age or older. The median age was 37 years. For every 100 females, there were 91.8 males. For every 100 females age 18 and over, there were 85.8 males.

The median income for a household in the township was $32,083, and the median income for a family was $36,563. Males had a median income of $28,333 versus $26,563 for females. The per capita income for the township was $15,818. About 12.4% of families and 17.2% of the population were below the poverty line, including 25.8% of those under age 18 and 9.8% of those age 65 or over.

== Communities and locations ==
- Elkland – A borough just south of the New York state line on Pennsylvania Route 49. It is located between Nelson and Osceola Township.
- Nelson – A village in the eastern part of the township, upstream from Cowanesque Lake. The village was relocated in the late 1970s as part of the Cowanesque Dam project of the U.S. Army Corps. of Engineers. The former village site is still accessible via the Tompkins Trail at the Corps. project, and a number of remnants of the village are still visible while hiking in this area (including the former main street). Most of these sites are in proximity to the Nelson Cemetery, which was the location of one of the two churches that formerly occupied the village (one of which was relocated to the new town site just west of the original location).
