= Terra Cotta (disambiguation) =

Terra Cotta (or terracotta) is a clay-based ceramic material, and objects made in it.

Terra Cotta or terracotta may also refer to:

== Places ==
- Terra Cotta, California, a small former mining town in the USA
- Terra Cotta, Illinois, an unincorporated community in the USA
- Terra Cotta, a community in Caledon, Ontario, Canada
- Terra Cotta, a 1990s heavy metal band from Cambridge, Ontario, Canada

== Other uses ==
- Terra cotta (color), a reddish-brown colour
- Terracotta, Inc., a software company

== See also ==
- Terracotta Army, ancient Chinese funerary warrior and horse statues
- Architectural terracotta
- Glazed architectural terra-cotta
- Terracotta roof tiles
