= Osceola Township, Pennsylvania =

Township in Pennsylvania, US

Coordinates: 41°59′00″N 77°20′59″W

- Township
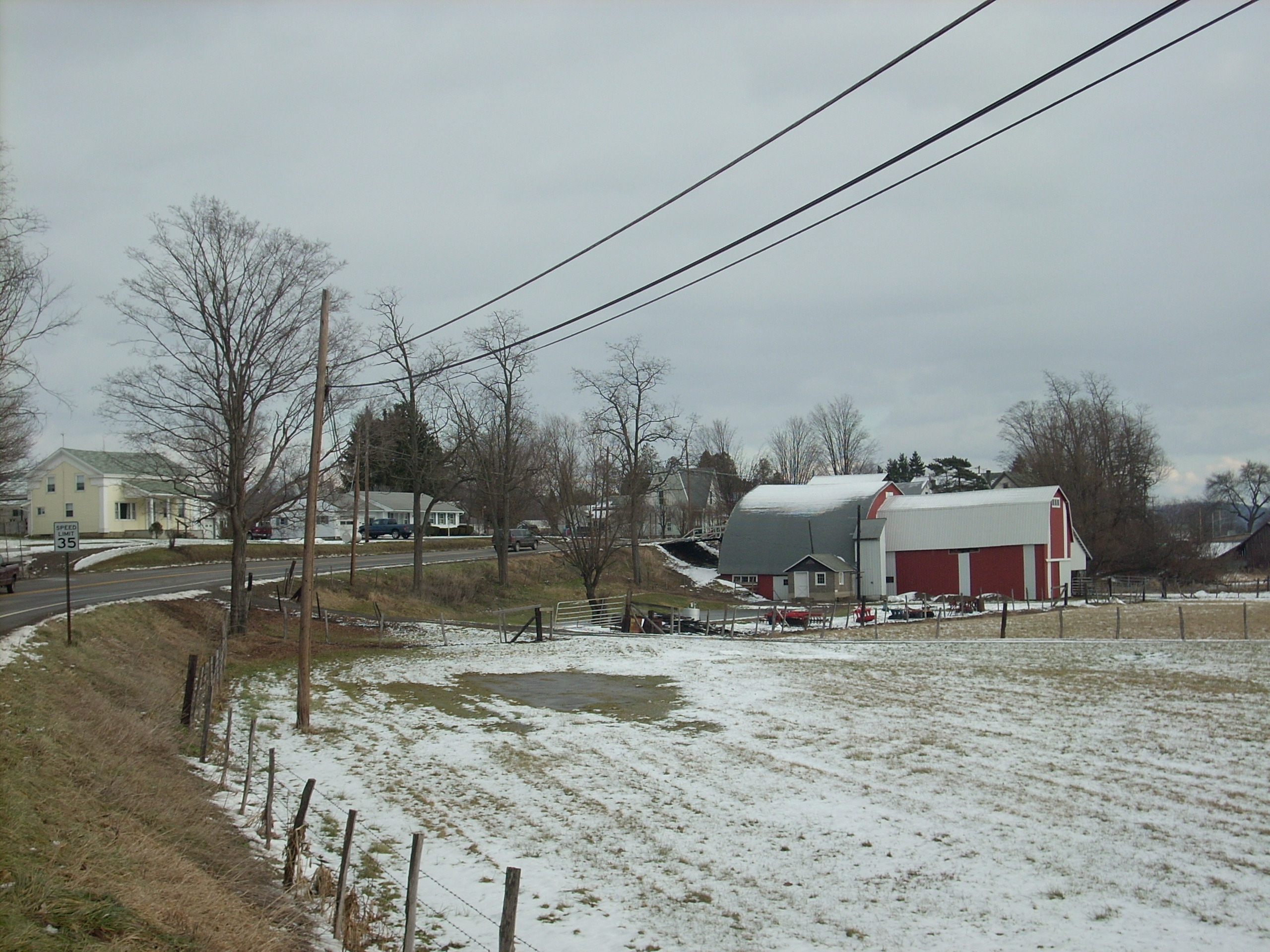
- Osceola Township as seen from Pennsylvania Route 49

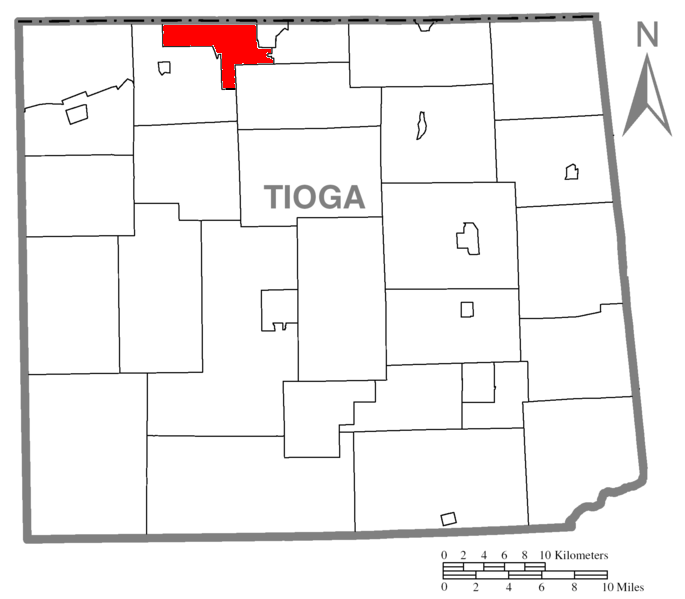
- Map of Tioga County Highlighting Osceola Township

- Map of Pennsylvania highlighting Tioga County
- Country: United States
- State: Pennsylvania
- County: Tioga
- Settled: 1795
- Incorporated: 1857

Area
  - Total: 13.58 sq mi (35.18 km^{2})
  - Land: 13.58 sq mi (35.18 km^{2})
  - Water: 0 sq mi (0.00 km^{2})

Population (2020)
  - Total: 587 ▼
  - Estimate (2023): 578
  - Density: 47.5/sq mi (18.33/km^{2})
- Time zone: Eastern Time Zone (North America)
  - Summer (DST): EDT
- ZIP code: 16942
- Area code: 814
- FIPS code: 42-117-57224
- Website: https://osceolatownship.com/

Historical population
Census	Pop.	Note	%±
2000	700		—
2010	659		−5.9%
2020	587		−10.9%
2023 (est.)	578		−1.5%
U.S. Decennial Census

Osceola Township is a township in Tioga County, Pennsylvania, United States. The population was 587 at the 2020 census.

== Geography ==
According to the United States Census Bureau, the township has a total area of 13.9 square miles (36.1 km^{2}), all land.

Oseola Township is bordered by Woodhull, Steuben County, New York to the north and Elkland and Nelson Township to the east. Farmington Township is on part of the eastern and southern border. Osceola Township is bordered by Deerfield Township to the south and west.

== Demographics ==
As of the census of 2000, there were 700 people, 268 households, and 192 families residing in the township. The population density was 50.2 inhabitants per square mile (19.4/km^{2}). There were 297 housing units at an average density of 21.3/sq mi (8.2/km^{2}). The racial makeup of the township was 97.86% White, 0.57% African American, 0.14% Asian, and 1.43% from two or more races. Hispanic or Latino of any race were 0.14% of the population.

There were 268 households, out of which 35.1% had children under the age of 18 living with them, 57.5% were married couples living together, 10.4% had a female householder with no husband present, and 28.0% were non-families. 22.4% of all households were made up of individuals, and 12.7% had someone living alone who was 65 years of age or older. The average household size was 2.61 and the average family size was 3.02.

In the township the population was diffused, with 27.6% under the age of 18, 7.9% from 18 to 24, 28.1% from 25 to 44, 23.0% from 45 to 64, and 13.4% who were 65 years of age or older. The median age was 36 years. For every 100 females, there were 91.8 males. For every 100 females age 18 and over, there were 91.3 males.

The median income for a household in the township was $33,482, and the median income for a family was $36,364. Males had a median income of $26,389 versus $22,083 for females. The per capita income for the township was $15,113. About 13.7% of families and 18.6% of the population were below the poverty line, including 22.9% of those under age 18 and 9.9% of those age 65 or over.

== Communities and locations in Osceola Township ==
- Elkland – A borough just south of the New York state line on Pennsylvania Route 49. It is located between Osceola and Nelson Township.
- Osceola – A village just west of Elkland on Pennsylvania Route 49.

== Notable person ==
- Louise Heims Beck, co-founder of the American Theatre Wing who was instrumental in the establishment of the Tony Awards
