= Aurelius Opilius =

Aurelius Opillus was a Roman physician who taught at Rome, first philosophy, then rhetoric, then grammar. He is placed next in order to Saevius Nicanor by Suetonius.

He gave up his school on the condemnation of Rutilius Rufus in 92 BC. He later accompanied Rufus to Smyrna, where they grew old together as friends.

== Works ==
Musæ in nine parts, which was also referred to by Aulus Gellius. Another work is named Pinax.
