= Avrely =

Russian masculien given name

Avrely (Russian: Авре́лий) is an old and rare Russian male first name. Its feminine version is Avreliya. The name is derived from Latin Aurelius (a Roman gens), itself derived from either the Latin word aurum (gold), or the combination of the Latin words aureus or aureoeus (golden) and the Greek word hēlios, meaning sun.

The name was included into various, often handwritten, church calendars throughout the 17th–19th centuries, but was omitted from the official Synodal Menologium at the end of the 19th century. In 1924–1930, the name was included into various Soviet calendars, which included the new and often artificially created names, although in this case the name was simply re-introduced.

Its diminutives include Avrelya (Авре́ля), Relya (Ре́ля), and Ava (А́ва).

The patronymics derived from "Avrely" are "Авре́лиевич" (Avreliyevich), "Авре́льевич" (Avrelyevich; both masculine); and "Авре́лиевна" (Avreliyevna), "Авре́льевна" (Avrelyevna; both feminine).

== See also ==
- Avrelian
