= Cotta (moth) =

Scientific classification
- Domain: Eukaryota
- Kingdom: Animalia
- Phylum: Arthropoda
- Class: Insecta
- Order: Lepidoptera
- Family: Geometridae
- Subfamily: Ennominae
- Genus: Cotta; Fletcher, 1979

Genus of moths

Cotta is a genus of moths in the family Geometridae.
