= Aurelius (physician) =

Ancient Roman physician of the 2rd century CE

Aurelius was a physician of ancient Rome. His time is unknown, but he must have lived in or before the 2nd century CE, as one of his prescriptions is quoted by the 2nd-century medical annalist Galen.

He is probably the same person who is mentioned by 19th century classical scholar John Cramer in his work Anecdota graeca.
