= Teco pottery =

American pottery company

The American Terra Cotta Tile and Ceramic Company, also known as the Gates Pottery, was established in Terra Cotta, Illinois, by William Day Gates in 1881. It marketed its products under the name Teco Pottery (/ˈtiːkoʊ/).

== Wares and history ==
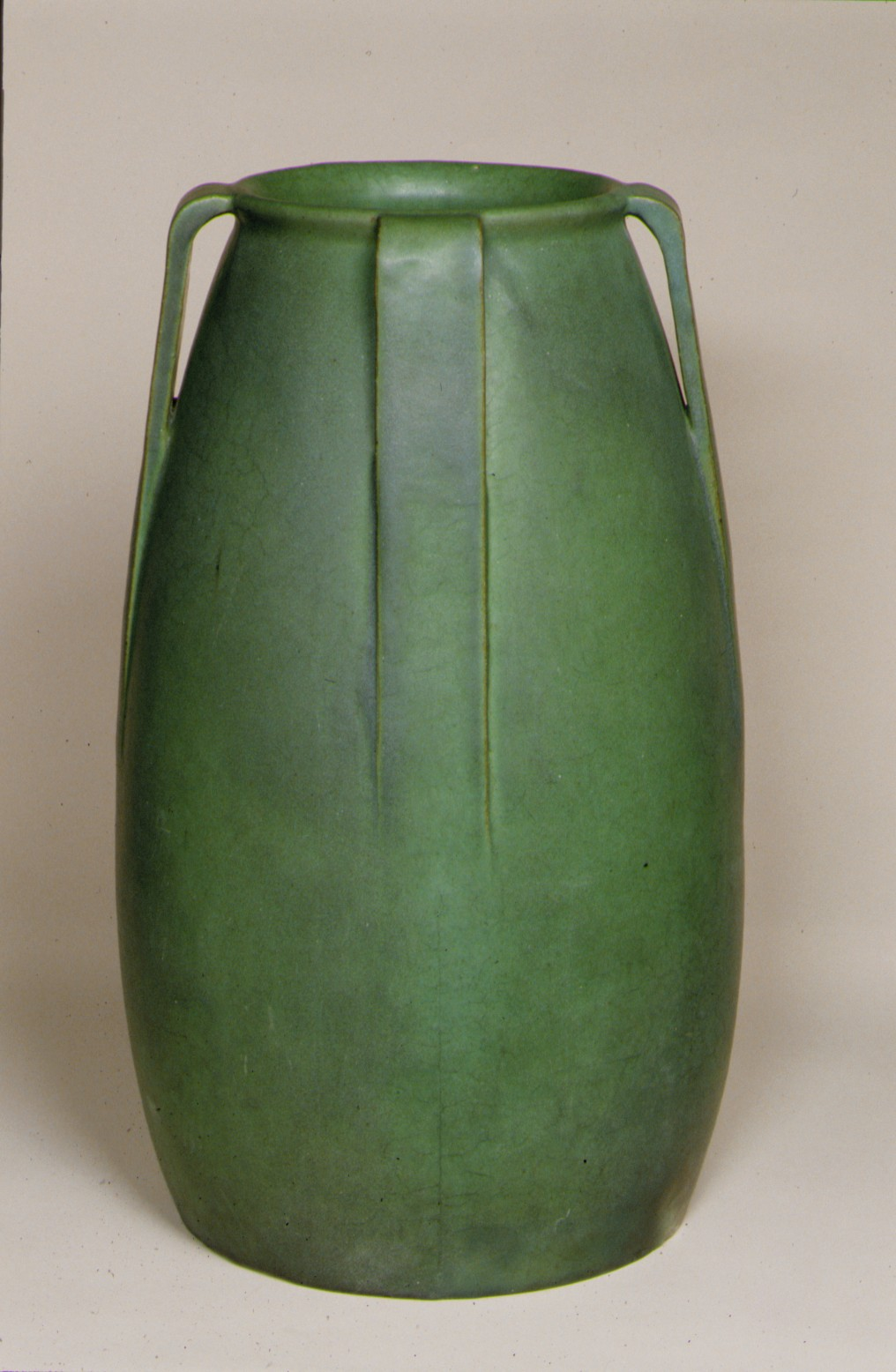
"Teco Green" vase, before 1922

The American Terracotta Tile and Ceramic Company was founded by William Day Gates in 1881—originally as Spring Valley Tile Works—in Terra Cotta, Illinois.

In 1889, the American Terracotta Tile and Ceramic Company became the country's first manufacturer of architectural terracotta. Their production consisted of drain tile, brick, chimney tops, finials, urns, and other economically fireproof building materials. Gates used the facilities to experiment with clays and glazes in an effort to design a line of art pottery. Gates was successful with his experimentation which led to the introduction of Teco Pottery.

Teco pottery shapes derived from line and color rather than elaborate decoration. The smooth, micro-crystalline, matte "Teco Green" glaze of Teco art pottery was developed independently and was not an attempt to copy the famous Grueby green. In addition to Teco Green, Teco pottery was manufactured in colors such as earthen brown, matte blue, and aventurine.

Most of the 500 shapes created by 1911 were the product of Gates' efforts, many of the remaining Teco designs were the work of several Chicago architects that were involved in the Prairie School style as expressed by Frank Lloyd Wright. They had rejected the revival styles of American architecture of the 19th century in favor of using wood, stone and clay in simplicity of design. Any ornamentation consisted of geometrical or natural objects which merged gracefully with the form. Teco Pottery became closely linked with this style and the pottery was often an integral part of Prairie School homes Bungalow.

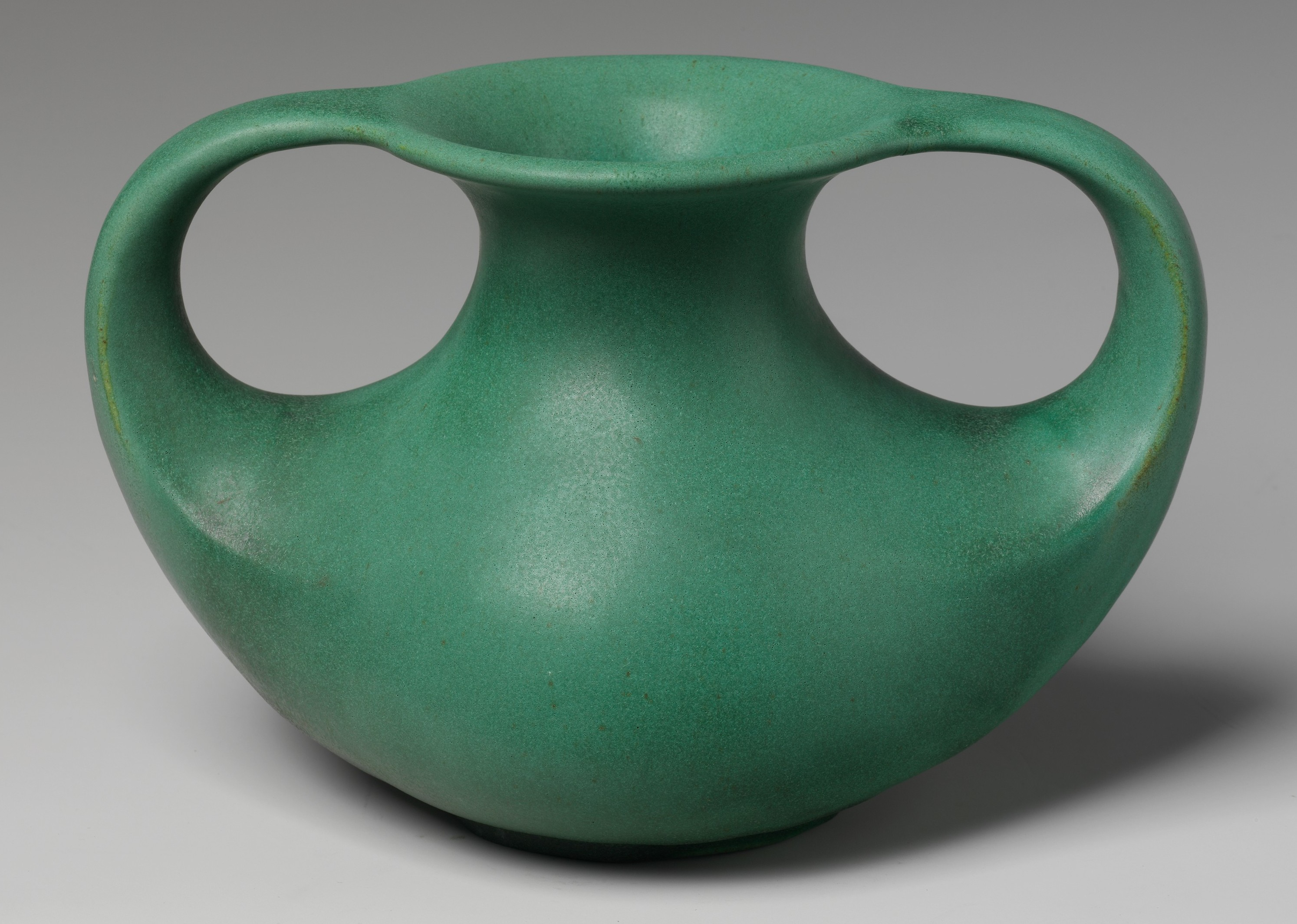
Matte Green Vase, Design No. 297

Gates retired in 1913 to write for Clay-worker magazine, but returned in 1915. His son Major Gates, a ceramic engineer, invented a pressing machine and tunnel kiln, and also a glaze spraying apparatus called a pulischrometer. In 1918, they acquired Indianapolis Terra Cotta Company. In 1919, a Minneapolis branch opened.

Nearing the end of his life, William D. Gates constructed a residence just north of Crystal Lake, Illinois named "Trail's End" symbolizing his decreasing involvement in the company.

== After the crash ==
In October 1929, the Indianapolis branch closed due to the stock market crash. Later, the plant also fell victim to the Great Depression and operations ceased. In 1930, ownership was transferred to George A. Berry, Jr; Gates' attorney. Terra cotta production resumed until 1941. After World War II, they resumed manufacturing structural clay products through 1966. In 1972, TC Inc. was formed from a merger of three businesses as production facility of ground engaging tools for construction equipment on the site.

== Impressed die-stamp ==
The following quote is from an early Teco Pottery catalog:

Teco Pottery Mark

"We prize most highly a piece of silver with the “Sterling” mark on it, because the mark tells us the quality of the silver. Makers of objects of art have long used a “hall-mark” as a pledge of quality. To protect the purchaser against substitution, the Gates Potteries stamp this mark on every piece of Teco Art Pottery, and none is genuine without it. Insist that the pieces you purchase have the TECO mark on them, as it is your guarantee of quality and genuineness. When you see the Teco mark on any piece of pottery you can rely upon its artistic merit and intrinsic worth. When you select a piece of Teco Art Pottery for a gift, you know it will be acceptable and prized by the recipient, because the mark TECO is a guarantee of genuine art value, and will be so recognized wherever it is seen."

== Archives ==
The American Terracotta Tile and Ceramic Company's / Teco Pottery records are housed at the University of Minnesota and include original architectural drawings.
