= Saevius Nicanor =

Roman grammarian

Saevius Nicanor (/ˈsiːviəs naɪˈkeɪnər/) is mentioned by Suetonius as the first grammarian who acquired fame and honour as a teacher among the Romans. He probably lived in the 3rd or 2nd century BC.

He was the author of commentaries, the greater portion of which was said to have been suppressed (intercepta dicitur), and of a satire where he declares himself to have been a freedman; and to have been distinguished by a double cognomen:

Sevius Nicanor Marci libertus negabit:
Sevius Nicanor Pothos idem ac Marcus docebit.

Saevius Nicanor, freedman of Marcus, will deny
he's the same person as Saevius Pothos, even if Marcus says so.

Suetonius adds that according to some accounts, because of a bad reputation he retired to Sardinia and there died.

Saevius Nicanor is invoked as a fictional authority in several of the works of James Branch Cabell, most notably Taboo: A Legend Retold from the Dirghic of Saevius Nicanor (1921).
