= Farmington Township, Tioga County, Pennsylvania =

Township in Pennsylvania, US

Coordinates: 41°55′00″N 77°14′29″W

- Township
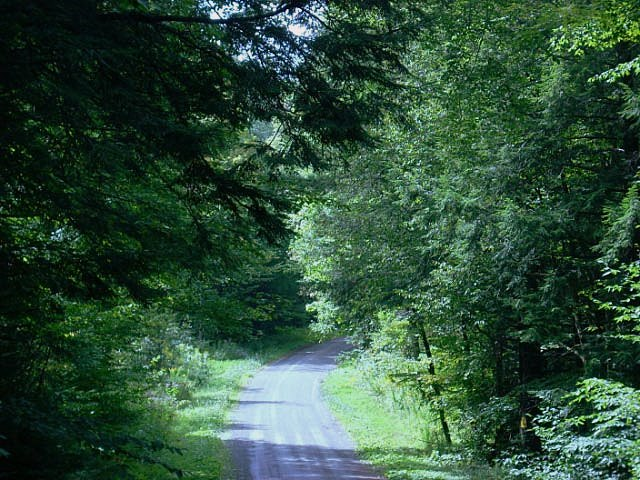
- McCollum Road in Farmington Township

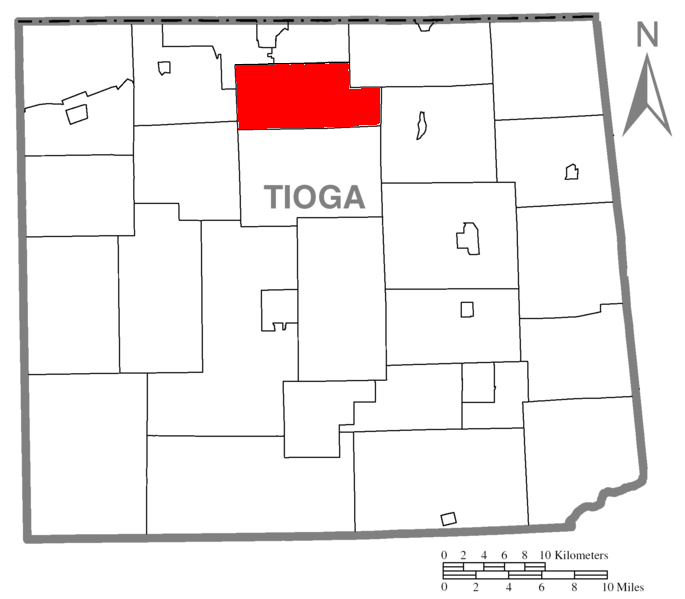
- Map of Tioga County Highlighting Farmington Township

- Map of Pennsylvania highlighting Tioga County
- Country: United States
- State: Pennsylvania
- County: Tioga
- Settled: 1820
- Incorporated: 1830

Area
  - Total: 31.65 sq mi (81.98 km^{2})
  - Land: 31.65 sq mi (81.98 km^{2})
  - Water: 0 sq mi (0.00 km^{2})

Population (2020)
  - Total: 664 ▲
  - Estimate (2023): 663
  - Density: 21.2/sq mi (8.17/km^{2})
- Time zone: Eastern Time Zone (North America)
  - Summer (DST): EDT
- FIPS code: 42-117-25296
- Website: https://farmingtontwp.com/

Historical population
Census	Pop.	Note	%±
2000	636		—
2010	637		0.2%
2020	664		4.2%
2023 (est.)	663		−0.2%
U.S. Decennial Census

Farmington Township is a township in Tioga County, Pennsylvania, United States. The population was 664 at the 2020 census.

== Geography ==
According to the United States Census Bureau, the township has a total area of 32.0 square miles (83 km^{2}), all land.

Farmington Township is bordered by Osceola Township to the west and north, Nelson Township to the north, Lawrence Township to the east and north, Tioga Township to the east, Middlebury Township to the south and Chatham and Deerfield Townships to the west.

== Demographics ==
As of the census of 2000, there were 636 people, 238 households, and 183 families residing in the township. The population density was 19.9 people per square mile (7.7 people/km^{2}). There were 305 housing units at an average density of 9.5 per square mile (3.7/km^{2}). The racial makeup of the township was 99.53% White, 0.16% from other races, and 0.31% from two or more races. Hispanic or Latino of any race were 0.31% of the population.

There were 238 households, out of which 29.4% had children under the age of 18 living with them, 64.7% were married couples living together, 6.3% had a female householder with no husband present, and 23.1% were non-families. 16.0% of all households were made up of individuals, and 7.6% had someone living alone who was 65 years of age or older. The average household size was 2.67 and the average family size was 2.96.

In the township the population was spread out, with 25.6% under the age of 18, 7.1% from 18 to 24, 26.4% from 25 to 44, 28.8% from 45 to 64, and 12.1% who were 65 years of age or older. The median age was 40 years. For every 100 females, there were 103.8 males. For every 100 females age 18 and over, there were 106.6 males.

The median income for a household in the township was $31,375, and the median income for a family was $34,219. Males had a median income of $26,818 versus $20,500 for females. The per capita income for the township was $13,874. About 15.6% of families and 19.9% of the population were below the poverty line, including 31.6% of those under age 18 and 14.1% of those age 65 or over.

== Communities and locations ==
- Elbridge – A village in the central part of the township.
- Farmington Center – A village in the western part of the township, also known as Karls Corners.
- Farmington Hill – A village in the east-central part of the township, about two miles east of Elbridge.
