= Terra Cotta, Illinois =

- Unincorporated community
- Location within Illinois Location within the United States
- Coordinates: 42°16′54″N 88°18′02″W
- Country: United States
- State: Illinois
- County: McHenry
- Elevation: 817 ft (249 m)
- Time zone: UTC-6 (Central (CST))
  - Summer (DST): UTC-5 (CDT)
- Area codes: 815 & 779
- GNIS feature ID: 423236

Terra Cotta is an unincorporated community in McHenry County, in the U.S. state of Illinois.

== History ==
A post office called Terra Cotta was established in 1886, and remained in operation until it was discontinued in 1927. The community was named after Teco pottery, a local terracotta pottery works.
