= Aurelia (mother of Caesar) =

Roman noblewoman, mother of Julius Caesar (d. 54 BCE)

- Born: December 28, 120 BC; Rome
- Died: July 31, 54 BC (aged about 66); Rome
- Spouse: Gaius Julius Caesar
- Children: Julia Major; Julia Minor; Julius Caesar
- Parents: Lucius Aurelius Cotta (father); Rutilia (mother)

Aurelia (c. 120 BC – 31 July 54 BC) was the mother of the Roman general and statesman Julius Caesar.

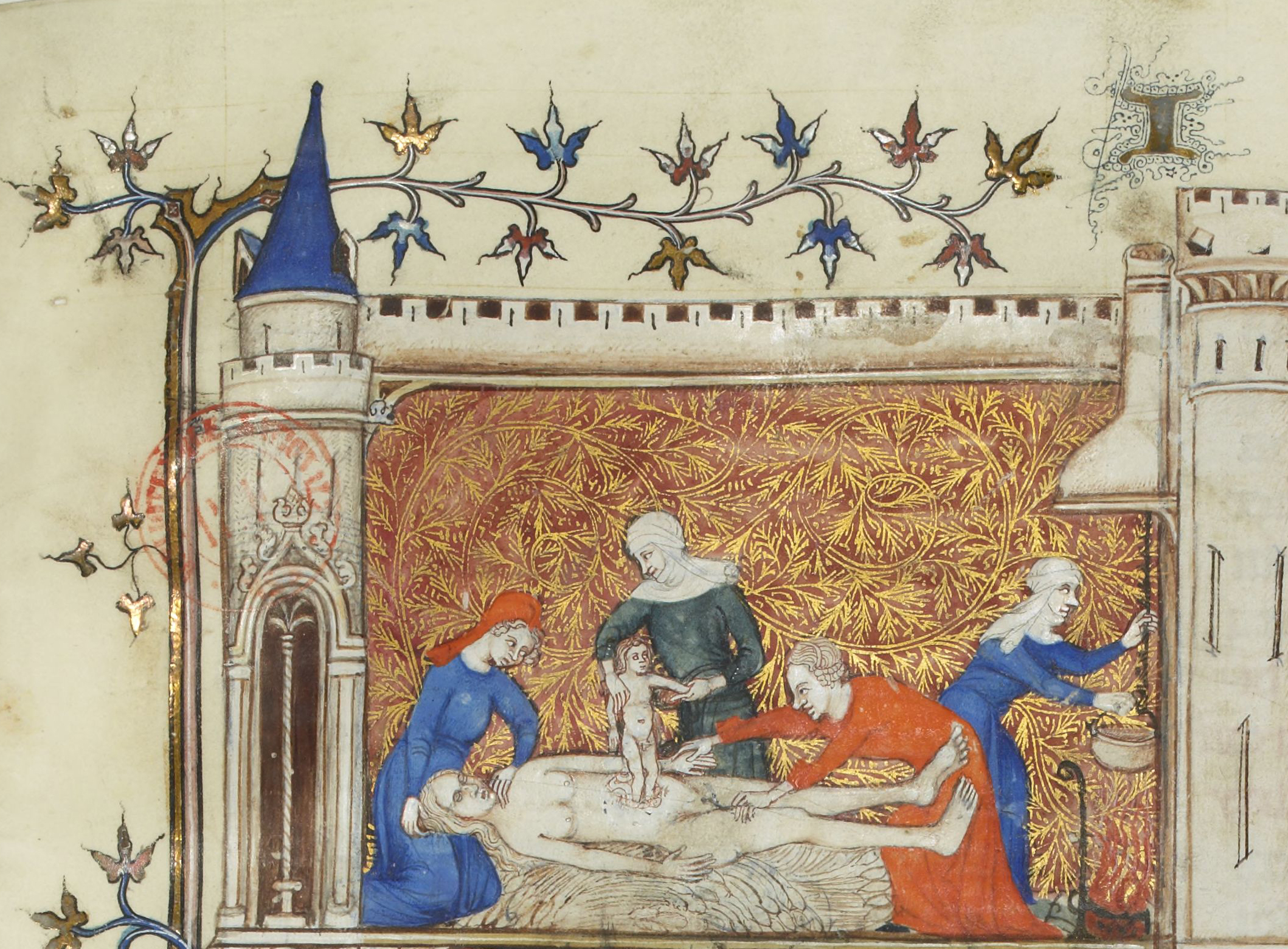
Birth of Caesar to Aurelia; illustration from the medieval Faits des Romains. This image perpetuates the myth that Caesar was born by Caesarean section, a procedure which was always fatal in the ancient world (or performed on pregnant women who were already dead), whereas Aurelia lived for decades after Caesar's birth. (The name "Caesar" is thought to mean "[war] elephant.")

== Family ==
Aurelia was a daughter of Rutilia and Lucius Aurelius Cotta or his brother, Marcus Aurelius Cotta. Her father was consul in 119 BC and her paternal grandfather of the same name was consul in 144 BC. The family of the Aurelii Cottae was prominent during the Roman Republican era. Her mother Rutilia, was a member of the gens Rutilia. They were of consular rank. Publius Rutilius Rufus was her maternal uncle.

Three of her brothers (or cousins) were consuls: Gaius Aurelius Cotta in 75 BC, Marcus Aurelius Cotta in 74 BC and Lucius Aurelius Cotta in 65 BC.

Aurelia married a praetor Gaius Julius Caesar. Her husband died 85–84 BC. Their children were:

- Julia Major (? – ? BC), grandmother of Lucius Pinarius and Quintus Pedius
- Julia Minor (? – 51 BC), wife of Marcus Atius Balbus and grandmother of emperor Augustus
- Gaius Julius Caesar (100 – 44 BC), the Dictator perpetuo

== Character ==
The historian Tacitus considered her an ideal Roman matron and thought highly of her, because she offered her children the best opportunities of education. Plutarch described her as a woman of discretion. Highly intelligent, independent and renowned for her beauty and common sense, Aurelia was held in high regard throughout Rome.

Aurelia and her family were very influential in her son's upbringing and security. Her husband, the elder Gaius Caesar, was often away, so the task of raising their son fell mostly on Aurelia's shoulders. When the younger Caesar was about 18, he was ordered by the then dictator of Rome, Lucius Cornelius Sulla, to divorce his young wife Cornelia Cinna, daughter of Lucius Cornelius Cinna who had supported Sulla's archenemy Marius. Young Caesar firmly refused, which put himself at great risk from Sulla. Aurelia became involved in the petition to save her son, defending him along with her brother Gaius Cotta.

After Cornelia's death in childbirth, Aurelia raised her young granddaughter Julia and managed her son's households. Caesar subsequently married Pompeia Sulla, granddaughter of Sulla. In 62 BC, during the Bona Dea festival held at Caesar's house, one of Aurelia's maids discovered that Publius Clodius had infiltrated the house while disguised as a woman, in order to start or continue an affair with her second daughter-in-law Pompeia. The two may have had certain improper relations before, but was subdued by Aurelia's close watch upon the women's residence. Clodius was later charged with the crime of sacrilege by Lucius Lentulus since his trespass caused the interruption of the sacrifice. Aurelia later appeared as a witness during the trial, along with her daughter Julia, testifying that she had ordered Clodius to leave. Caesar divorced Pompeia Sulla over this incident without any real proof she had committed adultery with Clodius. Caesar's reason for the divorce was that "Caesar's wife, like all Caesar's family, must be beyond suspicion".

== Legacy ==
The Roman tribe Aurelia was named in her honor.

== See also ==
- Women in Ancient Rome
- List of Roman women
