= Lex Aurelia iudiciaria =

Roman law on jury selection

The Lex Aurelia iudiciaria was a Roman law, introduced by the praetor Lucius Aurelius Cotta in 70 BC. The law defined the composition of the jury of the court investigating extortion, corruption and misconduct in office, the perpetual quaestio de repetundis. Previously exclusive to senators, the juries henceforth included equites and tribuni aerarii.

== Background ==
The quaestio de repetundis was the first permanent court established in Rome, set up in 149 BC to deal with embezzlement by Roman magistrates, most often, but not exclusively from their provincial subjects. Initially senators sat in judgement of their peers. A notable case heard by the court was that of Gaius Verres, prosecuted by Cicero. Verres was the last person judged under the system put in place by Sulla, where jury was chosen by lot from among the senators.

== Provisions ==
Under the terms of the legislation the jury for the quaestio was to have the following composition: one-third of it must be composed of senators, a third of equites, a third by tribuni aerarii. each category was to have 300 members, for a total or 900. The tribuni aerarii were citizens with a census equal to that of equites but not enrolled in the list.

The substantive law of the Sullan settlement remained, only the composition of the jury changed.

The lex Aurelia remained unchanged until the dictatorship of Caesar.

== See also ==
- List of Roman laws
- Roman Law
