= Lucius Aurelius Cotta (consul 119 BC) =

Roman Senator and military commander, Senator, consul 119 BCE

Consul of the Roman Republic
- In office 119 BC – 119 BC Serving with Lucius Caecilius Metellus Delmaticus

Personal details
- Children: Lucius Aurelius Cotta; Aurelia
- Parent: Lucius Aurelius Cotta (father)

Lucius Aurelius Cotta (fl. 2nd century BC) was a Roman Senator and military commander who was elected Roman consul in 119 BC. He was the maternal grandfather of Julius Caesar.

== Biography ==
Not much is known about the early career of Cotta, who was born into the Plebeian gens Aurelia. By 122 BC, he had been elected to the rank of Praetor, and this was followed by his election as consul in 119 BC.

During his tenure in office, he, along with his colleague Lucius Caecilius Metellus Dalmaticus, opposed the passage of a law proposed by Gaius Marius, then a Plebeian tribune, which was meant to reform the configuration of the voting booths, thereby reducing the influence of the so-called Optimates. He asked the Senate to order Marius to present himself before them; when they did so, Marius responded by threatening to have Cotta imprisoned. After Cotta's colleague Metellus was imprisoned on Marius’ orders, Cotta and the Senate backed down and allowed the passage of Marius’ law.

During his year in office, Cotta may have fought alongside Metellus in the campaign against the Dalmatians; the remaining sources are unclear if he actually participated or not.

== Family ==
His father of the same name was consul in 144 BC. He had at least two children: one son with the same name who then become the consul in 65 BC and one daughter, Aurelia Cotta, who later was married to Gaius Julius Caesar and bore him three children, two of which were the dictator Julius Caesar and Julia Minor, the first Roman emperor Augustus's maternal grandmother.

== Sources ==
- Broughton, T. Robert S., The Magistrates of the Roman Republic, Vol I (1951)
- Smith, William, Dictionary of Greek and Roman Biography and Mythology, Vol I (1867)

Political offices
Preceded by Publius Manilius and Gaius Papirius Carbo	Consul of the Roman Republic; 119 BC with Lucius Caecilius Metellus Dalmaticus	Succeeded by Marcus Porcius Cato and Quintus Marcius Rex
