= Avreliya =

Avreliya (Russian: Авре́лия) is a Russian non-canonical female first name. Its masculine version is Avrely.

In 1924–1930, the name was included into various Soviet calendars, which included new and often artificially created names.

Its diminutives include Avrelya (Авре́ля), Relya (Ре́ля), Yelya (Е́ля), and Ava (А́ва).
