= Avrelian =

Russian masculine given name

Avrelian (Russian: Аврелиа́н) is an old and uncommon Russian male first name. The name is derived from either Latin Aurelius (a Roman gens), itself derived from the Latin word aureolus, meaning golden, or from the adjective Aurelianus.

The name was included into various, often handwritten, church calendars throughout the 17th–19th centuries, but was omitted from the official Synodal Menologium at the end of the 19th century. From 1924 to 1930, the name was included into various Soviet calendars, which included the new and often artificially created names, although in this case the name was simply re-introduced.

Its diminutives include Avrelya (Авре́ля), Relya (Ре́ля), and Ava (А́ва).

The patronymics derived from "Avrelian" are "Аврелиа́нович" (Avrelianovich; masculine) and "Аврелиа́новна" (Avrelianovna; feminine).
