= Lucius Aurelius Cotta (consul 144 BC) =

Roman senator, consul 144 BCE

Lucius Aurelius Cotta was a Roman magistrate, tribune of the plebs in 154 BC, and consul in 144 BC.

== Biography ==
A member of the plebeian gens Aurelia, Cotta was elected tribune of the plebs in 154 BC. During his term as Plebeian tribune, Cotta refused to pay his debts during his term as magistrate, citing the 'sanctity' of his position. His colleagues declared that they would not support him unless he agreed to pay his creditors. Around 147 BC, Cotta was elected praetor.

In 144 BC, Cotta was made the consul of Rome together with Servius Sulpicius Galba where the two entered into a dispute before the Roman Senate about who would be the leader of the contemporary war against Viriathus on the Iberian Peninsula. Finally, Scipio Aemilianus proposed a decree stating that neither would lead the campaign, which would instead pass to one of the proconsuls of Hispania, Quintus Fabius Maximus Aemilianus (himself one of the consuls of 145 BC).

Afterwards, Cotta was accused by Scipio Aemilianus of acts of injustice. Although it appears that Cotta may have indeed been guilty, he was absolved of any wrongdoing as the judges wanted to avoid the semblance of his condemnation due to Scipio's great influence. He was defended by Quintus Caecilius Metellus Macedonicus (consul in 143 BC).

Cicero stated that Cotta was considered a veterator, saying that he was a capable man in both his business and personal life.

== Descendants ==
He had at least one son of the same name, who was also a consul in 119 BC. Through his son's daughter, Aurelia Cotta, he was the great-grandfather of the famous dictator Gaius Julius Caesar and (adoptive) great-great-grandfather of the first Roman Emperor Augustus.

== Sources ==
- Broughton, T. Robert S., The Magistrates of the Roman Republic, Vol I (1951)

Political offices
Preceded by Quintus Fabius Maximus Aemilianus; Lucius Hostilius Mancinus	Roman consul 144 BC; With: Servius Sulpicius Galba	Succeeded by Appius Claudius Pulcher; Q. Caecilius Metellus Macedonicus
