= Lucius Aurelius Cotta (consul 65 BC) =

Ancient Roman politician, consul 65 BCE

Lucius Aurelius Cotta was a Roman politician from an old noble family who held the offices of praetor (70 BC), consul (65 BC) and censor (64 BC). Both his father and grandfather of the same name had been consuls, and his two brothers, Gaius Aurelius Cotta and Marcus Aurelius Cotta, preceded him as consul in 75 and 74 BC respectively. His sister, Aurelia, was the mother of dictator, Julius Caesar.

While praetor in 70 BC, he brought in a law for the reform of the jury lists, by which the judices were to be selected, not from the senators exclusively as limited by Sulla, but from senators, equites and tribuni aerarii.

One-third were to be senators, and two-thirds men of equestrian census, one-half of whom must have been tribuni aerarii, a body as to whose functions there is no certain evidence, although in Cicero's time they were reckoned by courtesy amongst the equites. In 66 BC, Cotta and Lucius Manlius Torquatus accused the consuls-elect, Publius Cornelius Sulla and Publius Autronius Paetus, for the following year of bribery in connection with the elections; they were condemned and Cotta and Torquatus chosen in their places. The year after his consulship, in 64 BC, he was elected censor, but he and his colleague abdicated on account of the machinations of the tribunes.

After the suppression of the Catilinarian conspiracy, Cotta proposed a public thanksgiving for Cicero's services, and after the latter had gone into exile, supported the view that there was no need of a law for his recall, since the law of Clodius was legally worthless.

He subsequently attached himself to his nephew, Caesar, and it was reported that Cotta (who was then quindecimvir) intended to propose that Caesar should receive the title of king, it being written in the Sibylline Oracles that the Parthians could only be defeated by a king. Cotta's intention was not carried out in consequence of Caesar's assassination, after which he retired from public life.

== See also ==
- Ancient Roman politicians
- Political institutions of ancient Rome

Political offices
Preceded by Manius Aemilius Lepidus and Lucius Volcatius Tullus	Consul of the Roman Republic with Lucius Manlius Torquatus; 65 BC	Succeeded by Lucius Julius Caesar and Gaius Marcius Figulus
