= Iudicium populi =

Trial before the people in ancient Rome

A iudicium populi (literally "popular trial" or "popular judgement"; also called a iudicium publicum in earlier periods) was a judicial trial, primarily in the Roman Republic, before one of the popular assemblies. In the proceedings the popular assembly and the people that made it up heard evidence from the prosecuting magistrate and the defendant before rendering a final verdict directly. The presiding and prosecuting magistrate were most often aediles or plebeian tribunes but more rarely could also be one of the quaestors, the duumviri perduellionis, or in religious cases the pontifex maximus.

In the early republic these popular trials are believed to be the only means by which large fines or capital punishments could be administered at Rome, since the Twelve Tables and the laws permitting a citizen's appeal to the people and tribunes (provocatio and auxilium, respectively) made it illegal for a magistrate to otherwise punish a citizen. However, by the second century BC they competed for jurisdiction with the quaestiones perpetuae (permanent jury courts) which heard cases on specific types of cases (such as corruption, public violence, and murder) in a more streamlined manner. The emperors' arrogation of provocatio and assertion of exclusive jurisdiction over the criminal law by the early empire made the iudicia populi obsolete.

== History ==
=== Origins ===
It was believed in the late republic that the iudicia populi were the means by which all crimes were tried if the penalty attached were severe fine, scourging, or death. This was believed to have been in response to the legal right of provocatio ad populum, putatively established at the same time of the republic itself, which gave a citizen the right to appeal to the people against any magistrate's summary jurisdiction. This story's accuracy has been questioned, with scholars suggesting that the tie to provocatio is fictitious. In one variant of this view, only trials in the first instance occurred: the assembly's putative appellate function was then an antiquarian fiction. Alternatively, the iudicia populi in the early republic may have applied only to political crimes prosecuted by tribunes, with all other crimes handled on a summary basis by the praetors and tresviri capitales.

Whether or not anachronistic, the power of the popular assemblies to try cases had emerged by the early republic. The centuriate assembly was instituted during the regal period and there are indications that appeals were sent up by the king to the centuries for disposition. The creation of the republic at the end of the 6th century (c. 500 BC) may have confirmed the centuriate assembly's pre-existing right to hear capital appeals or expanded its powers by making it the sole body in the state with such power. Whether or not so early, the emergence of provocatio laws by 300 BC allowing any citizen appeal to the people against any capital sentence presupposed the existence of the iudicium populi with an appellate function.

=== Decline ===
Popular trials were suitable for city states with relatively small populations. However, by the second century BC Roman territories spanned the whole of the Italian peninsula. Moreover, the centuriate assembly's judicial capacity was by this point obsolescent since the centuriae were called almost only for elections. The second century also saw the development of ad hoc senatorial tribunals, in modern scholarship called quaestiones extra ordinem, which were assigned to but outside the normal jurisdiction of urban magistrates. These courts were normally established in response to abnormal affairs such as a rash of poisonings or insurrection.

In 149 BC the lex Calpurnia created the first permanent jury court, called a quaestio perpetua, with a jurisdiction over corruption. This kind of court was established on the model of the ad hoc senatorial tribunals, except that they would permanently stand to hear cases on a prospective basis. These courts were likely created to obviate the need to call a formal and cumbersome assembly to hear a trial on small matters. Another reason was to obviate the need for a magistrate to initiate proceedings: instead, the permanent courts were modelled on private actions and, rather than limiting prosecution to magistrates, anyone harmed had the right to initiate action. Reforms during Gaius Gracchus' tribunates in the late 120s BC accelerated the transfer of judicial activities from the assemblies to these newer jury courts, though hard-fought disputes emerged in the years following over the composition of those juries. The Sullan reforms created a whole set of permanent quaestiones that had jurisdiction over most of the common charges prosecutors could bring against public officials, making resort to a popular trial largely unnecessary.

The emergence of the quaestiones and their expansion under Sulla did not, however, immediately end popular trials. This mode of prosecution, if abolished by Sulla, was definitely again available after the restoration of tribunician powers in 70 BC. Cicero, for example, threatened popular prosecution as aedile against Verres and Caesar engaged in an actual prosecution as duumvir perduellionis in 63 BC. However, there was a substantial reduction in their use due to the new Sullan courts' collectively broad jurisdiction, the delays and logistical cumbersomeness of the popular trial, and the consolidation of judicial process into the quaestiones during the 70s when plebeian tribunes were prohibited from prosecuting before the assemblies.

The early principate saw the traditional public judicial system little changed. Consuls started to intervene more often in judicial matters with the Senate as the jury for trials of defendant senators. However, the emperor's tribunicia potestas created the norm that all decisions could be appealed to his hands or those of his delegates. Criminal jurisdiction in Italy by the end of the second century AD was essentially entirely usurped by imperial officials, namely the urban prefect for cases close to Rome and for more distant ones the praetorian prefects.

== Procedure ==
There are multiple models for how the iudicium populi functioned. The two main reconstructions are those of the scholars Theodor Mommsen and Wolfgang Kunkel. One of the main points of dispute between the two models is the scope of the iudicium populi's customary jurisdiction: did the comitia try all capital crimes or only major ones of a political nature?

In Mommsen's view, the public law functioned for all offences on a summary basis before a magistrate. The magistrate's decision then stood unless the defendant appealed to the people with provocatio. After the appeal, an appellate trial then started in an assembly (the comitia centuriata if capital) where the people could annul or affirm the magistrate's initial sentence. Kunkel's view instead places the assembly at the centre, where, instead of hearing an appeal, it served as a trial court directly by hearing evidence and making a decision. In this reconstruction, the magistrate serves only as prosecutor. Moreover, magistrates were not required to prosecute all cases before the comitia but rather passed judgement in a consilium (a hearing where the magistrate deliberated with advisors) against which appeal could only be effected through the plebeian tribunes's power of auxilium.

The traditional view from Mommsen has some difficulties: most notably, for crime at Rome to be adequately prosecuted with that interpretation of provocatio, the comitia would have to meet almost continuously. Kunkel's view instead would have the comitia called only for major political crimes where it would be difficult for a magistrate to easily act against a powerful person; here, the comitia would be called only intermittently, which better accords with the evidence. Under this view, provocatio was a right enforced only at the initiative of a plebeian tribune by auxilium or after the fact by prosecuting a magistrate who violated it, something which tribunes were disinclined to do for most criminals.

=== Initiation ===
Trials where the defendant's life or citizenship were in question could only occur before the greatest or most-important assembly (Latin: maximo comitatu). The Romans viewed this to refer to the centuriate assembly, though some scholars such as Emilio Gabba believe that the phrase "greatest assembly" may initially have merely meant that an assembly with good attendance.

Actions were started by a magistrate, almost always a junior one: the only ones recorded to have done so were quaestors, plebeian tribunes, aediles, the pontifex maximus (only on cases relating to neglect of religious office), and the duumviri perduellionis (only for perduellio, or treason, cases). The most common prosecutor was one of the ten annual plebeian tribunes. But since none of those magistrates had the right to summon a centuriate assembly, if such an assembly was required he would call upon the urban praetor or a consul to do so on his behalf. Whatever the assembly or charges, the prosecuting magistrate declared a specific day – referred to with the technical words diem dicere ("to declare the day") – on which the trial would commence before a specific form of assembly on fixed charges against a certain defendant. The prosecutor also announced the penalty sought, which could range from a fine to death. Penalties were not generally fixed by law but were flexible and at the discretion of the magistrates, and by need for ratification, the people.

Charges could brought on essentially any matter relating to the violation of law. Common charges included violation of augural law, waging illegal warfare resulting in defeat, cowardice by a commander, surrender of an army, theft of war booty (Latin: peculatus), violation of an allied community's rights, violation of tribunician sacrosanctity, or abuse of office. Other charges included the use of magic and stuprum (sodomy or adultery). However, magistrates could also prosecute for violation of morals: cowardice during battle, abuse of tribunician veto, or outrageous speech. Murder, theft, and assault were in republican Rome largely private matters; similarly, matters within a household (inclusive of the slaves thereof) were also private matters under the jurisdiction of the relevant pater familias. These matters were not generally brought before the assemblies.

For upper class defendants, bail was not normally required nor the defendant normally arrested. Instead, he was summoned by herald to the assembly. It was possible to ignore those summons by pleading illness or other excuses but in absence a magistrate could move for a sentence of exile and forfeiture of property to be passed without trial. Lower class defendants, if they were even subject to this form of trial rather dealt with by a magistrate's summary process, could instead be held before trial or sentencing.

=== Argument, verdict, and provocatio ===
The argument occurred over at least three different contiones (meetings of the people), where the presiding magistrate prosecuted and investigated the case in public before the people. Each meeting was separated by at least one day. However, the three preliminary meetings could be waived at mutual assent or, if none of the tribunes objected on the defendant's behalf, by non-enforcement. The prosecuting magistrate could give speeches or hear witness testimony under oath; and, although the prosecuting magistrate had the right to exclude unwanted speakers from his assembly, he customarily permitted the defence substantial time to present material or call witnesses. After a trinundinum had elapsed from the final speech, a fourth meeting occurred.

There are multiple reconstructions as to how provocatio (an appeal to the people) could be made in a trial. The traditional reconstruction from Mommsen is based largely on Ciceronean descriptions in De Legibus and has the prosecuting magistrate pronounce a sentence which is then immediately appealed against by the defendant to the assembled people for a vote. Alternatively, the vote itself could be the decision which, since it came from the people, could not be stayed or overturned by provocatio ad populum. In a third possibility, provocatio could have had nothing to do with trials at all, being merely a form of appeal against a magistrate's summary jurisdiction (coercitio). In this reconstruction, a trial involved provocatio merely tangentially and only if the trial itself emerged from a tribune's referral of an appeal heard against a magistrate.

The nature of provocatio aside, a popular vote necessarily occurred. Storms or other ill omens observed during the vote could be taken as signs of divine acquittal. Votes prior to the lex Cassia in 137 BC were public; between 137 and the lex Coelia of 106 they were secret in non-capital trials; after 106 they were all secret.

In capital cases, defendants were generally permitted to flee the city into exile in the moments before a majority for conviction emerged from the centuriae. After such flight, a plebiscite was then normally moved to formally exile the defendant. However, in less serious cases with fines, no such flight was possible and a prosecutor could imprison convicts who were unable to pay or make sureties for fines levied.

=== Veto ===
At any time during the trial the prosecutor could withdraw charges. Plebeian tribunes could also interpose their vetos to prevent decisions which they viewed to be unjust. Such vetos would be applied at the start of a trial, during a specific part, or even against the sentence to be imposed. Tiberius Sempronius Gracchus, for example, vetoed the sentence issued against Scipio Asiagenes on the grounds that Scipios' achievements in the Antiochene War. However, the veto was exercised mainly against procedural faults such as repeated prosecution of a defendant, prosecution of a magistrate in office, or prosecution of a magistrate on campaign without his consent.

== List of iudicia populi ==
=== Before 149 BC ===
All years BC.

Year	Prosecutor	Defendant	Charge	Outcome	Source
248	Gaius Fundanius Fundulus and Pullius	Publius Claudius Pulcher	Perduellio (treason)	Dropped after ill omen (storm) triggered tribunician veto	
248	Gaius Fundanius Fundulus and Pullius	Publius Claudius Pulcher	Perduellio (treason)	Fined 120,000 asses	
246	Gaius Fundanius Fundulus and Tiberius Sempronius Gracchus (plebeian aediles)	Claudia	Arrogant speech	Fined 25,000 asses	
226	Marcus Claudius Marcellus (curule aedile)	Gaius Scantinius Capitolinus	Stuprum (sodomy)		
212	Lucius Carvilius and Spurius Carvilius (tribunes)	Marcus Postumius	Fraud	Disrupted by mob	
212	Lucius Carvilius and Spurius Carvilius (tribunes)	Marcus Postumius	Perduellio (violation of tribunician sacrosanctity)	Convicted	
211	Gaius Sempronius Blaesus (tribune)	Gnaeus Fulvius Flaccus	Perduellio (cowardice in battle)	Convicted	
192	Publius Junius Brutus and Marcus Tuccius (tribunes)	Various moneylenders	Usury	Convicted	
191	Spurius Postumius Albinus (curule aedile)	Gaius Furius Chresimus	Agricultural sorcery		
189	Publius Sempronius Gracchus and Gaius Sempronius Rutilus (tribunes)	Manius Acilius Glabrio	Theft of war booty during consulship in 191		
169	Publius Rutilius (tribune)	Gaius Claudius Pulcher	Perduellio (violation of tribunician sacrosanctity)	Acquitted	

=== After 149 BC ===
All years BC.

Year	Prosecutor	Defendant	Charge	Outcome	Source
145		Gaius Plautius	Perduellio (military failure in Hispania Ulterior)	Convicted, exiled	
140	Tiberius Claudius Asellus (tribune)	Publius Cornelius Scipio Aemilianus	Failure to perform censorial lustrum properly	Acquitted	
140		Marcius Aemilius Lepidus Porcina	Military failure in Spain	Convicted, fine	
131		Lucius Valerius Flaccus	Appeal against fine by the pontifex maximus	Fine remitted	
120	Publius Decius Subulo (tribune)	Lucius Opimius	Killing of Gaius Gracchus etc without trial	Acquitted	
111	Gaius Memmius (tribune)		Perduellio	Trial vetoed by tribune	
c. 107	Gaius Coelius Caldus (tribune)	Gaius Popillius Laenas	Perduellio (surrender to the Tigurini to save army)	Convicted, exiled	
104	Gnaeus Pompeius Strabo (tribune)	Quintus Fabius Maximus Eburnus	Killing of son suspected of parricide	Convicted, exiled	
104	Gnaeus Domitius Ahenobarbus	Marcus Junius Silanus	Illegal warfare against the Cimbri	Acquitted	
103		Gnaeus Mallius Maximus	Defeat at Battle of Arausio	Convicted, exiled	
103	Gnaeus Domitius Ahenobarbus (tribune)	Marcus Aemilius Scaurus (consul 115 BC)	Failure to correctly perform religious duties	Acquitted	
101		Publicius Malleolus	Matricide	Convicted, executed	
101	Lucius Appuleius Saturninus (tribune)	Quintus Caecilius Metellus Numidicus	Perduellio or violation of lex Appuleius de maiestate	Convicted, exiled	
99	Gaius Appuleius Decianus (tribune)	Lucius Valerius Flaccus		Acquitted	
99 or 98	Gaius Appuleius Decianus and Gaius Canuleius (tribunes)	Publius Furius	Abuse of tribunician veto to prevent recall of Metellus Numidicus	Defendant killed by mob before verdict	
88?	Quintus Caecilius Metellus Celer (aedile)	Gnaeus Sergius Silus	Stuprum (attempted to bribe a married woman to adultery)	Convicted, fine	
87	Marcus Vergilius (tribune)	Lucius Cornelius Sulla	Extrajudicial killing of Sulpicius		
87	Unknown tribune	Appius Claudius Pulcher		Convicted, exiled	
87	Marcus Marius Gratidianus (tribune)	Quintus Lutatius Catulus	Perduellio	Defendant suicide	
86	Publius Popillius Laenas (tribune)	Sextus Lucilius and two other former tribunes		Convicted, Lucilius executed at Tarpeian Rock with others exiled	
86	Gaius Flavius Fimbria (possibly quaestor)	Quintus Mucius Scaevola		Dropped	
74	Lucius Quinctius (tribune)	Gaius Junius	Failure to follow judicial procedure while aedile in 75	Convicted	
73	Gaius Licinius Macer (tribune)	Gaius Rabirius	Violating sacred ground	Acquitted	
66	Gaius Memmius (tribune)	Marcus Terentius Varro Lucullus	Misconduct while quaestor or legate	Acquitted	
63	Gaius Julius Caesar and Lucius Julius Caesar (duumviri perduellionis)	Gaius Rabirius	Perduellio (killing of Saturninus in 100)	Convicted, provocatio made to people, trial stopped	
58	Lucius Antistius (tribune)	Gaius Julius Caesar	Illegal actions while consul in 59	Dropped	
56	Publius Clodius Pulcher (tribune)	Titus Annius Milo	Public violence (de vi)	Dropped	
