= Lex Valeria =

There were several laws in ancient Rome that were called by the name Lex Valeria:

- Lex Valeria (82 BC), which made Sulla dictator
- Valerian and Porcian laws, regarding the right of appeal
