= Laterculus (disambiguation) =

Laterculus may refer to:

- Laterculus, a Latin list or table, in particular:
  - Laterculus Veronensis or Verona List, a list of Roman provinces
- Helicina laterculus, a species of snail; see Helicina
