= Centuriate assembly =

Popular assembly in the Roman Republic which elected censors, consuls, and praetors

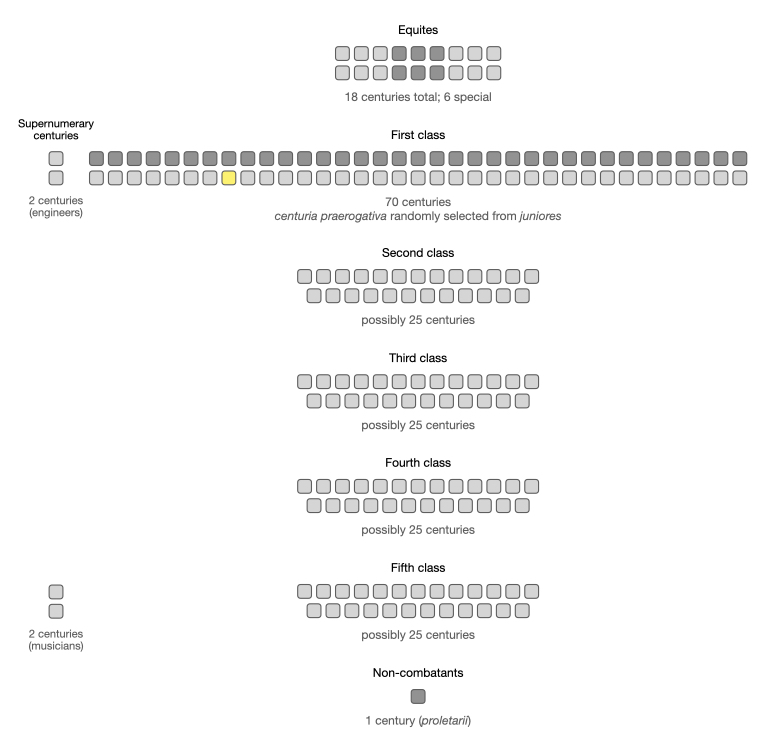
After reforms in the third century BC, the first class of centuries fell from 80 centuries to 70 centuries and the centuria praerogativa was added to guide elections.

The centuriate assembly (Latin: comitia centuriata) was a popular assembly of ancient Rome. In the Roman Republic, its main function was electing the consuls, praetors, and censors. It was made up of 193 centuries (Latin: centuriae) which were apportioned to Roman citizens by wealth and age, hugely overweighting the old and wealthy.

The assembly, according to the ancient sources, dates to the regal period and initially closely resembled the Roman army of the period in form, with the equestrians serving as cavalry, the upper census classes serving as heavy infantry, and the lower classes serving as light infantry. Whether this was ever the case is unclear; regardless, by the third century BC the assembly did not closely resemble the Roman people under arms and it served a largely electoral purpose, as it was rarely called to vote on legislation or to decide – as was its theoretical legal right as place of final appeal – capital cases.

Assembly procedure was weighted towards the upper classes. Both before and after reforms some time between 241 and 216 BC, the first class and equestrians voted first. Their votes would be tallied and announced. Then the classes would vote in descending order of wealth. Once the requisite number of candidates received a majority of voting units, voting would end. Because the equestrians, first class, and second class made a clear majority of voting units, the lower census classes would never be called on if they were in agreement. There is scholarly disagreement as to the extent to which the comitia centuriata facilitated competitive elections, even within its de facto restrictive electorate. The traditional view is that Roman elections were largely unrepresentative of the population as a whole and dominated by the wealthy through social connections.

While the assembly continued to exist during the Roman Empire, it served largely to rubber stamp decisions made by the emperor or senate. It is last recorded in the third century AD.

== Origins ==
According to Roman tradition, the monarch Servius Tullius created the comitia centuriata as an assembly dividing the people by wealth into different blocks called centuriae (sing. centuria) for service in Rome's military. This was possibly for the goal of splitting the levy across regional and clan loyalties to reduce the power of the patricians against the king. Within each class, the even number of centuries was then divided into two, with one for the seniores and one for the juniores. This was reportedly also a division in the duties of these centuries, with the seniores (aged 46–60) defending the city and the juniores (aged 17–45) serving on the front lines. Demography suggests that a century of juniores would have outnumbered one of seniores about three-to-one.

The highest class were the equites with the public horse (Latin: equites equo publico), who served as cavalry and received a horse subsidy from the state. The other classes were expected to outfit themselves with military equipment at their own expense. These classes were ordered by wealth, with the first class being the richest. They were expected to have the best equipment, with its quality falling along with the classes' property requirements. The specific description of equipment in Livy and Dionysius, however, are likely conjectures from the annalists who were presented with bare property qualification figures. The top three classes were likely Rome's original hoplite infantry; the fourth and fifth classes were lightly armed troops; and the proletarii were exempt from military service. These divisions were based on the assessed value of the wealth of a family in the census.

One conjecture initially given by Plinio Fraccaro is that the original Servian organisation did not contain the centuries of seniores. Such an assembly would have had, in the top three classes, the same number of centuries as that in a Roman legion. In this telling, only later, when the assembly took on a political character, were the seniores added and given equal representation to the existing actual centuries. The term infra classem ("below the class") applied then to those who were below the class to serve in the heavy infantry. It is also possible that this division between classis and infra classem also marked an end to the comitia centuriata's military role, instead taking on the timocratic and gerontocratic character of the later comitia where the old and rich controlled the state.

The establishment of the republic, in traditional narrative, would have transformed the comitia into a vehicle for electing consuls with expanded judicial powers, deferred to by the mere fact that it was the army. However, many parts of this narrative are unclear: it is not clear that there even was a centralised state which elected magistrates in this early period; nor is it certain that Rome was governed by consuls to be elected in such an assembly. For Fred Drogula, in the 2015 book Commanders and Command, the decisive break is in 367 BC, when he believes that the Romans centralised their political system around three magistrates that would over time would become the dual consuls and the sole praetor. However, it is also not too far-fetched to believe that an assembly like the comitia centuriata, similar to hoplite democracies depicted in ancient Greece during the same period, would have existed.

Replacing the centuries as the basis for the Roman levy were the tribes, which received their own assembly. Tim Cornell in the 1995 book Beginnings of Rome, suggests that the 406 BC introduction of wages for soldiers was the transition point, since it necessitated the raising of tax revenue which he suggests was apportioned flatly to each century, therefore correlating political privilege with tax paid.

== Duties ==
By the late republic, almost all business before the centuries was that of elections for the magistracies which would be the centuries' nominal commanders (consuls and praetors) or otherwise to conduct the census which would eventually allot citizens to their centuries (censors). It did, however, also have power to legislate, as in it did in 57 BC when it repealed the laws forcing the consul Cicero to go into exile.

The citizens had the right to appeal to the assembly against arbitrary magisterial action. Because legislation by 300 BC made execution of a Roman citizen who had asked for appeal illegal, mere appeal – provocatio – was all that was necessary to trigger this right. Actually calling the assembly to decide on trials was rare, and the expansion of the permanent jury courts by Sulla in the 80s BC caused trials in the assemblies to fall into obsolescence. Whether capital trials were required to be held in the comitia centuriata is debated: Mommsen believed so, following Cicero's interpretation of the Latin maximus comitiatus ("very great assembly"); however others have argued instead that this was merely a requirement that turnout be large.

In matters of foreign policy, the centuries also were responsible for formal declarations of war. The most famous example is that of 200 BC at the start of the Second Macedonian War, where the centuries unexpectedly rejected war with Macedon. The vote was repeated after haranguing by the senate and promises not to draft veterans of the Second Punic War, whereupon it passed. However, evidence for this dispository power over war in the late republic is scant. The senate may have assumed such responsibilities, though this may relate to sources simply not mentioning centuriate declarations of war.

The comitia centuriata also had collateral responsibilities related to public religion with the ordination of flamines to Mars, the god of war. Beyond the actual election of censors, the centuriate assembly confirmed their election with a lex centuriata.

== Procedure ==
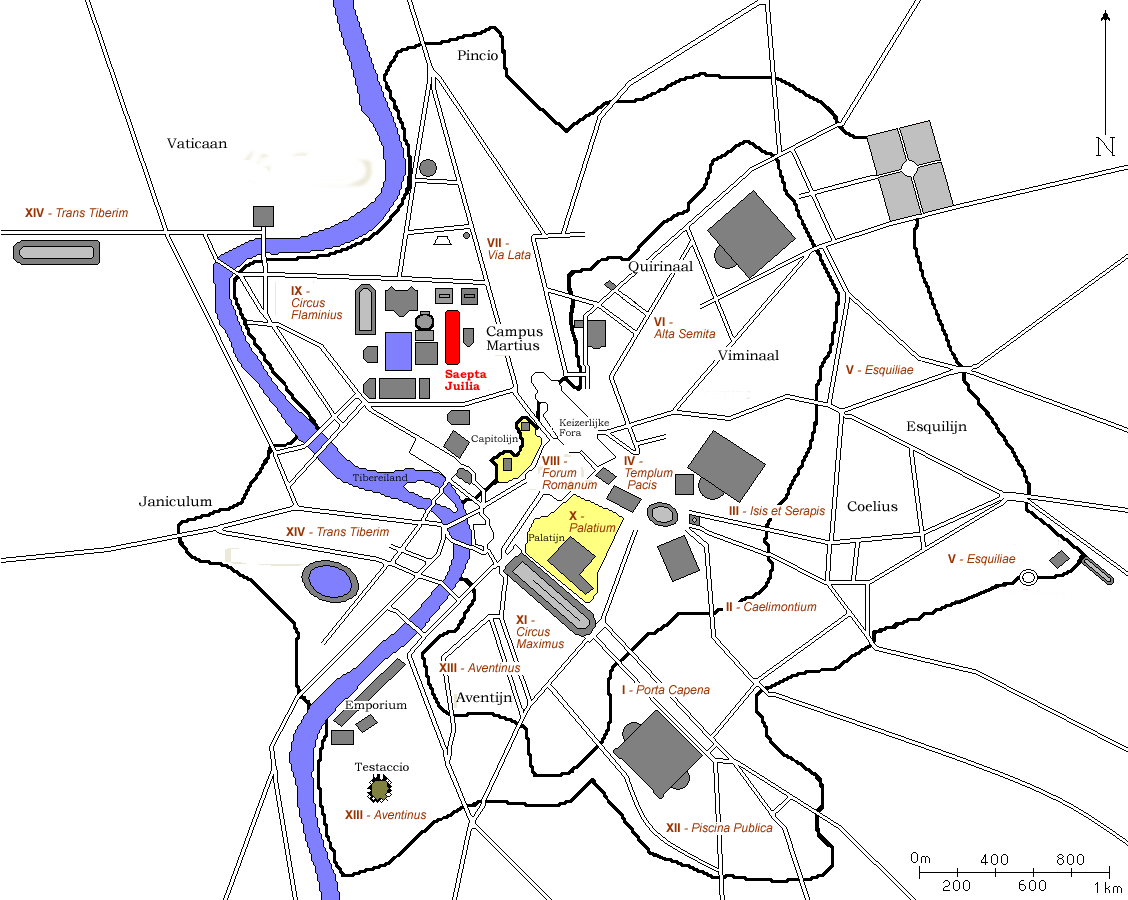
The saepta Julia, in red, was the meeting place of the comitia centuriata built by Augustus, replacing the temporary wooden structure on the same site during the republic. It would have held between 30 and 70 thousand people.

As with other assemblies, the centuries could only be summoned by a magistrate: they had no right of initiative. For elections, a magistrate – here a consul, dictator, or interrex – would post an edict announcing a day on which elections would be held. Under the lex Caecilia Didia of 98 BC, a trinundium – three market days; a period of more than seventeen days by modern reckoning – then elapsed.

All meetings of the centuriate assembly took place on the campus Martius, outside the pomerium, the ritual boundary of the city, since the centuriate assembly was theoretically an army and such a military force was illegal within the city's boundaries. Meetings took place in the saepta, also called the ovile, which was named for the subdivisions for centuries that looked like rectangular pens. During the republic, the saepta was a temporary wooden structure; it was eventually turned into the saepta Julia – an elections complex with a plaza measuring some 310 by 120 metres (1,020 by 390 ft) – during the reign of Augustus. Such a space would have held at most some 70,000 voters with estimates ranging down to 30,000.

By tradition, a red flag would be raised on the Janiculum to warn of possible enemy attack during meetings. On the day of the election, the presiding magistrate would within an inaugurated area (Latin: templum) take auspices. If the auspices were favourable, he would then call the people to assemble and conduct a prayer. The assembly would then deliver their votes by crossing into the templum and registering their votes. Prior to the lex Gabinia tabellaria in 139 BC, votes were given orally; afterwards, votes deposited into an urn.

The order in which the centuries changed in the second century BC due to a reform in the comitia's organisation. Prior to the reform, the equestrian centuries voted first, followed by the classes in rank order. After the reform, a century was selected by lot from the juniores of the first class to vote first (the centuria praerogativa). Within the century the members would vote by head; the winners of this first century's votes would then be announced. Afterwards, the rest of the first class voted, followed by the equestrian centuries and then the (possibly senatorial) sex suffragia. The results in all cases were periodically announced. When a candidate secured a majority, he was declared victorious and no more votes could be given to him; once all posts were filled or a decision reached, voting ended and all those who had not yet voted were dismissed.

If the comitia centuriata were assembled instead of vote on a law, which was comparatively rare, a similar process was observed where after the prayer, a speech was given by the presiding magistrate. Afterwards, the centuries divided to vote for or against the motion.

== Apportionment ==
The apportionment of the centuries was nakedly timocratic, with the rich and the old massively over-represented. There were two different ways that the centuries were apportioned. However, both organisations retained some key features.

The highest rank in the system were those of the equestrians. They received eighteen centuries of 193 total centuries (9.33 per cent). However, these were reserved only for those who were equites equo publico (cavalry on public horse), which made up only 1,800 men (around 0.20 per cent of the population). This persisted through to the late republic, where the electorate numbered around 910,000. Among the equites were also six centuries called the sex suffragia. They received names, divided into priores and posteriores, according to the three Romulean tribes (Ramnes, Tities, and Luceres). While modern scholarship has long suggested that these six centuries were reserved for patricians, there is "no firm evidence" of this. Others have also conjectured that the 300 senators were allotted to these prestigious centuries.

Both organisations also retained the five class system, which ranked citizens into these five classes by their property as declared in the census. Beyond the classes were five supernumerary centuries: they were two centuries of artisans (smiths and carpenters) who voted with the first class, two centuries of musicians (trumpeters and horn-players) who voted with the fifth, and a single century for the proletarii who voted last. The proletarii, from which English gets the word "proletariat", were in Rome those without sufficient property to qualify for the fifth class and were seen as valuable to the state only in the children they would produce.

The structure of the assembly was recognised at the time as unequal. Cicero, for example, defends its inequality in De re publica, saying that "the suffragia [vote] should be in control not of the multitude but of the rich" and that the structure of the comitia was purposeful so that the principle that "the greatest number should not have the greatest influence", be observed. This was justified with the belief that the rich better understood the welfare of the state. The effect of this structure also meant that many times, the poorer citizens were never called to vote, since majorities would already have been reached; poorer citizens were only called when the elite was divided, an occurrence without substantial certainty.

=== Servian organisation ===
In the late third century or early second century BC, the division of centuries was as in the following table. There is no available information as to how this organisation developed through the period from its legendary institution by Servius to the version relayed in the sources. Moreover, it has been argued that the denomination of the proper qualifications in asses, a bronze coin, indicates that the qualifications were written down or at least translated into that denomination at a very late date.

Class	Property qualification (in asses)	Centuries	Proportion	Cumulative proportion
Equites equo publico	100,000+	12	6.22%	6.22%
First class	100,000+	80	41.5%	47.7%
Sex suffragia (also equites)	100,000+	6	3.11%	50.8%
Engineers	100,000+	2	1.04%	51.8%
Second class	75–100 thousand	20	10.4%	62.2%
Third class	50–75 thousand	20	10.4%	72.5%
Fourth class	25–50 thousand	20	10.4%	82.9%
Fifth class	12.5–25 thousand	30	15.5%	98.5%
Musicians (or horn blowers)	12.5–25 thousand	2	1.03%	99.5%
Proletarii	Less than 12,500	1	0.518%	100%

In this organisation, it is likely that selection as one of the equestrians was dependent not on a higher level of wealth – it was the same as for the first class – but on a social standing and reputation. All senators were, according to Cicero, equites equo publico and therefore placed within the eighteen centuries reserved for them, meaning that there were only some remaining 1,500 spots, largely reserved for sons and relations of senators or influential and wealthy citizens. However, a higher property qualification – by the late republic this as 400,000 sesterces – for the equestrians had likely been established by the Second Punic War.

Under this framework, the equites voted first. Following them were the first class. The two of them together made a majority of the 193 centuries. Because voting ended when a majority was reached, if the richest Romans agreed, the poorer classes were never called to vote. Sources differ as to where the engineers and musicians voted. Livy has the engineers and musicians vote with the first and fifth classes, respectively. Dionysius instead has the engineers and musicians vote with the second and fourth classes respectively.

=== Reforms and the centuria praerogativa ===
There was a reform of the comitia centuriata's apportionment in the mid-second century. It must have happened after 241 and most likely prior to 221. If, as has been argued on reconstruction of an inscription, it was brought by Quintus Fabius Maximus Verrucosus, it would have coincided with his censorship in 230. The reform aligned the assignment of citizens in centuries with their tribal assignments. It also saw reapportionment, reducing the number of centuries in the first class from 80 to 70 (seventy being double the thirty-five tribes) with one century each assigned to seniores and juniores (above and below the age of 45). It also introduced the centuria praerogativa. Many details of the reform are not entirely clear. It is not known whether the centuries below the first class were also aligned to tribal affiliations.

The details about the change in voting order are not entirely clear, but it is likely that the equites now voted after or at the same time as the first class. The sex suffragia also were moved from voting with the cavalry to voting after the first class. Moreover, after 129 BC, legislation was passed depriving senators of their public horses. This moved them out of the equites equo publico and likely into the first class. Cicero implies that the engineers remained voting with the first class, as had been the case prior to the reform.

The rationale for the reform has been variously explained. Some have suggested that it was intended to more equitably distribute the centuries among the people. Others have denied its impacts, arguing for example that the reapportionment was insufficient to change Roman electoral results in any significant way given that elections were by this point already contested into the second class of centuries. The least democratic explanation, however, would be an increase in voting power for the rich or the rural by taking its control of the tribes – where rural magnates enjoyed a substantial advantage – and mapping it directly onto the centuries as well.

==== Reapportionment ====
If the classes below the first class were also aligned to tribal affiliations, they would have produced seventy centuries in each class as well. This contradicts Ciceronean evidence that the total number of centuries after the reform remained 193. Scholars disagree as to how this was resolved.

One solution is to deny that the second through fifth classes were aligned with tribal divisions. The removed ten centuries from the first class was would then be redistributed to the other classes, though it is not known how this occurred. Lucy Grieve, in a 1985 article in Historia, suggests that the lower classes had equal representation with twenty-five centuries each.

Theodor Mommsen attempted to force the evidence to accord by positing that the second through fifth classes were divided tribally, creating the situation with seventy centuries for each class. Then, each class had its number of centuries reduced by lottery or rule such that two or three centuriae were combined into one, leading to the tribal centuries reassembling as a fewer number of artificial centuries. The tabula Hebana, discovered in 1947, gives a possible way that the centuries may have been redivided, namely by lot combining randomly selected tribal centuries into artificial voting centuries that would then be counted together.

==== Centuria praerogativa ====
The introduction of the centuria praerogativa and its bandwagoning effect also had the effect of sidelining the lower census classes. Because the prerogative century's vote was taken and then announced, it served as something akin to a religious omen for the Romans, who took such matters of chance within a religiously sanctified context (all votes began with purification, augury, and prayer) as revealing the wishes of the gods. Announcement of the prerogative century's vote thus served to guide later voters into the same path, minimising division within the upper census classes and, due to the structure of the assembly, prevent the poorer census classes from voting at all.

Even within the portions of the population which definitely voted, the effect of the prerogative century's selection by lot made it more difficult for candidates to target their campaigns. These barriers made it more likely that the winner would be selected semi-randomly. This was beneficial to the aristocracy which had a class interest in reducing competition between its members.

=== Sullan reforms and Italian enrolment ===
During Lucius Cornelius Sulla's first consulship in 88 BC, Appian reports there was a reversion of centuriate apportionment to the Servian system along with a restoration of the senate's probouleutic right to review all proposals before they went before any assembly. This may have occurred along with an abolition of the tribal assembly's legislative powers – making the centuries the only body capable of legislating – but such a restriction is rejected by the Cambridge Ancient History. The effect of reversion to Servian organisation would have been to allocate the richest of the new Italian citizens enfranchised by the Social War to the first class without involving them in the then on-going dispute about how fairly the citizens should be distributed among the tribes.

Whatever reforms Sulla conducted in 88 BC must have been discarded after Lucius Cornelius Cinna and Gaius Marius emerged victorious from the short Bellum Octavianum the following year. By the time Sulla returned and won his civil war, establishing his dictatorship, legislation was again being moved in the other assemblies.

While the Social War saw the enrolment of the Italians, they were not immediately able to vote in the comitia centuriata because they had not been assigned to a century. Attempts during and immediately after the Social War were unable to resolve this issue: the census of 89 was found religiously invalid and that of 86 was both disputed and failed to enrol much of the peninsula. This may have been put off purposefully so that the new citizens' suffrage rights would be delayed as long as possible, but regardless the census in 70 BC registered 900,000 citizens, almost double the 453,000 enrolled in 86.

== Decline ==
The emperor Tiberius, pictured, de facto transferred elections from the comitia centuriata to the senate by having it select the candidates to be presented to the people.

From Caesar's dictatorship through to the end of the Second Triumvirate (in 28 BC), elections were haphazard and, if they happened at all, occurred by slate: two candidates were permitted to stand for the two vacant posts which the assembly ratified. The putative "restoration of the republic" which Augustus began in 28 BC saw him elected consul through to 23 BC while exercising substantial control over elections; his abandonment of the consulship in 23 saw a return to robust electioneering and competition at Rome. The attempt in 19 BC, by an urban plebeian uprising, to secure the consulship for Marcus Egnatius Rufus, was suppressed by the lone consul and the senate with force. Following those elections and Egnatius' death, news of public electoral competition for the consulship largely disappears.

In accordance with the lex Valeria Cornelia, the comitia took on ten (later increased to twenty) centuries of equites and senators in AD 5. These centuries acted essentially as extremely influential prerogative centuries, as they selected a preferred list of candidates – termed destinati – prior to elections which was then announced to the public at the electoral assembly. The purpose of these prerogative centuries was to reduce the need for electoral canvassing, bribery, and riots. It also helped hide the emperor's role in the state behind influential men more aligned with him, allowing him to present the choices as the result of a concordia ordinum ("an agreement of the orders") rather than imperial fiat.

The election of destinati evidently by AD 14 was deemed insufficient; that year, early in the reign of the emperor Tiberius, the number of candidates brought before the people for the more junior posts, including the praetorship, was reduced to equal the number of places to be filled. Tiberius nominated some of the candidates, with the rest to be filled by decision of the senators themselves. Caligula temporarily reintroduced free elections for praetor, but by this point the comitia was unaccustomed to any kind of free choice, especially in the face of the senate's selection of destinati. Regardless, this was soon reversed, and by Nero's reign the entire slate of candidates was named by the emperor and then presented to the people for ratification.

The shift from somewhat-open elections under Augustus, where the emperor made the effort to campaign for his allies before the centuries and legislation was still necessary to rein in corrupt electoral practices, to the closed-slate voting of AD 14 marked the end of the comitia centuriata's role in elections, transforming it into a rubber stamp for decisions made by the senate and the emperor. It, however, continued to meet – ILS 6044 records a speech given where someone apologises for supporting Sejanus in the consular elections for AD 31 – even as the forum for electoral competition largely moved into the senate and thence into the imperial court.

The comitia centuriata still met to ratify the election of magistrates into the third century AD.

== See also ==
- Constitution of the Roman republic
- Elections in the Roman republic
- Comitia tributa

== Bibliography ==
=== Modern sources ===
- Arena, Valentina; Prag, Jonathan, eds. (2022). Companion to the political culture of the Roman republic. Wiley Blackwell. ISBN 978-1-119-67365-1. LCCN 2021024437.
  - Cornell, Tim C. "Roman political assemblies". In Arena & Prag (2022), pp. 220–35.
  - Tatum, W Jeffrey. "88 BCE". In Arena & Prag (2022), pp. 555–67.
- Broughton, Thomas Robert Shannon (1952). The magistrates of the Roman republic. Vol. 2. New York: American Philological Association.
- Bowman, Alan K; et al., eds. (1996). The Augustan empire, 43 BC–AD 69. Cambridge ancient history. Vol. 10 (2nd ed.). Cambridge University Press. ISBN 0-521-26430-8.
  - Purcell, Nicholas. "Rome and its development under Augustus and his successors". In CAH^{2} 10 (1996), pp. 782–811.
  - Wiedemann, T E J. "Tiberius to Nero". In CAH^{2} 10 (1996), pp. 198–255.
- Cornell, Tim (1995). The beginnings of Rome. London: Routledge. ISBN 0-415-01596-0. OCLC 31515793.
- Crook, John; et al., eds. (1994). The last age of the Roman Republic, 146–43 BC. Cambridge ancient history. Vol. 9 (2nd ed.). Cambridge University Press. ISBN 0-521-85073-8. OCLC 121060.
  - Cloud, Duncan. "The constitution and public criminal law". In CAH^{2} 9 (1994), pp. 491–530.
  - Seager, Robin. "Sulla". In CAH^{2} 9 (1994), pp. 165–207.
- Davenport, Caillan (2019). A history of the Roman equestrian order. Cambridge University Press. ISBN 978-1-107-03253-8.
- Drogula, Fred (2015). Commanders & command in the Roman republic and early empire. Chapel Hill: University of North Carolina Press. ISBN 978-1-4696-2314-6. OCLC 905949529.
- Flower, Harriet (2010). Roman republics. Princeton University Press. ISBN 978-0-691-14043-8. LCCN 2009004551.
- Forsythe, Gary (2005). A critical history of early Rome. Berkeley: University of California Press. ISBN 978-0-520-94029-1. OCLC 70728478.
- Grieve, Lucy J (1985). "The reform of the "comitia centuriata"". Historia: Zeitschrift für Alte Geschichte. 34 (3): 278–309. ISSN 0018-2311. JSTOR 4435929.
- Herulet, Frédéric (2011). "Consulship and consuls under Augustus". In Beck, Hans; et al. (eds.). Consuls and res publica. Cambridge University Press. pp. 319–35. ISBN 978-1-107-00154-1. LCCN 2011017494.
- Holladay, A J (1978). "The election of magistrates in the early principate". Latomus. 37 (4): 874–893. ISSN 0023-8856. JSTOR 41531092.
- Jones, A H M (1955). "Elections under Augustus". Journal of Roman Studies. 45 (1–2): 9–21. doi:10.2307/298739. ISSN 1753-528X. JSTOR 298739.
- Levick, B M (1967). "Imperial control of the elections under the early principate: commendatio, suffragatio, and "nominatio"". Historia: Zeitschrift für Alte Geschichte. 16 (2): 207–230. ISSN 0018-2311. JSTOR 4434982.
- Lintott, Andrew (1999). Constitution of the Roman republic. Oxford University Press. ISBN 978-0-19-926108-6. Reprinted 2009.
- Lomas, Kathryn (2018). The rise of Rome. History of the ancient world. Cambridge: Harvard University Press. doi:10.4159/9780674919938. ISBN 978-0-674-65965-0. S2CID 239349186.
- Millar, Fergus (1998). The crowd in Rome in the late republic. University of Michigan Press. ISBN 0-472-10892-1.
- Mommsen, Theodor (1887). Römisches Staatsrecht (in German). Leipzig: S Hirzel. 3 volumes.
- Mouritsen, Henrik (2001). Plebs and politics in the late Roman republic. Cambridge University Press. doi:10.1017/cbo9780511482885. ISBN 978-0-521-79100-7.
- Mouritsen, Henrik (2017). Politics in the Roman republic. Cambridge: Cambridge University Press. ISBN 978-1-107-03188-3. OCLC 961266598.
- Rafferty, David (2021). "Rural voters in Roman elections". TAPA. 151 (1): 127–153. doi:10.1353/apa.2021.0004. ISSN 2575-7199.
- Sandberg, Kaj (2018). "Sulla's reform of the legislative process". Età di Silla: atti del convegno. Roma: Istituto italiano per la storia antica. pp. 167–90.
- Santangelo, Federico (2014). "Roman politics in the 70s BC: a story of realignments?". Journal of Roman Studies. 104: 1–27. doi:10.1017/S0075435814000045. ISSN 0075-4358.
- Stone, A M (2005). "Optimates: an archaeology". In Welch, K; Hillard, T W (eds.). Roman crossings: theory and practice in the Roman republic. Classical Press of Wales. pp. 59–94.
- Tan, James (26 July 2023). "Geography and the reform of the comitia centuriata". Classical Quarterly. 73: 109–126. doi:10.1017/S0009838823000484. ISSN 0009-8388.

=== Ancient sources ===
- Appian (1913) [2nd century AD]. Civil wars. Loeb classical library. Translated by White, Horace – via LacusCurtius.
- Cicero (1928). De republica [On the republic]. Loeb classical library. Translated by Keyes, Clinton W – via Attalus.org.
- Cicero (1891). Pro Plancio [For Plancus]. Translated by Yonge, C D. George Bell & Sons – via Perseus under Philologic.
- Cassius Dio (1914–27) [c. AD 230]. Roman history. Loeb classical library. Translated by Cary, Earnest – via LacusCurtius. (Nine volumes.)
- Dionysius of Halicarnassus (1937–50) [1st century BC]. Roman antiquities. Loeb classical library. Translated by Cary, Ernest – via LacusCurtius.
- Livy (1905) [1st century AD]. From the founding of the city . Translated by Roberts, Canon – via Wikisource.
- Polybius (1922–27) [2nd century BC]. Histories. Loeb classical library. Translated by Paton, W R – via LacusCurtius.
- Tacitus (1925–37). Annales. Loeb classical library. Translated by Jackson, J – via LacusCurtius.
