= Firefighting in ancient Rome =

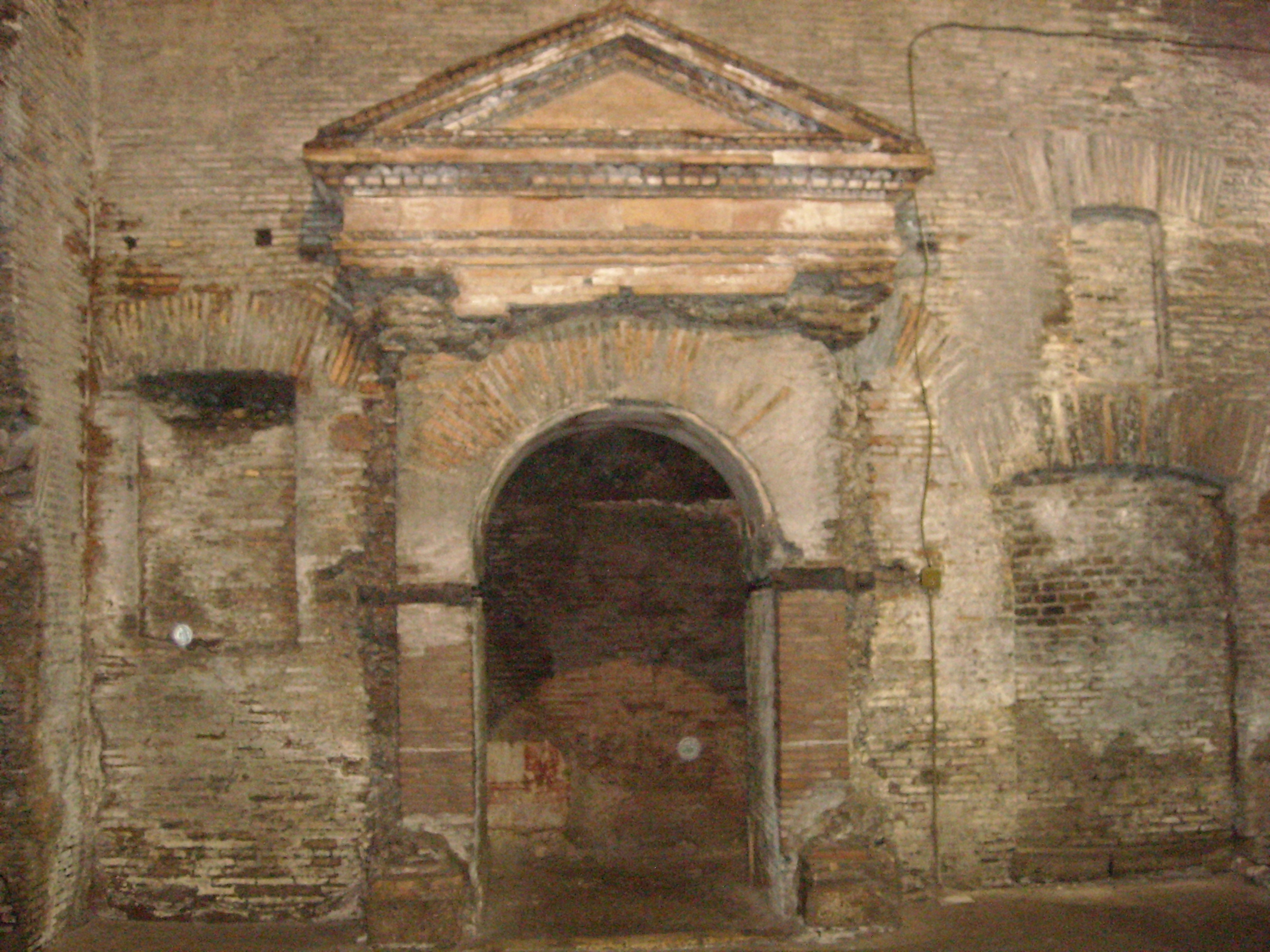
Aedicula of the Excubitorium of the 7th cohort of the Vigiles in Rome

During the Roman Republic, there were watchmen that served as firefighters. They used water buckets to put out fires and axes to tear down buildings near the fire in order to prevent the fire from spreading. The aediles and tresviri nocturni were also employed to fight fires. Roman Emperor Augustus created the Vigiles. The Vigiles were an organization of freedmen that fought fires. They would use buckets and water pumps. Emperor Nero also created "bucket brigades" to help fight fires.

== Organization and history ==
Most ancient Roman cities had no firefighting organizations or equipment dedicated to fighting fires. There were early groups of watchmen who used buckets of water to put out fires. During the Roman Republic, there were several organizations dedicated to firefighting. These were the tresviri nocturni, and the aediles also helped put out fires. The tresviri nocturni, later known as tresviri capitales, had a small group of slaves which would fight fires. Sometimes, in particularly dire situations, a consul would be called to fight fires. Tribunes may also have been involved. Some wealthy individuals would form their own personal fire brigades. An aedile by the name of Egnatius Rufus created a band of slaves that were tasked with putting out fires. His motivation was either to help the Roman people or to gain political status. In 21 BC, Augustus reorganized Rufus' slaves, creating a new group of 600 slaves led by the aediles. Eventually, Augustus created a fire brigade called the Vigiles Urbani in 6 AD. The Vigiles numbered 7,000 men, and were divided into cohorts of 1,000 men. Each cohort was responsible for two regions. Overall, the Vigiles were commanded by an equestrian called the praefectus vigilum. Nero would later create bucket brigades to patrol the streets of Rome.

Pliny the Younger wrote about the need for fire fighting organizations.

While I was making a progress in a different part of the province, a most extensive fire broke out at Nicomedia, which not only consumed several private houses, but also two public buildings; the town-house and the temple of Isis, though they stood on contrary sides of the street. The occasion of its spreading thus far was partly owing to the violence of the wind, and partly to the indolence of the people, who, manifestly, stood idle and motionless spectators of this terrible calamity. The truth is the city was not furnished with either engines, [1033]buckets, or any single instrument suitable for extinguishing fires; which I have now however given directions to have prepared. You will consider, Sir, whether it may not be advisable to institute a company of fire-men, consisting only of one hundred and fifty members. I will take care none but those of that business shall be admitted into it, and that the privileges granted them shall not be applied to any other purpose. As this corporate body will be restricted to so small a number of members, it will be easy to keep them under proper regulation.

— Pliny, Letters of Pliny

Trajan, the emperor at the time responded by saying:

You are of opinion it would be proper to establish a company of firemen in Nicomedia, agreeably to what has been practised in several other cities. But it is to be remembered that societies of this sort have greatly disturbed the peace of the province in general, and of those cities in particular. Whatever name we give them, and for whatever purposes they may be founded, they will not fail to form themselves into factious assemblies, however short their meetings may be. It will therefore be safer to provide such machines as are of service in extinguishing fires, enjoining the owners of houses to assist in preventing the mischief from spreading, and, if it should be necessary, to call in the aid of the populace.

— Trajan, Letters of Pliny

== Methods ==
The imperial-era Vigiles would patrol the streets of Rome looking for fires. They would use axes, catapults, or ballistae to destroy buildings near a fire to prevent the fire from spreading. It is possible this is the origin of the phrase "hook and ladder". The Vigiles could also use buckets and water pumps to extinguish fires.
