= Portico of Agrippa =

Portico of Agrippa (Latin: Porticus Agrippae) may refer to:

- Porticus Argonautarum
- Porticus Vipsania
