= Equites equo publico =

The equites equo publico ("equestrians with the public horse") was an ordo, or status group, of elite citizens in the Roman Republic, and later the Roman Empire, who were provided money from the state treasury (12,000 asses) to purchase and maintain a horse. During the republic there were only 1,800 of equites equo publico; by the late republic, only men with property worth some 400,000 sesterces were enrolled.

They differed in status from the equites equo suo ("equestrians with their own horse") who in the middle republic served in the cavalry and had a similar wealth qualification but were not enrolled in the prestigious equestrian centuries of the comitia centuriata and did not receive public subsidies. Prior to 129 BC, senators were also equites equo publico; after legislation that came into effect that year, all senators were required to give up their public horses.

== Details ==
Equites equo publico were men who met a proper qualification of 100,000 asses and received 10,000 asses from the state treasury to purchase a horse and a further 2,000 to maintain it. This emerged early Rome's need for cavalry and equites equo publico were expected to serve in that role for the city for a period of 10 years. Over time these cavalrymen, proximate in wealth and status to the senators, became a social and political elite, binding wealthy men (eventually across Italy) to the republican system.

After 403 BC, the 1,800 men with the public horse were joined on horses by any other men who met a similar property qualification who were called equites equo suo ("equestrians with their own horse"; also equites equo privato). The equites equo suo may have had the same property qualification as those with the public horse but some scholars have argued that their property qualifications were somewhat lower. By the middle republic the equites equo suo outnumbered those on the public horse dramatically: in 225 BC there were 23,000 cavalrymen but only 1,800 of them were equites equo publico.

The equites equo publico were highly prestigious both socially and politically, endowed with the social prestige of enrolment in the elite equestrian voting centuries with their disproportionate voting power as well as perks such as reserved seats at games and theatres. The eighteen equestrian centuries in the comitia centuriata, with 100 men each, were made up only of the equites equo publico, with the equites equo suo relegated to the first census class. Magistrates, including old ones, retained the public horse even though they were not expected to serve in the cavalry again. Although the late republic saw the decline of military service among the rich, some equites equo publico continued to serve in the army.

In 129 BC senators were required by law to give up their public horses, separating them cleanly from the equites equo publico and after 123 BC equites equo publico without senatorial relatives were called to serve on juries for the permanent courts (quaestiones perpetuae). After the passage of the lex Aurelia in 70 BC, the juries on those permanent courts – according to a common modern reconstruction – was made up in three equal parts by senators, equites equo publico, and the tribuni aerarii who were also equites equo suo.

During the imperial period, the public horse became a title bestowed by the emperor for good service or to bolster loyalty from provincial elites; actual cavalry service did not occur. Modern scholars including Theodor Mommsen and TP Wiseman believe that over the course of the first century AD, the equites equo suo gradually merged into the equites equo publico. The title disappeared in the early 3rd century.

== Bibliography ==
- Brunt, P A (1988). The fall of the Roman Republic and related essays. Oxford: Clarendon Press. ISBN 978-0-19-814849-4.
- Davenport, Caillan (2019). A history of the Roman equestrian order. Cambridge University Press. ISBN 978-1-107-03253-8.
- Millar, Fergus; Burton, Graham (2012). "equites, Imperial period". Oxford Classical Dictionary. doi:10.1093/acrefore/9780199381135.013.7202. ISBN 978-0-19-938113-5.
- Rosenstein, Nathan (2007). "Military command, political power, and the Republican elite". In Erdkamp, Paul (ed.). A companion to the Roman army. Blackwell. pp. 132–47. ISBN 978-1-4051-2153-8.
- Rosenstein, Nathan (2016). "Tributum in the middle Republic". Circum Mare: themes in ancient warfare. Brill. pp. 80–97. ISBN 978-90-04-28484-5.
