= Lex Valeria (82 BC) =

Roman law creating Sulla as dictator

The lex Valeria was a law in 82 BC which established the dictatorship of Lucius Cornelius Sulla. Going around the traditional process for nominating a dictator, the law ratified Sulla's previously illegal actions (especially his proscriptions) and facilitated Sulla's goal of effecting large-scale reforms to the Roman Republic by granting him constituent legislative power.

== Passage ==
After Sulla's proscriptions purged his political enemies from the state and the close of the civil war with the Battle of the Colline Gate, Sulla turned to restoring and restructuring the republic. To do this, he had himself created as dictator.

Accounts of the specific means by which Sulla achieved his elevation to the dictatorship differ. Appian's account, which is the most detailed one and corroborated by Cicero, describes appointment by means of legislation passed by the people of Rome. This legislation was moved in comitia centuriata by Lucius Valerius Flaccus (then the princeps senatus and also interrex in the absence of consuls) after Flaccus received a letter so recommending from Sulla. The law passed simply named Sulla dictator, following a precedent previously established for Quintus Fabius Maximus Verrucosus. This was presumably followed by the requisite lex curiata de imperio.

After passage of the law, Flaccus was appointed magister equitum. Sulla also became the first dictator since Gaius Servilius Geminus some 120 years earlier at the end of the Second Punic War. No dictator would again be appointed until Julius Caesar's temporary assumption of the office in 49 BC and more permanent assumption from 46 through to his death on 15 March 44 BC (a few months after Caesar was created dictator perpetuo).

== Sulla's powers ==
The lex Valeria created Sulla as dictator legis scribundis et rei publicae constituendae. The causa was, according to Appian, for the enactment of laws and the regulation of the republic. The law set no fixed term for the dictatorship – six months, as would have been traditional, – but instead created Sulla dictator "until such time as he should firmly reestablish the city and Italy and the government in general".

As dictator of Rome, Sulla was granted the power to make numerous decisions within the state. More importantly, as Boatwright notes, "his appointment to it specifically validated all his actions in advance". The lex Valeria ratified all of his previous actions, including the proscriptions.

In consequence of the broad authority granted by the lex Valeria, Sulla effected a number of constitutional reforms. Beyond his legislative powers, he gained powers to:

- execute anybody without a trial and enact legislation without going through one of the assemblies,
- control the public finances,
- appoint new senators (he increased the number of senators from around 300 to 600),
- change the number of quaestors and praetors (to, respectively, 20 and 8), and
- create laws governing the cursus honorum and minimum ages for various magistracies.

His constitutional reforms also changed the nature of the plebeian tribunate. He barred any ex-tribune from holding any other magisterial post and drastically limited their powers; they were permitted to bring legislation approved by the senate and traditional veto authority was preserved. With his legislative powers, he also removed the equites from the juries of the permanent tribunals (quaestiones perpetuae) and abolished the state sale of subsidised grain created by Gaius Sempronius Gracchus. He also instituted new laws to constrain the actions of provincial governors – requiring that they go and stay in the province, not leave without permission, and not start any wars without authorisation – and abolished the election of priests.

Sulla gave up the dictatorship after a short term; he abdicated his dictatorship at the end of 81 and entered an ordinary consulship for 80 BC. His curtailing of the plebeian tribunate's powers and exclusion of the equites from the juries were fully reverted in 70 BC; other reforms, such as the abolition grain dole were also reverted in the coming decades.
