= Tresviri capitales =

The tresviri capitales or tresviri nocturni were a college of minor magistrates in ancient Rome. They were included in the vigintisexviri, a board of 26 minor magistrates ranked below the quaestors. They were a group of three men that managed police and firefighting. Despite this they were feared by the Roman people due to their police roles, and they were condemned due to their neglect of firefighting during an unknown incident, which was likely the Great Fire of Rome. The Roman people gave the Tresviri Capitales the nickname nocturni due to the night patrols they managed. They were elected by the Urban praetors and later Tribal Assembly.

== Role ==
The Tresviri Capitales managed the police in Ancient Rome. They were somewhat feared by the citizens of Rome. Although the Tresviri Capitales had criminal jurisdiction over the people of Rome, they did not have judicial jurisdiction. They dispensed justice in the forum, supervised executions, and castigated thieves and slaves. Also, they, along with the aediles, organized special guard troops dedicated to arresting criminals. Although they could only do this with a mandate from the Senate and other higher magistrates. The Tresviri Capitales most likely handled ordinary crimes that would not be handled by the Popular Assembly or Courts. Another explanation is that thieves caught whilst stealing would be brought to the Tresviri Capitales, to whom the criminal would then confess or deny his crime. Aside from policing Rome, they also arrested and punished runaway slaves. However, this does not necessarily mean the Tresviri Capitales searched for the slaves. Fines and fees for starting lawsuits would be collected by the Tresviri Capitales. Another legal duty of the Tresviri Capitales was managing Roman prisons. The Tresviri Capitales were one group responsible for firefighting in Rome. They organized nightly patrols. The people of Rome condemned the Tresviri Capitales for neglecting their responsibility of firefighting on an unknown occasion. This occasion was likely the Great Fire of Rome.

== History and organization ==
The Tresviri Capitales were formed around 290 or 287 BCE. Their name was derived from their groups supervision of the prison and executions that took place there. According to Plautus when they were founded they were a group of three men that would be elected by the Urban Praetors. The Tresviri Capitales changed the way Roman society utilized the death penalty. The death penalty was a state tool instead of a private matter carried out due to vengeance. Sometime between 242 and 122 BCE a Lex Papiria ordered that the Tresviri Capitales would be elected by the Comitia Tributa, which is also known as Tribal Assembly. During the year 213 BCE, after complaining from Roman citizens, the Tresviri Capitales would take action against the practice of foreign cults in public spaces. They destroyed the places of worship for these cults. Later the Senate put an Urban Praetor in charge of taking action against the practice of foreign cults in public places.
