= Saepta Julia =

Late Roman Republic polling center

The Saepta Julia was a building in the Campus Martius of Rome, where citizens gathered to cast votes. The building was conceived by Julius Caesar and dedicated by Marcus Vipsanius Agrippa in 26 BC. The building replaced an older structure, called the Ovile, built as a place for the comitia tributa to gather to cast votes. The Saepta Julia can be seen on the Forma Urbis Romae, a map of the city of Rome as it existed in the early 3rd century AD. Part of the original wall of the Saepta Julia can still be seen right next to the Pantheon.

== History ==
The conception of the Saepta Julia, which also goes by Saepta or Porticus Saeptorum, began during the reign of Julius Caesar. It took the form of a quadriporticus, an architectural feature made popular by Caesar.

After Caesar's assassination in 44 BC, work continued on projects that Caesar had set into motion. Marcus Aemilius Lepidus, who had supported Caesar before his death, and subsequently aligned with his successor Octavian, took on the continuation of the Saepta Julia building project. The building was finally completed and dedicated by Marcus Vipsanius Agrippa in 26 BC. Agrippa also decorated the building with marble tablets and Greek paintings.

The Great Fire of Rome led to its destruction in AD 80. It was rebuilt sometime before the reign of Domitian. Restoration also took place under Hadrian, as is evidenced by brick-work and literary sources. The building is also attested on a post-Constantine bronze collar of a slave, but there is no known mention of the building in the Middle Ages.

The Saepta Julia can be seen on the Forma Urbis Romae, a map of the city of Rome as it existed in the early 3rd century AD. Part of the original wall of the Saepta Julia can still be seen right next to the Pantheon

== Plan ==
Due to the limited archaeological remains, the majority of archaeological reconstructions are derived from the Forma Urbis Romae and corresponding literary sources. Located on the Campus Martius, between the Baths of Agrippa and the Serapeum, the Saepta Julia was a rectangular porticus complex, which extended along the west side of the Via Lata to the Via di S. Marco. It was 310 meters long by 120 meters wide and was built of travertine marble. Two porticoes lay on the east and west of the complex. The north end was a lobby, and the south side connected to the Diribitorium through an uncolonnaded, broad corridor. The only entrances that have been discerned are minor entrances on the south end of the complex.

Archaeological excavations underneath the Palazzo Doria uncovered multiple travertine piers. While the majority of the piers measured 1.7 meters square, other piers showed a variety of dimensions. This has led some scholars to speculate on the existence of a second floor.

The Saepta was supplied with water by Aqua Virgo, which supplied the majority of buildings on the Campus Martius.

=== Porticus Argonautarum ===
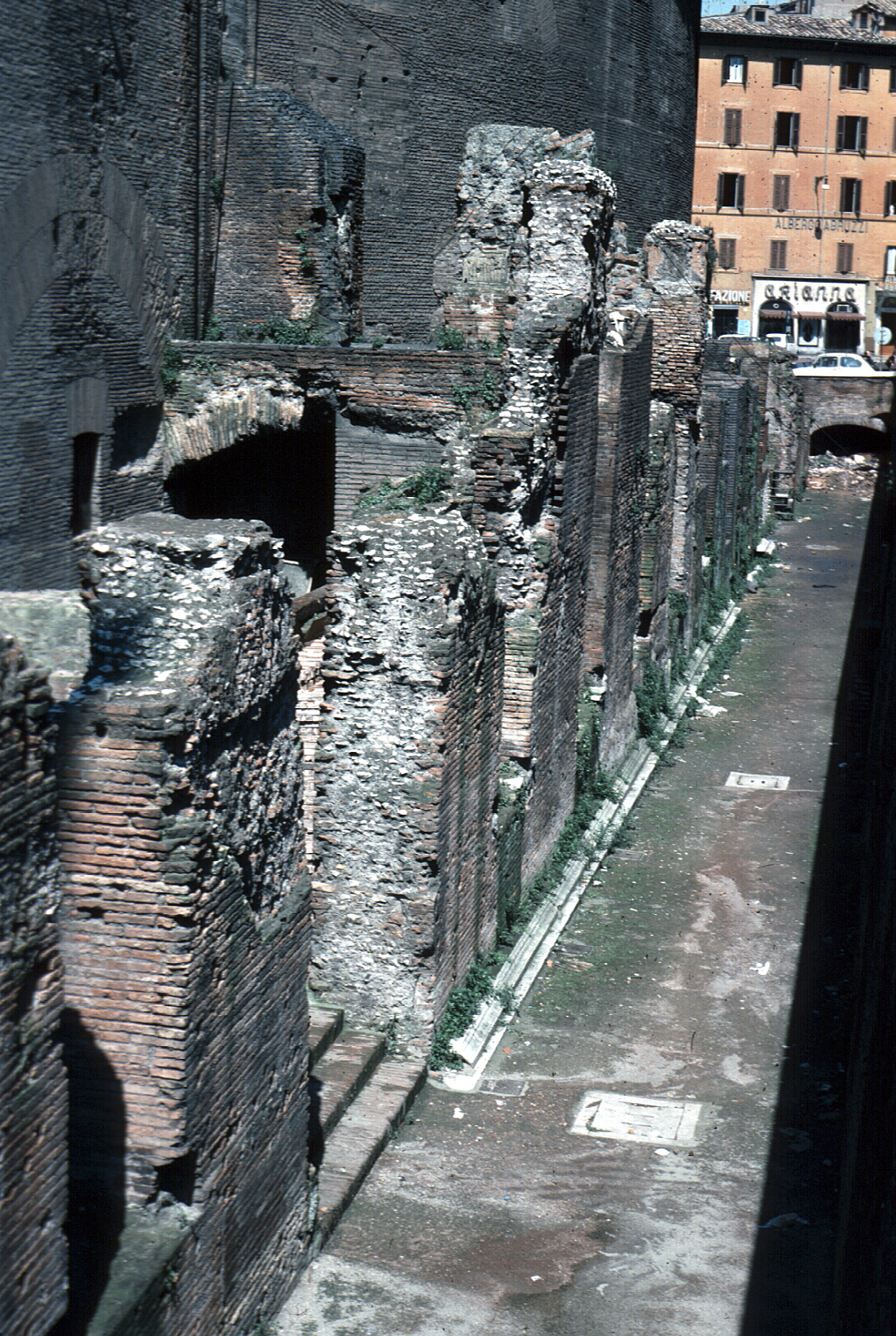
Western wall of the Porticus Argonautarum

The Porticus Argonautarum lined the western side of the Saepta Julia. It was completed by Agrippa ca. 25 BC, and received its name from the artwork it depicted, which showed Jason and the Argonauts. A portion of the western wall survives, and is located beside the Pantheon, and suggests that it was made of brick-faced concrete, and covered in marble. Reconstructed by Domitian after the fire of AD 80, this portico was also part of Hadrian's reconstruction of the entire Saepta Julia.

=== Porticus Meleagri ===
The Porticus Meleagri lined the eastern side of the Saepta Julia. Little remains of the Porticus Meleagri, and location and reconstruction rely primarily on the Forma Urbis Romae. Although not mentioned, it was most likely constructed during the final decades of the first century BC, along with the dedication of the Saepta.

== Use ==
The concept of the Saepta was initially planned by Caesar in place of the earlier Ovile, and was projected as early as 54 BC, and finished by Agrippa in 26 BC. In a letter to Atticus, Cicero writes that the building was to be made of marble, with a lofty portico and a roof.

The building was initially intended to be used as a voting place for both the comitia centuriata and the comitia tributa. However, with the diminishing importance of the voting comitias from the Augustan period onward, the building began to be repurposed. Gladiatorial combats were exhibited during the period of Augustus, and the building was also used by the senate as a meeting point.

When Tiberius returned from Germany, after his military procession, he was presented in this building by Augustus. Both Augustus and Caligula used this building for naumachiae. It was used for gymnastics competitions and exhibitions during the reign of Nero. Statius and Martial report that it was used intermittently as a public space for Roman citizens, as well as a market for luxury goods.

== See also ==
- Porticus Argonautarum
- Diribitorium
