= Vigintisexviri =

College of minor magistrates of the Roman Republic

The vigintisexviri (sg. vigintisexvir; lit. 'twenty-six men') were a college (collegium) of minor magistrates (magistratus minores) in the Roman Republic. The college consisted of six boards:

- the decemviri stlitibus judicandis – 10 magistrates who judged lawsuits, including those dealing with whether a man was free or a slave;
- the tresviri capitales, also known as nocturni – three magistrates who had a police function in Rome, in charge of prisons and the execution of criminals;
- the tresviri monetales or tresviri aere argento auro flando feriundo – three magistrates who were in charge of striking and casting bronze, silver and gold (minting coins);
- the quattuorviri viis in urbe purgandis – four magistrates overseeing road maintenance within the city of Rome;
- the duoviri viis extra urbem purgandis – two magistrates overseeing road maintenance in the suburbs around the city of Rome proper; and
- the four praefecti Capuam Cumas – praefecti sent to Capua and Cumae in Campania to administer justice there.

Being a member of the vigintisexviri was a prerequisite to the quaestorship after the reforms of Sulla. The label used for these magistrates may only have been introduced after Sullan times, but the first of the constituent boards may date back to the third century BC.

The duoviri viis extra urbem purgandis and the four praefecti Capuam Cumas were abolished by Augustus c. 13 BC, reducing the vigintisexviri to the vigintiviri. In AD 13, the senate restricted eligibility, ordaining that only equites should be eligible to the college of the then-vigintiviri. The remaining boards were not abolished entirely until at least the third century.
