= Lucius Quinctius =

Roman politician (born c. 124 BC)

Lucius Quinctius (born c. 124 BC) was a politician of the late Roman Republic. A homo novus associated with the populares, he was tribune of the plebs in 74 BC and praetor in 67 BC.

Quinctius is characterised by Cicero as a man well fitted to speak in public assemblies (Cic. Brut. 62). He distinguished himself by his violent opposition to the constitutional reforms of Lucius Cornelius Sulla, and endeavoured to regain for the tribunes the power of which they had been deprived. The unpopularity excited against the judges by the general belief that they had been bribed by Cluentius to condemn Oppianicus, was of service to Quinctius in attacking another of Sulla's measures, by which the judges were taken exclusively from the senatorial order. Quinctius warmly espoused the cause of Oppianicus, constantly asserted his innocence, and raised the flame of popular indignation to such a height, that Junius, who had presided at the trial, was obliged to retire from public life. Quinctius, however, was not strong enough to obtain the repeal of any of Sulla's laws. The consul Lucullus opposed him vigorously in public, and induced him, by persuasion in private, says Plutarch, to abandon his attempts. It is not improbable that the aristocracy made use of the powerful persuasion of money to keep him quiet.

In 68 BC Quinctius was praetor, perhaps because of Crassus's support. He took his revenge upon his old enemy Lucullus, by inducing the senate to send him a successor in his province, although he had, according to a statement of Sallust, received money from Lucullus to prevent the appointment of a successor.
