= Diribitorium =

Ancient building in Rome, Italy

The diribitorium was a public voting hall situated on the campus Martius in Ancient Rome. In this building, the votes cast by the people were counted by diribitores (election officials). Construction of the building was started by Marcus Agrippa but finished by Augustus in 7 BC.

"Its roof had the widest span of any building erected in Rome before 230 A.D., and was supported by beams of larch one hundred feet long and one and a half feet thick." According to Cassius Dio, the diribitorium was among a number of public buildings that were destroyed by fire in 80 AD, and subsequently rebuilt by Emperor Titus.

Christian Hülsen proposed a theory that the diribitorium was a second story atop the Saepta.

== See also ==
- List of Greco-Roman roofs
