= Polemius Silvius =

5th century Roman author

Polemius Silvius (fl. 5th century) was the author of an annotated Julian calendar that attempted to integrate the traditional Roman festival cycle with the new Christian holy days. His calendar, also referred to as a laterculus or fasti, dates to around 448–449. He was active in southeastern Gaul.

== Background ==
Polemius was among the Christian cultural elite working within the imperial bureaucracy in Gaul under Valentinian III. He was a friend of Hilary of Arles. The Gallic Chronicle of 452, year 438, knows of one Sylvius, whom some historians conjecture to be Polemius.

Polemius was assigned to Eucherius, bishop of Lyon (ancient Lugdunum), and produced the calendar for him. Because fixed Christian feasts were still few in number, Polemius faced the challenge of fulfilling the conventions of a traditional Roman calendar with named holidays while "disinfecting" it of the Imperial Roman and other festivals now regarded as "pagan." Although the Calendar of Filocalus had recorded the traditional religious holidays freely, by the time of Polemius the Christian state had begun to legislate against other religions and to divorce Rome's religious heritage from the culture and civic life of the Empire. Polemius, who had probably consulted the Calendar of Filocalus, filled gaps with meteorological and seasonal markers, and the "Egyptian days," days considered unpropitious for new undertakings and for certain medical practices. Bede was among those who drew information from it.

In Polemius's calendar, the word ludi, "games" in classical Latin, means more specifically theatrical performances, while circenses is used for chariot races. His work provides significant examples of Gallo-Romance vocabulary, regional variations of the Latin language, and local survivals of Gaulish words.

== The calendar ==
The format used by Polemius for the most part followed the conventions of Roman calendars, with days arranged in parallel columns under the name of the month, and each day noted on a separate line. Column 1 numbers the days of the month. Column 2 identifies any special days, not only traditional Roman and Christian holidays, but also the birthdays of emperors, and days when consuls and praetors took office. Column 3 gives weather conditions; Columella's 1st-century treatise on agriculture may have influenced the inclusion of references to weather. Polemius also provided information from his own research, such as the birthdays of Cicero, Vergil, and a Faustina who was the divinized wife (diva) of an Antonine emperor.

Because the Roman calendar had traditionally served a didactic purpose, the laterculus of Polemius provided several other lists and tables under the month-by-month chronographic presentation:

- emperors and usurpers;
- the Roman provinces;
- animal names, spread out over two months;
- a table for calculating the date of Easter and the phases of the moon (not extant);
- buildings and topographical features of Rome;
- fabulae poeticae ("poets' tales");
- a breviary of Roman history;
- "a register of animal voices";
- weights and measures;
- meters of poetry (not extant);
- a survey of philosophical sects (not extant).

Lost portions are known only from the introductory synopsis. For each month, the calendar also presents the equivalent Hebrew, Egyptian, Athenian, and Greek names.

== List of Provinces ==
Polemius Silvius also wrote a list of Late Roman provinces, which Seeck appended to his edition of the Notitia Dignitatum. The list is famous because it names six provinces in Roman Britannia: the sixth is the dubious "Orcades provincia".
