= Aedile =

Roman republican magistrate charged with city maintenance and order

An aedile or edile (English: /ˈiːdaɪl/ EE-dyl) was a magistrate in the Roman Republic who had responsibilities for the upkeep of the city, such as its buildings, roads, and markets; the availability of grain at reasonable prices; and the holding of games. It also had some judicial functions, being able to issue fines and corporal punishments with an additional right to prosecute crimes before the assemblies, but by the middle republic was mostly an office used for distributing largesse to win the officeholder popular acclaim.

There were two kinds of aediles, plebeian aediles and curule aediles. The former were, according to Roman tradition, the first aediles created (c. 494 BC), initially as assistants to the plebeian tribunes, with the curule aediles created c. 367 BC. The plebeian aediles, even though originally tribunician assistants, assimilated with the curule aediles: by the middle republic, aediles were junior to praetors and senior to quaestors, with the tribunate usually held before an aedilate. The two types of aediles had largely the same duties.

The duties of the aediles did not long survive the republic. While the office continued to exist under the empire, many of their public functions were assumed by the emperor or his appointees. There were, however, aediles in self-governing communities outside of Rome who continued to be elected by and support their localities in much the same way the republican aediles at Rome did.

== Etymology ==
The Latin word for aedile, aedilis, is derived from the word aedes (meaning temple or dwelling place) with the suffix -ilis.

== Roman aediles ==
There were two kinds of aediles: curule and plebeian. Curule aediles were elected in the tribal assembly, while plebeian aediles were elected in the plebeian council from plebeian candidates by a plebeian tribune. While curule aediles possessed a curule chair, they did not possess imperium or the immunity from prosecution which it implied.

By the late middle republic the two pairs of aediles had largely overlapping duties in the upkeep of temples, markets, and streets. They were also responsible for two major sets of annual games: the curule aediles held the ludi Romani and the Megalensian games; the plebeian aediles held the ludi plebii and the Floralian and Cerealian games. Plebeian aediles also had responsibilities to keep plebeian records, which were likely stored at the Temple of Ceres on the Aventine.

It was not necessary to hold the aedilate as part of the cursus honorum; however, if held, by the middle and late republic it usually was held after the plebeian tribunate and before the praetorship. Customarily, though not entirely observed by the late republic, two years had to elapse between the holding of the aedilate and the praetorship.

=== Responsibilities ===
One of the main responsibilities of the aediles was management of Rome's marketplaces. This included a responsibility to ensure the availability of grain and tolerable prices. Aediles managed markets by promulgating an edict specifying the Rome's commercial law and regulations observed therein, while also providing men to ensure the proper enforcement of those rules. Aediles also had a role in stabilising grain prices, but until the development of public granaries from Gaius Gracchus' tribunate in 122 BC, the aediles' ability to achieve this goal was limited and contingent on officeholders' foreign contacts, their financial resources, and the availability of shipping.

Aediles also possessed a general cura urbis. This entailed caring for the condition of streets and public buildings (such as basilicas and temples). At times this could also include the construction of new buildings, such as the erection of shops on the Tiber and a porticus by the aedilican pairs of 193 and 192 BC. Aediles also supervised more junior city magistrates such as the triumviri capitales or nocturni, who were part of the minor vigintisexviri, in their law enforcement duties.

Both curule and plebeian aediles possessed the power to prosecute by iudicium populi before the tribal assembly. The offences that aediles could prosecute were essentially unlimited, with attested aedilican prosecutorial jurisdiction over provocatio (violation of citizen appeal rights), vis (public violence), tax evasion, usury, veneficia (witchcraft), and stuprum (sexual assault). These judicial powers were exercised without imperium and also included the authority to issue summary corporal punishments.

This prosecutorial power also entailed the ability to assess fines from offenders, which were often used to defray costs incurred in the upkeep of the city. Indeed, aedilician fines collected from usurers or illegal graziers, are attested to have been used temple construction and games. However, many of the costs incurred were also paid for by the officeholders: this was especially the case with games which, when splendid, could win the man who paid for them substantial popularity with the voters. This was recognised by 182 BC, when Tiberius Gracchus spent so much as curule aedile on games that legislation was passed in 179 to put a cap on expenditures.

=== Development ===
The annalistic tradition suggests that the first aediles at Rome were the plebeian pair, created as assistants to the plebeian tribunes with judicial powers in 494 BC. Livy also suggests that these first plebeian aediles were sacrosanct, like the tribunes, but this has been doubted. Some scholars have also suggested that the plebeian aediles first emerged as priests of the goddess Ceres but there is no ancient evidence of this.

The curule aediles, in the annalistic tradition, were created in the Licinio-Sextian settlement from 367 BC: plebeians being eligible for the consulship and the consular tribunate suppressed, a praetorship along with two curule aediles were added. Large parts of this tradition, which place the impulse for these reforms in the conflict between patricians and plebeians, have been doubted; the reforms before 367 may instead have largely reflected the city-state's then need for more specialised governance. If the curule aedilate was intended to be exclusive to the patricians, this was quickly dropped. Annalistic accounts of a compromise where alternating years had plebeian and patrician pairs as curule aedile, if at all accurate, did not reflect late republican practice which saw no such alternation.

The acquisition of Rome's overseas provinces and entanglements likely catalysed the development of aedilican responsibilities: consuls and some praetors would regularly have been absent from the city commanding troops; plebeian tribunes on the other hand, in their more political role, would have had little time for administrative affairs.

=== Decline ===
The dictator Julius Caesar introduced two more aediles in 44 BC. They may have been entrusted with care for the city's grain supply, the ludi Cereales, or both. If these new aediles had responsibilities for the grain supply, their powers over it were likely stripped in 22 BC, when Augustus assumed responsibility over that matter. The two aediles Cereales, however, were not disestablished; they likely were instead reassigned to other customary aedilician tasks.

The emergence of huge building projects during the triumviral period, which continued into the early empire under Augustus, tended against the continued relevance of the aediles. The expense of holding the office, along with the few political benefits, had by 33 BC made it something to avoid. That year, Augustus had his friend and ally Marcus Vipsanius Agrippa (who had previously been praetor and consul in 40 and 37 BC respectively) hold the office of aedile: Agrippa promptly started a huge building programme, repaired three aqueducts, began construction of a new one, and spent lavishly on games. In the years after Agrippa's aedilate, however, many of the customary maintenance functions of temples, aqueducts, and roads were assigned to the emperor in the name of the senate rather than kept with the annual aediles.

Most of the aedilician responsibilities for public order were also stripped from the period after 44 BC, though some powers over public markets (especially the sale of goods) and jurisdiction over sumptuary laws was retained.

== Non-Roman aediles ==
Other cities in Italy also had their own aediles and they were also a standard feature of Roman municipia. Municipia were commonly run by a board of four magistrates: the town's chief magistrates, the duoviri with two aediles. This arrangement was common in attested colonies in Spain, but not all municipalities necessarily followed such a division. It was likely that, in some towns, there was a senior college of quattorviri assisted with two aediles.

Elections for these positions were generally conducted in similar form to Roman republican elections, with the town's citizens divided into voting curiae and the victors decided by those curiae. Candidates were also regulated by law, excluding those with dishonourable professions or reputations and requiring sureties to be posted for performance of duties. Even as elections for the aedilate at Rome came under the control of the emperors, they continued to be contested at the local level. At Pompeii, for example, there has been discovered graffiti of campaign messages for municipal elections to the municipal aedilate. Other cities that had aediles include Agrigentum in Sicily and Corinth, at the time a Roman colony, in Greece.

These municipal aediles were generally put in charge of similar tasks to those of the republican aediles at Rome: supervising road maintenance, public buildings, public markets, and night watches. Some towns also elected municipal quaestors, generally more junior than the aediles, to assist in these tasks but it is not clear that all towns had such a magistracy. Municipal aediles were also normally inducted into the town's council (curia or ordo decurionum), either by virtue of having held office or by wealth. There are few attested difficulties in filling these municipal offices until the late second century AD, when complaints about the personal expense of holding these offices – which were paid out of the officeholder's pocket – become more common. The municipal office starts to disappear, probably after having been stripped of decision-making powers while retaining a rump notary function, in the fifth century AD.

Not all magistrates by the name "aedile" necessarily had similar duties, however. Cities within the Roman empire may have adopted Roman terms for magistrates but assigned them different duties or simply assigned the name to a preexisting local magistracy. Aediles, for example, appear as moneyers in Saguntum and other Spanish towns in the 1st century BC. Localities with privileged status (such as municipia or colonia) likely reformed their local constitutions to conform with more Roman practices.
