= Quaestio perpetua =

Permanent jury court in the Roman republic

A quaestio perpetua (also judicia publica) was a permanent jury court in the Roman Republic and early Roman Empire. The first was established by the lex Calpurnia de repetundis in 149 BC to try cases on corruption and extortion. More were established in following years to hear cases on various crimes, such as maiestas (treason), ambitus (electoral corruption), peculatus (theft of public funds), and vis (public violence). Unlike the older trials before a popular assembly (termed a iudicium populi), which had to be convoked for that purpose by a sitting magistrate, the courts were always open and any citizen could bring charges.

From the formation of the quaestiones through to the lex Aurelia in 70 BC, the composition of the juries was a topic of constant political struggle. Initially, the juries were made up of senators; after the reforms of Gaius Sempronius Gracchus in 122 BC they were made up of equestrians; after the Sullan reforms they were returned entirely to the senate before the lex Aurelia split the juries into three groups of senators, equites, and tribuni aerarii.

The quaestiones was a core part of Roman public law from their introduction through the late republic. During the imperial period, they gradually fell out of use, with many of their public functions transferred to the senate or other imperial magistrates. By the third century AD, they were obsolete.

== History ==
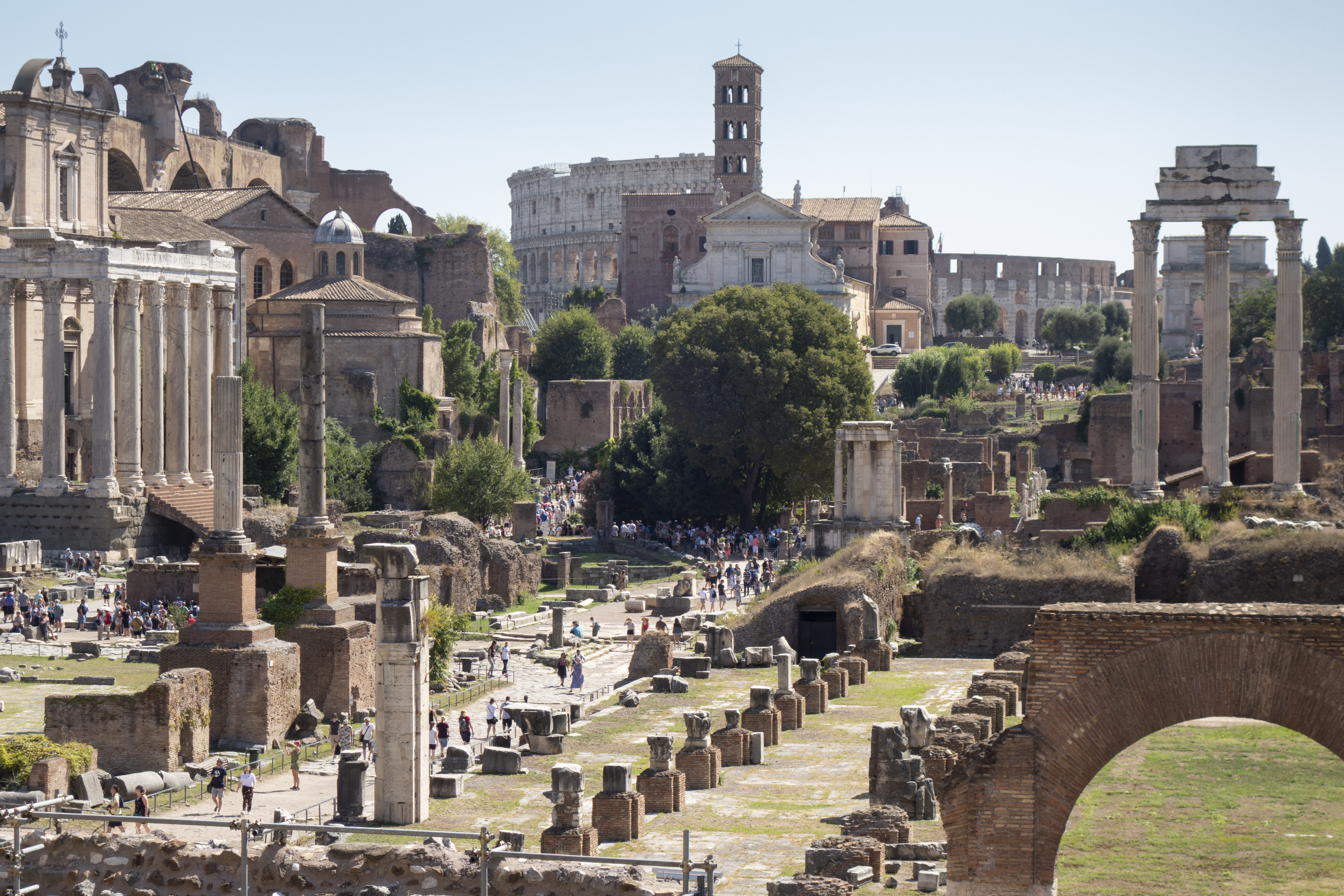
The quaestiones met in the open air in the Forum, the ruins of which are pictured above.

=== Formation ===
The phrase quaestiones perpetuae comes from Cicero, specifically in his history of Roman oratory, titled Brutus. The first permanent jury court in Rome was formed in 149 BC with the passage of the lex Calpurnia de repetundis by the plebeian tribune Lucius Calpurnius Piso Frugi. Some historians believe that the first permanent courts were established earlier (perhaps in 159 BC) or later (with Gaius Gracchus' laws) but this is not supported by Ciceronean evidence. The main innovation of Piso's was to establish a specific type of action and to make it possible at any time to bring charges: unlike with the trials before popular assemblies, which could only be convoked by a sitting magistrate, any citizen in good standing could bring charges that fell within the court's remit at any time.

Prior to this point, any actions had to be brought either before a popular assembly or before an ad hoc tribunal established by law for that purpose. This was cumbersome and the permanent court established by the lex Calpurnia eventually displaced these ad hoc inquests over large portions of the law.

The purpose of this novel court was to allow provincials or Roman citizens resident to prosecute provincial governors who stole or otherwise unlawfully appropriated goods and money from them. One of the main issues in that year was outrage over the corrupt actions of Roman governors in the provinces: for example, there was unsuccessful legislation brought to establish a special tribunal to try Servius Sulpicius Galba, who was governor in Hispania Ulterior the previous year, for treacherously inducing a number of Lusitanian tribes to surrender before massacring them and selling the survivors into slavery. The legislation served "as a warning to men like Galba that the Senate intended to keep a permanent watch on the conduct of governors". However, the immediate impact of the lex Calpurnia was "feeble", as it proceeded to acquit four of five governors charged before it, triggering a series of scandals. Moreover, the original penalty was merely restitution of the stolen goods, without any kind of punitive damages.

Between 123 and 122 BC, Gaius Gracchus was plebeian tribune. Part of his legislative programme included reining in the corruption exactions of provincial governors. To that effect, he expanded the scope of the courts: the provincials were permitted to sue on their own behalf, restitution was raised to double damages to create a penal element, and for particularly heinous cases, the court could deliver a sentence of exile. Moreover, the jury pool was transferred from senators to equestrians, which was probably an attempt both to insulate the court from the influence of the senators (who might not want to act against their peers) and to reduce the senate's standing by showing a lack of confidence in their good faith.

=== Expansion ===
During and after the 120s BC, further permanent courts were created: there was a court inter sicarios to prosecute professional killers, a court de veneficiis on poisonings, and a court de ambitus on electoral corruption. A further court was established during Sullan times to punish counterfeiting and forged wills with exile. It is not entirely clear whether these courts were also affected by the Gracchan reforms to the jury pools, but by 81 BC it is clear that the quaestio de repetundis no longer stood alone. However, the piecemeal proliferation of various different courts hearing different kinds of cases contributed to a sense of illogic: court jurisdictions were expanded by grouping vaguely similar charges so that a prosecutor would not have to bring cases in multiple courts simultaneously.

During one of the tribunates of Lucius Appuleius Saturninus, in either 103 or 101–100 BC, he passed legislation establishing a permanent court on maiestas cases. Maiestas was an abbreviation for the longer phrase maiestas populi Romani minuta (diminishing the majesty of the Roman people) and is normally translated as referring to treason.

The permanent court on poisonings had been formed by 98 BC and likely is older, having emerged from a moral panic some time in the second century about wives disposing of their aristocratic husbands. It is likely that after a series of ad hoc tribunals, it was decided that it would be easier to have a permanent court to avoid such procedural nuisances.

The court inter sicarios was not a murder court: Duncan Cloud, in the second edition of the Cambridge Ancient History writes, "it is important not to translate quaestio de sicariis as 'murder-court'... sicarius does not mean murder but a professional killer". Under Sulla's laws, it amalgamated with the court on poisonings, and in general dealt with citizens who were armed with the intention of committing crimes such a murder, theft, or arson. Metaphorically, as false convictions resulted in a citizen's judicial or political (though not actual) death by exile, these also came into the court inter sicarios's jurisdiction. Because this also included crimes that non-senators could in fact commit – non-senators were definitionally not the kind of people who, as governor, could steal from provincial communities – this court's president was normally an ex-aedile rather than a praetor – an expedient taken when the number of courts exceeded the number of praetors elected that year – giving it lower status.

Legislation in 78 BC, the lex Lutatia brought by Quintus Lutatius Catulus Capitolinus, established a court de vi (public violence) in 78 BC. This court was meant to prosecute a number of crimes relating to political violence. This included intimidating or breaking up meetings of the senate by force, attacking magistrates, or disrupting the courts; other violent offences also were included, such as carrying offensive weapons in public, retaining gladiators to commit arson or murder, and stockpiling weapons. The purpose of the law was to tame the rise in political violence in the late republic; it was also clearly unsuccessful.

There were three later courts established: one to handle disputes over citizenship created by the lex Papia in 65 BC, one to handle kidnappings created by the lex Fabia de plagiariis some time before 63 BC, and one for kinslaying in consequence of a lex de parricidiis in 55 BC. By the end of the republic and the early Principate, Tacitus reports some sixteen different quaestiones perpetuae operating in Rome.

=== Decline ===
The quaestiones survived the fall of the republic into the early Principate. Through to the emperor Caligula, various changes were made to the jury pools (usually expanding them); Augustus introduced a new court for adultery and his work on the courts signalled his confidence. But by the third century AD, the quaestiones were obsolete, with their jurisdiction being transferred in the city to the hands of the praefectus urbi and the praefectus praetorio. Matters of state, such as treason, were likewise transferred to a compliant senate, which began in the imperial period to take on judicial responsibilities. Through the imperial period, the system of jury trials gave way to inquisitorial investigation by a magistrate, known as a cognitio under various magistrates.

== Procedure ==
At the beginning, with Piso's lex Calpurnia and the quaestio de repetundis, only Roman citizens could prosecute, which disadvantaged non-Roman provincials. However, it is likely that Roman citizens were assigned to represent non-Romans in court proceedings at Rome in the role of patron. One of the reforms of Gaius Gracchus was to eliminate this requirement, giving standing to provincials directly.

Each court was presided over by a president, usually a praetor, who heard the charges and then moved to a full trial. Because each quaestio was constituted by a different statute, there was generally no consistent form of action nor consistent composition of juries. In general, there were no appeals to the people or otherwise from the relevant quaestio; Mark Antony proposed adding such an appeal some time in 44 BC, but it was never implemented.

Under the Gracchan procedures in the court de repetundis, a praetor assembled at the start of the year an album of 450 jurors from the equestrian order who were not related to any senators and had not served in any magistracy. Of these, 50 were selected for a case, which was initiated by bringing a complaint before the presiding praetor. A simple majority sufficed for conviction. If convicted, the court assessed damages owed and gave double that to the prosecutor. Successful prosecutors also were given Roman citizenship or otherwise provocatio rights and freedom from military service.

The expanded set of courts were meant for repression of crime, both those related to state activities and more generally, but were largely unsuccessful as law enforcement vehicles, largely for reasons related to procedure. Prosecutions before the permanent courts were all private; there was no state prosecutor. Only minimal assistance was provided and only those with a strong incentive would be willing to prosecute. This meant that popular criminals regularly evaded prosecution altogether. Moreover, defendants were often acquitted: prosecutors were seen as pursuing vendettas, defendants invited eminent and eloquent friends to defend them in court.

Rules of evidence did not exist. This at times helped reach fairer outcomes but more regularly allowed skilled orators to "arouse irrelevant prejudice": Cicero, for example, "pulled the wool over the eyes of the jury in his defence of Cluentius" in part by insinuating that the prosecutrix was a murderer and hated her son for unnatural reasons. Moreover, the proliferation of courts hearing different kinds of actions was clumsy and inconvenient; this was not helped by the formulaic system of fixed penalties that drove juries to pick between the two extremes of exile and acquittal.

== Jury composition ==
Timeline of changes to jury compositions. Red represents the senate; blue represents the equites; purple represents a mixed panel (inclusive or not of the tribuni aerarii); orange represents the tribally-based juries. After 49 BC and the start of Caesar's civil war, jury trials became largely irrelevant compared to the power of the dynasts.

The beginning of each year, the praetor would assemble a list of available and qualified jurors into an album. At various times, the jury pool was taken from the senatorial order, the equestrian order, both, and a mixture of the two with a third group. The question of who made up the jury pool for the courts and what cases the courts ought to hear was the topic of substantial debate during the late republic; this was itself driven by politicisation of prosecutions within the senatorial elite and the tension between senatorial governors and equestrian tax farmers in the provinces.

At the start, in 149 BC, the juries were taken from the senators. After Gaius Gracchus' reforms, this transferred to a large non-senatorial jury, made up largely of equestrians. It was changed again in 106 BC by Quintus Servilius Caepio to a mixture of both senators and equites but this was reverted a few years later by Gaius Servilius Glaucia. Marcus Livius Drusus attempted to staff the courts with an enlarged senate – or possibly attempted to mix senators and equestrians, Appian, who describes the plan to enlarge the senate, may be confused – but was assassinated amid the start of the Social War. A few years later, the plebeian tribune Marcus Plautius Silvanus introduced jury pools selected by each tribe in 89 BC but all these changes were reverted by Sulla during his dictatorship. Sulla implemented Drusus' plan, enlarging the senate and transferring the jury pool to this enlarged senate.

Cicero's Verrines contain a number of bombastic claims of through-going corruption among the senatorial juries, but may be largely exaggerated for rhetorical effect; they also exaggerate the importance of judicial reform in Roman politics of the time, which was a peripheral issue when viewed holistically. The senate circa 70 BC felt it was safe to engage in reforms – which included the jury pools but was focused most especially on the restoration of tribunician privileges – that culminated in the praetor Lucius Aurelius Cotta bringing the lex Aurelia in 70 BC, which largely settled this matter of jury compositions. Under his lex Aurelia, there were three pools (decuriae): senators, equites, and the tribuni aerarii. Who the tribuni aerarii were is unclear. Various theories have been proposed: many scholars believe that they were members of the first class, others suggest equestrians without the public horse, or merely selected equestrians with that title. The jury in a trial had a third of its jury chosen by lot from each decuria; the prosecution and defendant also had a limited right to reject jurors.

During Caesar's rule in 46 BC, the decuria of the tribuni aerarii was abolished. Many scholars have interpreted this act, consistent with descriptions from Dio, to have removed the poorer first class from the juries, leaving only the extremely wealthy senators and equestrians. That decuria was revived during the reign of Augustus and a further panel of poorer jurors was also added for minor cases.
