= Laterculus =

A laterculus was, in late antiquity or the early medieval period, an inscribed tile, stone or terracotta tablet used for publishing certain kinds of information in list or calendar form. The term thus came to be used for the content represented by such an inscription, most often a list, register, or table, regardless of the medium in which it was published. A list of soldiers in a Roman military unit, such as of those recruited or discharged in a given year, may be called a laterculus, an example of which is found in an inscription from Vindonissa. The equivalent Greek term is plinthos (πλίνθος; see plinth for the architectural use).

A common type of laterculus was the computus, a table that calculates the date of Easter, and so laterculus will often be equivalent to fasti. Isidore of Seville said that a calendar cycle should be called a laterculus "because it has the years put in order by rows," that is, in a table.

== List of laterculi ==
Notable laterculi include:

- Laterculus Veronensis, a list of Roman provinces from the times of the Roman emperors Diocletian and Constantine I.
- Laterculus Malalianus, a late 7th-century historical exegesis of the life of Christ from the Chronica Minora in the Monumenta Germaniae Historica, drawing from the Chronographia of John Malalas and so called by Theodor Mommsen, though only a relatively small part of the text takes the form of a list (covering Roman emperors from Augustus to Justin II).
- Laterculus regum Vandalorum et Alanorum, a list of Vandal kings based in Mommsen's view on diplomas or, alternatively, largely on an African version of the Chronicle of Prosper Tiro.
- Laterculus regum Visigothorum, list of Visigothic kings.
- Laterculus Polemii Silvii, an Imperial Roman list of emperors and provinces by Polemius Silvius.
