= Ovile =

Area for voting in Ancient Rome

The Ovile (Latin, "sheep fold") was an enclosed area of the Campus Martius in Ancient Rome, used for voting. The name came from its resemblance to sheep pens. It was sometimes referred to as the Saepta (Latin, "enclosure"). It was a wooden structure and was replaced by the larger and more ornate marble Saepta Julia after the civil wars of 49–30 BC. This later building, commissioned by Julius Caesar, was possibly sited in the same area as the original Ovile.
