= Porticus Argonautarum =

Ancient structure in Rome

The Porticus Argonautarum (Latin for the "Portico of the Argonauts"; Italian: Portico degli Argonauti), also known as the Portico of Agrippa (Latin: Porticus Agrippae or Agrippiana) was a portico in ancient Rome.

The building was located in the Saepta Julia, a large square in the Campus Martius used for public comitia (assemblies). The square, a large free space surrounded by porticoes, was finished by Marcus Vipsanius Agrippa, admiral and friend of emperor Augustus, in 27 BC. The portico of the Argonauts was added in 25 BC, to commemorate Agrippa's naval victories in 31 BC: it took its name from its decorations, which depicted the mythological expedition of Jason.

Studies of the Forma Urbis (an ancient detailed plan of Rome) have located the portico in what is now Via della Minerva, near the basilica of Santa Maria sopra Minerva.

A brickwork wall preserved along the eastern side of the Pantheon has been assigned to the Porticus Argonautarum.
