= Constitutional reforms of Sulla =

Roman laws (82–80 BCE)

The constitutional reforms of Sulla were a series of laws enacted by Lucius Cornelius Sulla (the Roman dictator) between 82 and 80 BC, reforming the constitution of the Roman Republic in a revolutionary way. In the decades before Sulla had become dictator, Roman politics became increasingly violent. Shortly before Sulla's first consulship, the Romans fought the bloody Social War against their Italian allies, victorious mostly due to their immediate concession on the Italians' war goal of gaining Roman citizenship. Sulla's dictatorship followed more domestic unrest after the war and was a culmination in this trend for violence, with his leading an army on Rome for the second time in a decade and purging his opponents from the body politic in bloody proscriptions.

In the aftermath of Sulla's civil war and a decade of internecine conflict following the Social War, the republic had collapsed. Sulla attempted to resolve this crisis by embarking on a large reform programme inaugurating what he saw as a "new republic" empowering magistrates while holding them accountable to law enforced by permanent courts (with a larger senate to provide juries for those courts).

His constitution would be mostly rescinded by two of his former lieutenants, Pompey and Crassus, less than ten years after his death. The mechanisms for accountability inherent to his reforms proved unworkable. Sulla's marches on Rome also had proved that accountability was impossible to impose on a general with a sufficiently large army. Moreover, Romans were unable to accept as legitimate a set of reforms given by a self-appointed lawgiver under the threat of violence.

== Background ==
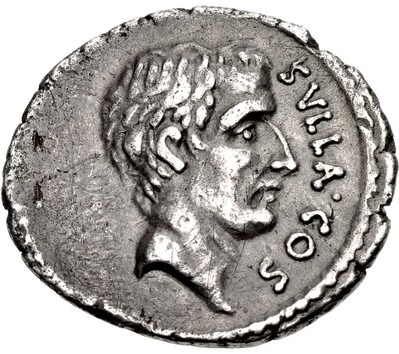
A portrait of Sulla, on a denarius of 54 BC, minted by his grandson.

Over the period from the violent death of Tiberius Gracchus in 133, Roman republican politics were becoming increasingly violent and discordant; at various times, force was used against political opponents to suppress political opposition. Shortly before Sulla's first consulship in 88, the Romans fought the bloody Social War against their Italian allies, victorious mostly due to their immediate concession on the Italians' main war goal of gaining Roman citizenship. During his consulship in 88, Sulla had marched his army on Rome as consul and deposed Publius Sulpicius Rufus (the plebeian tribune) by force after Sulpicius induced the Assembly to reassign Sulla's command in the First Mithridatic War to Gaius Marius. The cause of Sulla's first march on Rome was a secondary issue in the politics of the day: Sulpicius had brought the bill to reassign the Mithridatic command to curry favour with Marius to support granting the Italians full citizenship rights in the aftermath of the Social War. After marching on the city, Sulla drove a number of politicians, including Marius, into exile under threat of death and left for the east to fight Mithridates.

In his absence, Sulla and his supporters lost control of Rome, with Marius' return and election with Lucius Cornelius Cinna to the consulship. Marius died mere months into their joint consulship, but Cinna survived for four years (before being murdered by his troops), dominating Roman politics, killing his enemies, and, among other things, driving Sulla's family to flee for safety in the east. Conventional republican government had collapsed after 88, and Sulla's civil war – triggered by his return from the east at the head of an army – was fought between "a rogue regime in the city and a rogue general Sulla, who intended to set up a new republic along very different lines". Already during the civil war, Sulla and others were discussing constitutional reform. In the event, Sulla was victorious over his enemies, and induced the passage of the lex Valeria creating him dictator legibus scribundis et rei publicae constituendae, meaning he was a dictator for the writing of laws and the regulation of the republic.

== Sulla's constitution ==
Many newer studies from 1971 onwards "support the interpretation of [Sulla's] reform programme as a new republic rather than a restoration". The reforms "were dressed up as a return to traditional Roman practice [but] many were nothing of the sort"; "Sulla was definitely not trying to 'turn back the clock', let alone to any particular period in Roman history".

The rigidly legalised constitution, based on a system of laws enforced by senatorial courts, that Sulla put forward "did not correspond to the Roman experience of a traditional republic... based on deliberation in the senate, debate in front of the people, and on elaborate rituals of compromise and consensus building in both settings". It was also not an ideologically consistent set of reforms, acting ad hoc to address various different issues identified in the state.

=== Senate and the assembly ===
Sulla expanded the number of senators from some three hundred (before the civil war) to as many as six hundred, more than doubling its size, with new senators recruited from the ranks of the equites and the nobles of Italian towns. Before his expansion, the senate's ranks were skeletally thin: of former consuls, a mere five were known to be alive and able to participate in 82. He also increased the number of quaestores elected per year from eight to twenty and made induction to the senate automatic with the holding of the quaestorship; this meant that many of the new senators would likely never hold higher office and existed rather to serve as jurors in a large system of permanent jury courts. There would be at least seven courts, each under a praetor, with large juries to minimise the impact of bribery. In the past, from the time of the Gracchi onwards, these courts had been staffed by the equestrians, but now the juries would be picked from members of the senatorial class.

The consequences of Sulla's changes to the senate resulted in a "two-tiered... system in which the inner circle of the powerful opinion makers... were separated from those who spent their lives as jurors". The leading senators holding magistracies also were to spend their year in office in the capital rather than commanding troops abroad, making senate debates far more formal and providing an environment in which the consuls could repeatedly clash. The office of praetor also changed, put in charge of the courts during their magistracy before being sent to govern a province immediately afterwards. In the past, the senate had been composed of people recognised by the censors for their achievements in high office or of personal virtue; Sulla's lacked this, being composed mainly of his supporters and the winners of relatively undiscriminating elections to the quaestorship.

Sulla also, according to Appian, required that laws be brought before the centuries rather than the tribes and that they first receive the approval of the senate. The requirement to bring laws before the centuries does not seem to have survived even Sulla's dictatorship, as he brought a law on the quaestorship before the tribes. Sulla settled instead on divesting the tribunes of their legislative initiative and allowing curule magistrates to call the tribes to hear legislative proposals. Consular legislation was rare before the Sulla's reforms, with most legislation being put by tribunes, but after Sulla, it became common to have consuls and praetors introduce bills before the people.

=== Magistracies ===
Sulla made the traditional order in which offices were held (Latin: cursus honorum, lit. 'course of honours') a legal requirement (e.g. to be elected consul, one had to have been praetor) and required a ten-year period between re-election to office with minimum ages to various offices. Among his other changes to elections, he neutered the plebeian tribunes, turning the office into a dead-end position with little power: their ability to veto public business was removed along with powers to propose legislation. Moreover, anyone elected to the tribunate was thence ineligible to future elected office. Their powers were reduced only to protecting citizens from a magistrate's arbitrary actions.

The effects of these changes to the magistracies was profound. Citizens no longer would have tribunes call meetings, give political speeches, or vote on tribunician legislation; however, the process of electing magistrates had little changed, with politicians still campaigning before the people. While the people had not lost their sovereign power to make laws, they instead "were simply called upon to ratify laws that had already been approved by the senate and that were proposed by the highest magistrates". Limits also were placed on the discretion of governors in the field. Instead of appointing them to wage a campaign of some sort, Sulla required them to go to a province, defined as specific geographic area, and then stay there without deviating from instructions provided by the senate until relieved. The penalties for breaking these laws (cf Caesar) were also severe.

=== Other ===
In the realm of religion, Sulla repealed the lex Domitia de sacerdotiis of 104, which placed the election of priests into the hands of the people, returning to the older system of co-option. The Temple of Jupiter Optimus Maximus on the Capitoline hill, which had burnt down in 83, was rebuilt, named after a close ally of Sulla's, Quintus Lutatius Catulus. He also abolished the grain dole and Roman state's subsidies to control food prices in the city. He also, as dictator, expanded Rome's sacred city boundary, the pomerium.

== Fate of the Sullan constitution ==
Sulla resigned from his dictatorship at the end of 81 and promptly took office as consul for 80. Conceiving "of his dictatorship in quasi-republican terms, as a special office undertaken to ... [establish] a constitutional (republican) form of government" and imagining himself as a lawgiver, he became ordinary consul in the first year of his new republic. After his consulship, he retired and died in 78, with his funeral held in Rome at public expense, to the dismay of one of the then-consuls, Marcus Aemilius Lepidus.

=== Reforms to the tribunes and courts ===
His republic would prove to be a failure as "the content, style, and origins of Sulla's new republic were too revolutionary and too foreign to last in Rome" after his demise. The role of the senatorial juries in holding magistrates and governors accountable was undermined by Sulla's own example in being entirely immune from accountability by successfully marching on Rome. In the year of his death, proposals were already being made to overturn Sulla's limitations on the popular tribunes. This extended to Sulla's grain dole reforms: co-consul Lepidus carried a bill without opposition reintroducing or expanding the dole. Later in that year, Lepidus raised an army against the senate and his colleague in response to obstruction against his political reforms. Sulla required the consuls to conduct affairs in the city; within two years, disagreements between the consuls had started another civil war.

A few years later in 75, one of the consuls, Gaius Aurelius Cotta, lifted the bar on tribunes holding future office, to much acclaim from the people. Sulla's removal of the grain dole also increased tensions in Rome, with the consuls being attacked on the via Sacra over the price of grain. The next year, Lucius Quinctius, then-tribune of the plebs, agitated in the Forum to restore tribunician rights. Sulla's reforms to the grain dole were further abrogated in 73, with the consuls carrying a law authorising further grain purchases from Sicily while popular agitation for tribunician rights continued. Just eight years after his death, his lieutenants during the civil war, Pompey and Crassus in their consulships for 70, restored the plebeian tribunes to their historic powers and oversaw the reintroduction of elections to the censorship. The power to legislate was quickly seized again: a lex Plautia was passed in the same year granting a pardon to supporters of Lepidus' revolt in 78.

The consulship of Pompey and Crassus in 70 was not a coherent attack on Sulla's legacy. Other portions of his reforms remained (co-option to the priestly colleges remained until 63) and the consuls did not actively support the bill to change the composition of the permanent court juries. The changed number of magistrates also persisted, as did Sulla's laws on treason and Sulla's stripping of civil rights from the descendants of proscribed persons (those civil disabilities would only be lifted under Caesar's rule in 49).

Major elements in the failure of republic as it had existed before Sulla's first consulship were the use of political violence and the ineffectiveness of the Roman elite to manage external threats. The civil war itself also did not end with the start of Sulla's new republic with his consulship in 80: various holdouts continued to resist Sulla's government, both in Spain and in Italy. With the Third Servile War against Spartacus' slave revolt and the renewed threat from Mithridates, who Sulla had not defeated in the east, "[t]he feeling that the new republic was a failure was hard to escape". These issues were compounded by political unrest at the consular elections every year between 66 and 62 and the greater level of corruption engendered by Sulla's neutering of the traditional republican mechanisms of overseeing magistrates and governors.

=== Longer term effects ===
Sulla's changes also had longer term effects by permanently altering the makeup of the senate. The permanently larger senate guaranteed from the intake of the twenty annual quaestors reached a size of around 600. The nature of the senate in Sulla's regime also made it difficult for Sulla's system of law courts to function:

It was composed of two groups with interchangeable membership and conflicting ambitions: those who policed the actions of the [republic's] agents through the courts, and those who acted for the res publica as magistrates. Such a system of oversight could only work effectively if the two groups remained separate, but there was continual traffic between the two groups, as men stood for office, were elected as magistrates, and then returned to the status of private individuals.

The larger size of the senate after Sulla's reforms, along with the increased number of imperium-possessing magistrates in the city, made the body dysfunctional, difficult to influence, and unpredictable. Moreover, its larger size,

[prevented the senate from being] a venue for serious political debate. An increase in the membership also fatally undermined the prestige of a body that had until then been far more exclusive. [Sulla's design was one] in which centre stage is taken up by elected, imperium-holding magistrates, who are in turn bound to the respect of a set of laws. Far from being the champion of senatorial auctoritas [influence], Sulla took decisive steps for [its] political marginalization[.]

Sulla's interruption in the regular election of censors and the censuses which they conducted also persisted: after the census authorised during the consulship of Pompey and Crassus in 70, the next completed census would have to wait until 28 BC, when it was conducted by Augustus and Marcus Agrippa amid Augustus' establishment of one man rule.

== See also ==
- Constitution of the Roman Republic
- Sulla's civil war
