= Valerian and Porcian laws =

Roman Republic precursors to bills of rights

The Valerian and Porcian laws (Latin: Leges Valeriae Publicolae, Leges Porciae) were Roman laws passed between 509 BC and 184 BC. They exempted Roman citizens from degrading and shameful forms of punishment, such as whipping, scourging, or crucifixion. They also established certain rights for Roman citizens, including provocatio, the right to appeal to the tribunes of the plebs. The Valerian law also made it legal to kill any citizen who was plotting to establish a tyranny. This clause was used several times, the most important of which was its usage by Julius Caesar's assassins.

== Valerian law ==
The first Valerian law was enacted by Publius Valerius Publicola in 509 BC, a few years after the founding of republican Rome. It allowed a Roman citizen, condemned by a magistrate to death or scourging, the right of appeal to the people (provocatio ad populum), that is, to the people composed of senators, patricians, and plebeians. Thus the consuls no longer had the power of pronouncing sentence in capital cases against a Roman citizen, without the consent of the people. The Valerian law consequently divested the consuls of the power to punish crimes, thereby abolishing the vestiges within the Roman government of that unmitigated power that was the prerogative of the Tarquin kings.

Nonetheless, the Valerian law was not kept on the books throughout the five hundred years of the Roman republic. Indeed, Titus Livius (Livy) states that the Valerian law was enacted again, for the third time, in 299 BC. Andrew Lintott surmises that the effect of this third Valerian law was to regularize the provocatio: appeals from the people via the Tribune of the Plebs had been a fact of life with which magistrates had to deal prior to the law, but now magistrates were ordered to yield to the decisions of the people in capital cases. Livy notes that in all three cases the law was enacted by the Valerius family. Furthermore, Livy notes that, should a magistrate disregard the Valerian law, his only reproof was that his act be deemed unlawful and wicked. This implies that the Valerian law was not so very effective in defending the plebs.

== Porcian laws ==
The Porcian laws (Latin: Leges Porciae) were three Roman laws broadening the rights of the Valerian law. They were enacted by members of the Gens Porcia in the 2nd century BC. We do not know their precise dates, but they seem to have ended summary execution of Roman citizens in the field and provinces and provided that citizens could escape sentences of death by voluntary exile. Cicero in the Republic (2.54) refers to three leges Porciae, but is not clear on their specific details.

- Lex Porcia I (Lex Porcia): perhaps proposed by the tribune of the plebs P. Porcius Laeca in 199 BC, it extended the right to provocatio to a further 1000 steps outside of Rome, to Roman citizens in the provinces, and to Roman soldiers. Up to this time, it is probable that provincial authorities had unmitigated coercitio.
- Lex Porcia II (Lex Porcia de tergo civium): perhaps proposed by M. Porcius Cato (Cato the Elder), consul in 195 BC and 184 BC, it extended the right to provocatio against flogging.
- Lex Porcia III: perhaps proposed by M. Porcius Cato (Cato the Elder), or a L. Porcius Licinius, it provided for a very severe sanction (possibly death) against magistrates who refused to grant provocatio.

The Porcian Laws do not seem to have fully protected citizen soldiers from centurions' vine staffs, as Tacitus mentions severe beatings continuing to be inflicted under the principate.

== Other laws ==
Another law that was passed with the intention of protecting citizens from severe punishment at the hands of governors and magistrates, is the lex Julia de vi publica, passed around 50 BC. It was passed to define rape as forced sex against "boy, woman, or anyone" and the rapist was subject to execution. Men who had been raped were exempt from the loss of legal or social standing suffered by those who submitted their bodies to use for the pleasure of others; a male prostitute or entertainer was infamis and excluded from the legal protections extended to citizens in good standing. As a matter of law, a slave could not be raped; he was considered property and not legally a person. The slave's owner, however, could prosecute the rapist for property damage. Yet this law, for all practical purposes, is only a restatement of the right of appeal present in the Valerian and Porcian laws.

== Violation ==
This sanctity of a citizen's person was highly esteemed by the Romans, and so any violation of the Valerian and Porcian laws was deemed to be almost a sacrilege. Cicero’s oration in his prosecution of Verres indicates the high pitch to which this feeling was carried. Verres, who as the governor of Sicily (73–70 BC) had a number of Roman citizens cruelly killed, was eventually tried before the senators in Rome, on charges of extortion (Cic. Ver. 5.161-2).

== See also ==
- Roman law
- List of Roman laws
