= List of Roman laws =

This is a partial list of Roman laws. A Roman law (Latin: lex) is usually named for the sponsoring legislator and designated by the adjectival form of his gens name (nomen gentilicum), in the feminine form because the noun lex (plural leges) is of feminine grammatical gender. When a law is the initiative of the two consuls, it is given the name of both, with the nomen of the senior consul first. Sometimes a law is further specified by a short phrase describing the content of the law, to distinguish that law from others sponsored by members of the same gens.

== Roman Laws ==
Name	Date	Passed by	Magistracy held	Description
Lex Regia	759–509 BC		Kings of Rome	Laws enacted by the Roman kings before the Republic.
Lex Valeria	509, 449, & 300 BC	P. Valerius Publicola	Consul	Granted every Roman citizen legal right to appeal against a capital sentence, defined and confirmed the right of appeal (provocatio).
Lex Sacrata	494 BC			law after first secession of the plebeians that either affirmed the sacrosanctity of the tribunes or established the plebeians as a sworn confederacy against patricians.
Lex Publilia	471 BC	Volero Publilius	Tribune of the plebs	Transferred the election of the tribunes of the plebs to the comitia tributa.
Lex Icilia de Aventino publicando	456 BC	L. Icilius	Tribune of the plebs	Gave land to plebeians.
Lex Aternia Tarpeia	454 BC	A. Aternius Varus & S. Tarpeius Montanus Capitolinus	Consuls	Allowed magistrates to fine citizens, but set maximum fines.
Lex Menenia Sestia	452 BC	T. Menenius Lanatus & P. Sestius Capitolinus Vaticanus	Consuls	Scale for fines, 1 ox = 12 sheep = 100 lb. of bronze.
Lex Valeria Horatia	449 BC	L. Valerius Potitus & M. Horatius Barbatus	Consuls	Three laws: (1) Lex Valeria Horatia de plebiscitis: established that the resolutions passed by the Plebeian Council were binding on all. (2) Lex Valeria Horatia de provocatione: granted the right to appeal to the People of any decision of magistrates. (3) Lex Valeria Horatia de tribunicia potestate: restored the potestas tribunicia, the powers of the plebeian tribunes.
Lex Trebonia	448 BC	L. Trebonius	Tribune of the plebs	Forbade the cooptation of additional tribunes of the plebs to fill vacant positions.
Lex Canuleia	445 BC	C. Canuleius	Tribune of the plebs	Allowed patricians and plebeians to intermarry.
Lex Aemilia de censoribus	434 BC	Mam. Aemilius Mamercinus	Dictator	Reduced the terms of censors to a year and a half.
Lex Papiria Julia	430 BC	L. Papirius Crassus & L. Julius Iulus	Consuls	Made payment of fines in bronze mandatory.
Lex Licinia Sextia	367 BC	C. Licinius Stolo & L. Sextius Lateranus	Tribunes of the plebs	Four laws: (1) Lex de consule altero ex plebe et de praetore ex patribus creando: resumed the consulship and opened it to plebeians, and created the praetorship, reserved to patricians. (2) Lex de aere alieno: provided that the interest already paid on debts should be deducted from the principal and that the payment of the rest of the principal should be in three equal annual instalments. (3) Lex de modo agrorum: restricted individual ownership of public land in excess of 500 iugeras (300 acres) and forbade the grazing of more than 100 cattle on public land. (4) Lex de Decemviri Sacris Faciundis: created the Decemviri sacris faciundis, a college of ten priests, of whom five had to be plebeians.
Lex Genucia	342 BC	L. Genucius	Tribune of the plebs	Three laws: (1) Abolished interest on loans. (2) Required the election of at least one plebeian consul each year. (3) Prohibited a magistrate from holding two magistracies in the same year, or the same magistracy for the next ten years (until 332).
Lex Publilia	339 BC	Q. Publilius Philo	Consul and dictator	Three laws: (1) Reserved one censorship to plebeians. (2) Made plebiscites binding on all citizens (including patricians). (3) Stated that the Senate had to give its prior approval (the Auctoritas patrum) to plebiscites before becoming binding on all citizens (the lex Valeria Horatia of 449 had placed this approval after plebiscites).
Lex Poetelia Papiria	326 BC	C. Poetelius Libo & L. Papirius Cursor	Consuls	Abolished the contractual form of Nexum, or debt bondage.
Lex Ovinia	312 BC (before)	Ovinius	Tribune of the plebs	Transferred the right to appoint Senators from the consuls to the censors.
Lex Atilia Marcia	311 BC	L. Atilius & C. Marcius Rutilus Censorinus	Tribunes of the plebs	Empowered the people to elect sixteen military tribunes for each of four legions.
Lex Ogulnia	300 BC	Cn. & Q. Ogulnius	Tribune of the plebs	Created four plebeian pontiffs and five plebeian augurs.
Lex Hortensia	287 BC	Q. Hortensius	Dictator	Plebiscites approved by the Assembly of the People gain the status of law.
Lex Aquilia de damno	286 BC (possibly)	Aquilius	Tribune of the plebs	Provided compensation to the owners of property injured by someone's fault.
Lex Maenia	279 BC	Maenius	Tribune of the plebs	Carried the principle of lex Pubilia to elections (approval of Senate moved before the elections, not after).
Lex Luci Lucerina	314-100 BC			Prohibited the dumping of waste at a specific locale by Luceria.
Lex Luci Spoletina	Shortly after 241 BC			Prohibited the cutting of trees or removal of timber at a nearby sacred grove. It also outlined the punishments for those who violated the law.
Lex Hieronica	240 BC	Hiero II	King of Sicily	Taxation of Sicily (the legislation of Hiero II was included in Roman law).
Lex Claudia de nave senatoris	218 BC	Q. Claudius	Tribune of the plebs	Prohibited senators from participating in overseas trade, obsolete by the time of Cicero.
Lex Minucia	216 BC	M. Minucius	Tribune of the plebs	Appointment of three finance commissioners.
Lex Oppia	215 BC	C. Oppius	Tribune of the plebs	Limited female adornment.
Lex Cincia de donis et muneribus	204 BC	M. Cincius Alimentus	Tribune of the plebs	Tort reform concerning the payment of lawyers.
Lex Porcia	199 BC	P. Porcius Laeca	Tribune of the plebs	Gave right of appeal (provocatio) in capital cases.
Lex Porcia de tergo civium	195 BC	Cato the Elder	Consul	Extended the right to provocatio against flogging.
Lex Acilia de intercalando	191 BC	M'. Acilius Glabrio	Consul	Adjustment of the calendar, then roughly four months off its Julian equivalent.
Lex Porcia	185 BC	L. Porcius Licinus	Consul	Provided for a very severe sanction (possibly death) against magistrates who refused to grant provocatio.
Lex Baebia de Praetoribus	181 BC	M. Baebius Tamphilus	Consul	Set number of praetors to alternate, but was never observed.
Lex Cornelia et Baebia de Ambitu	181 BC	P. Cornelius Cethegus & M. Baebius Tamphilus	Consuls	Against electoral bribery.
Lex Villia Annalis	180 BC	L. Villius Annalis	Tribune of the plebs	Established minimum ages for the cursus honorum offices; determined an interval of two years between offices.
Lex Claudia de sociis	177 BC	C. Claudius Pulcher	Consul	Limited immigration of Latin allies to Rome.
Lex Voconia	169 BC	Q. Voconius Saxa	Tribune of the plebs	Disallowed women from being the main heir to a dead man's estate, including cases where there were no male relatives alive.
Lex Papiria de dedicationibus	166—155 BC	Papirius	Tribune of the plebs	Forbade consecration of real property without approval of the popular assembly.
Lex Vallia de manus iniectione	160 BC (circa?)	(Gaius) Vallius	Tribune of the plebs	Modification or extension of legis actiones.
Lex Aelia et Fufia	150 BC (circa?)	Aelius & Fufius	Tribunes of the plebs?	Two laws probably regulating auspices.
Lex Atinia de tribunis plebis in senatum legendis	149 BC	Atinius	Tribune of the plebs	Allowed Plebeian Tribunes to be automatically enrolled in the senate upon election.
Lex Atinia de usucapione	149 BC	Atinius	Tribune of the plebs	Dealing with ownership.
Lex Calpurnia de repetundis	149 BC	L. Calpurnius Piso	Tribune of the plebs	Established a permanent extortion court.
Lex Scantinia	149 BC (circa)	M. Scantius or Scantinius	Tribune of the plebs	Regulating some aspects of homosexual behaviour among citizens, primarily protecting freeborn male minors.
Lex provincia	146 BC			Set of laws designed to regulate and organize the administration of Roman provinces.
Lex Gabinia tabellaria	139 BC	A. Gabinius	Tribune of the plebs	Introduced secret votes in election for magistrate offices.
Lex Cassia tabellaria	137 BC	L. Cassius Longinus Ravilla	Tribune of the plebs	Introduced secret votes in court jury decisions.
Lex Sempronia agraria	133 BC	Ti. Sempronius Gracchus	Tribune of the plebs	Set of laws that redistributed land among the poor; repealed after his assassination.
Lex Aufeia	123 BC	Aufeius	Tribune of the plebs	Settlement of Asia.
Lex Acilia repetundarum	122 BC	M. Acilius Glabrio (& C. Sempronius Gracchus)	Tribunes of the plebs	Repetundae procedures for jurors in courts overseeing senatorial class to prevent corruption abroad.
Lex Rubria	122 BC	C. Rubrius	Tribune of the plebs	Authorised a colony on the ruins of Carthage.
Lex Aebutia de formulis	120–63 BC (circa)	Aebutius	Tribune of the plebs (?)	Authorized praetor's discretion to be introduced into the court of the praetor urbanus, praetor able to remodel private law of Rome.
Lex Aebutia de magistratibus extraordinariis	120–63 BC (circa)	Aebutius	Tribune of the plebs?	Proposer of extraordinary magistracy cannot hold it.
Lex Servilia Caepio	106 BC	Q. Servilius Caepio	Consul	Some control of the court de rebus repentundis was handed back to senators from the equites.
Lex Cassia de senatu	104 BC	L. Cassius Longinus	Tribune of the plebs	Required any senator to be expelled from the senate if they had been convicted of a crime, or if their power (imperium) had been revoked while serving as a magistrate.
Lex Domitia de sacerdotis	104 BC	Cn. Domitius Ahenobarbus	Tribune of the plebs	Established the election of the pontifex maximus and the members of the college of priests (chosen by cooptation before).
Lex Appuleia agraria	103–100 BC	Saturninus	Tribune of the plebs	Made provision for public lands taken in Cisalpine Gaul from the Cimbri to be allocated to poor citizens.
Lex Appuleia de maiestate	103–100 BC	Saturninus	Tribune of the plebs	Established an equestrian court to try maiestas.
Lex Servilia Glaucia de Repetundis	101 BC	C. Servilius Glaucia	Tribune of the plebs	Made juries in property court composed by equites only.
Lex Caecilia Didia	98 BC	Q. Caecilius Metellus Nepos & T. Didius	Consuls	Required laws to proposed at least three market days before any vote. Also forbade omnibus bills, which are bills with a large amount of unrelated material.
Lex Licinia Mucia	95 BC	L. Licinius Crassus & Q. Mucius Scaevola	Consuls	Removed Latin and Italian allies from Rome's citizen-rolls.
Lex Iulia de Civitate Latinis et Sociis Danda	90 BC	Lucius Julius Caesar	Consul	Offered citizenship to all Italians who had not raised arms against Rome in the Social War.
Lex Plautia Judiciaria	89 BC	M. Plautius Silvanus	Tribune of the plebs	Chose jurors from other classes, not just the Equites.
Lex Plautia Papiria	89 BC	C. Papirius Carbo & M. Plautius Silvanus	Tribunes of the plebs	Granted citizenship to Roman allies.
Lex Pompeia de Transpadanis	89 BC	Cn. Pompeius Strabo	Consul	Granted Latin Right to the populations of Cisalpine Gaul.
Lex Valeria	82 BC	Lucius Valerius Flaccus	Interrex	Appointed Sulla dictator.
lex Cornelia de hostibus rei publicae	81 BC	Sulla	Dictator	Retroactively legalised Sulla's proscription.
Lex Cornelia annalis	81 BC	Sulla	Dictator	Reordered the cursus honorum, superseded the lex Villia Annalis of 180 BC.
Lex Cornelia de maiestate	81 BC	Sulla	Dictator	Treason law passed by Sulla to regulate the activities of pro-magistrates in their provinces, especially unapproved war and unauthorised travel.
Lex Cornelia de sicariis et veneficis	81 BC	Sulla	Dictator	Dealing with injuries and deaths obtained by magic.
Lex Aurelia de tribunicia potestate	75 BC	C. Aurelius Cotta	Consul	Former tribunes of the plebs can hold further magistracies (this right had been removed by Sulla).
Lex Cassia Terentia frumentaria	73 BC	C. Cassius Longinus & M. Terentius Varro Lucullus	Consuls	Required the distribution of wheat among the poor citizens.
Lex Terentia Cassia	73 BC	M. Terentius Varro Lucullus & C. Cassius Longinus	Consuls	Safeguarded Rome's grain supply and distributed grain at reduced rates.
Lex Gellia Cornelia	72 BC	L. Gellius Publicola & Cn. Cornelius Lentulus Clodianus	Consuls	Authorised Pompey to confer Roman citizenship to his clientela and Spaniards.
Lex Aurelia iudiciaria	70 BC	L. Aurelius Cotta	Praetor	Juries should be chosen from senators, equites and tribuni aerarii.
Lex Plautia de reditu lepidanorum	70 BC	Plautius	Tribune of the plebs	Granted a pardon to Lepidus' former associates.
Lex Antia sumptuaria	68 BC	C. Antius Restio	Tribune of the plebs	Forbade magistrates from attending banquets.
Lex Antonia de Termessibus	68 BC	C. Antonius Hybrida	Tribune of the plebs	Alliance with Termessus.
Lex Acilia Calpurnia	67 BC	C. Calpurnius Piso & M. Acilius Glabrio	Consuls	Permanent exclusion from office in cases of electoral corruption.
Lex Gabinia de piratis persequendis	67 BC	A. Gabinius	Tribune of the plebs	Granted special powers to Pompey in the Mediterranean to fight against pirates
Lex Roscia theatralis	67 BC	L. Roscius Otho	Tribune of the plebs	Allocated a place in Roman theaters to the equestrian order.
Lex Manilia	66 BC	C. Manilius	Tribune of the plebs	Pompey's actions against Mithridates.
Lex Papia de peregrinis	65 BC	C. Papius	Tribune of the plebs	Challenged false claims of citizenship and deported foreigners from Rome.
Lex Ampia	63 BC	T. Ampius Balbus	Tribune of the plebs	Allowed Pompey to wear the crown of bay at the Ludi Circenses.
Lex Tullia	63 BC	Cicero	Consul	Regulated election fraud (see ambitus).
Lex Junia Licinia	62 BC	D. Junius Silanus & L. Licinius Murena	Consuls	A reinforcement law passed to back up the earlier lex Caecilia Didia law of 98 BC.
Lex Aufidia de ambitu	61 BC	M. Aufidius Lurco	Tribune of the plebs	If a candidate promised money to a tribe and did not pay it, he should be unpunished; but if he did pay the money, he should further pay to each tribe (annually?) 3000 sesterces as long as he lived.
Lex Pupia	61 BC	M. Pupius Piso Frugi Calpurnianus	Consul	Senate could not meet on Comitiales Dies.
Lex Caecilia de vectigalibus	60 BC	Q. Caecilius Metellus Nepos Iunior	Praetor	Released lands and harbors in Italy from the payment of taxes.
Lex Iulia de repetundis	59 BC	Julius Caesar	Consul	Regarding extortion in the provinces.
Lex Vatinia	59 BC	P. Vatinius	Tribune of the plebs	Gave Julius Caesar governorship of Cisalpine Gaul and of Illyricum for five years.
Leges Clodiae	58 BC	P. Clodius Pulcher	Tribune of the plebs	Seven laws: (1) Lex Clodia de Auspiciis: repealed the leges Aeliae et Fufiae. (2) Lex Clodia de Censoribus: prescribed certain rules for the Roman Censors in exercising their functions as inspectors of public morals. (3) Lex Clodia de Civibus Romanis Interemptis: threatened punishment for anyone who offered fire and water to those who had executed Roman citizens without a trial. (4) Lex Clodia Frumentaria: required the distribution of grain to Rome's poor citizens for free. (5) Lex Clodia de Sodalitatibus: declared that certain clubs of a "semi-political nature" (i.e. armed gangs) were lawful. (6) Lex Clodia de Libertinorum Suffragiis: attempted to extend freedmen's (i.e. ex-slaves') voting rights. (7) Lex Clodia de Rege Ptolemaeo et de exsulibus Byzantinis: pertained to several of Rome's eastern provinces and vassal states.
Lex Licinia Pompeia	55 BC	Pompey and Crassus	Consuls	Caesar's proconsulship in both the Gauls was extended for another 5 years.
Lex Trebonia	55 BC	C. Trebonius	Tribune of the plebs	Granted a five year proconsulship: in Syria to Crassus, in Spain to Pompey.
Lex Caecilia de censoria	52 BC	Q. Caecilius Metellus Pius Scipio	Consul	Repealed the lex Clodia de Censoribus passed by the tribune of the plebs Clodius in 58 BC, which had regulated the Censors.
Lex Pompeia de ambitu	52 BC	Pompey	Consul	Expediting trials for electoral corruption, and allowing those convicted to escape punishment by successfully prosecuting others.
Lex Antonia de proscriptorum liberis	49 BC	Mark Antony	Tribune of the plebs	Law removing penalties on the descendants of people proscribed by Sulla, notably access to magistracies.
Lex Roscia	49 BC	L. Roscius Fabatus	Praetor	Caesar proposed full Latin Rights on the people of Transalpine Gaul.
Lex Iulia municipalis	45 BC	Julius Caesar	Dictator and consul	Set regulations for the Italian municipalities.
Leges Antoniae	44 BC	Mark Antony	Consul	Nine laws passed by Mark Antony after the death of Julius Caesar: (1) lex Antonia de dictatura in perpetuum tollenda: abolished the dictatorship (2) lex Antonia de actis Caesaris confirmandis: confirmed Caesar's deeds (3) lex antonia de coloniis in agros deducentis: settled veterans (4) lex Antonia agraria: granted lands to Antony's supporters (5) lex Antonia de provinciis consularibus: gave a 5-year proconsulship to the consuls (6) lex Antonia de permutatione provinciarum: gave provincial command of the two Gaul to Antony (7) lex antonia de mense quintili: renamed the month of July (8) lex Antonia de quinto die ludorum romanorum rotondi: added a 5th day to the Ludi Romani (9) lex Antonia iudiciaria: altered the composition of juries.
Lex Cassia	44 BC	L. Cassius Longinus	Tribune of the plebs	Allowed Julius Caesar to add new individuals to the patrician (aristocratic) class.
Lex de permutatione provinciae	44 BC	Mark Antony	Consul	Gave himself a five-year command in Cisalpine and Transalpine Gaul in lieu of Macedon. Also gave authorization to transfer Caesar's legions from Macedon to the new provinces.
Lex Ursonensis	44 BC	Mark Antony	Consul	Foundation charter of the Caesarean colonia Iulia Genetiva.
Lex Titia	43 BC	P. Titius	Tribune of the plebs	Gave Octavian, Mark Antony and Lepidus full powers to defeat the assassins of Julius Caesar; legalised the second triumvirate.
Lex Petronia	32 BC (before)	Petronius	Tribune of the plebs	Regulated appointments of municipal prefects.
Lex Iulia de Ambitu	18 BC	Augustus	Emperor	Penalised bribery when acquiring political offices.
Lex Iulia de maritandis ordinibus	18 BC	Augustus	Emperor	Marrying-age celibates and young widows that would not marry were barred from receiving inheritances and from attending public games.
Lex Iulia de adulteriis coercendis	17 BC	Augustus	Emperor	Made conjugal unfaithfulness a public as well as a private offence, with banishment a possible penalty.
Lex Fufia Caninia	2 BC	C. Fufius Geminus & L. Caninius Gallus	Consuls	Limited manumissions.
Lex Aelia Sentia	4 AD	Sex. Aelius Catus & C. Sentius Saturninus	Consuls	Manumissions of slaves.
Lex Iulia de vicesima hereditatum	5 AD	Augustus	Emperor	Instituted a 5 percent tax on testamentary inheritances, exempting close relatives.
Lex Valeria Cornelia	5 AD	L. Valerius Messalla Volesus & Cn. Cornelius Cinna Magnus	Consuls	Regarding voting in the Comitia Centuriata.
Lex Papia Poppaea	9 AD	M. Papius Mutilus & Q. Poppaeus Secundus	Consuls	Regarding marriage.
Lex Junia Norbana	19 AD	M. Junius Silanus Torquatus & L. Norbanus Balbus	Consuls	Regarding status of freedmen.
Lex Visellia	24 AD			Regulated the activities of freedmen
Lex de Imperio Vespasiani	69 AD	Unknown	Consuls?	Conferred powers, privileges and exemptions on the emperor Vespasian.
Lex Manciana	69–96 AD			Dealt with imperial and private cases in North Africa, regulated relations between cultivators and the proprietors.
Lex Hadriana	117–138 AD	Hadrian	Emperor	Enabled permanent tenants to develop land, it was an extension of the lex Manciana.
Lex citationis	426 AD	Valentinian III	Emperor	During court proceedings, only five Roman lawyers could be cited.

== Post-Roman law codes based on Roman legislation ==
- lex Romana Burgundionum – one of the law tables for Romans after the fall of the Western Roman Empire
- lex Romana Visigothorum (506 AD) – one of the law tables for Romans after the fall of the Western Roman Empire

== General denominations ==
- lex agraria – A law regulating distribution of public lands
- lex annalis – A law regarding qualifications for magistracies, such as age or experience
- lex ambitus – A law involving electoral bribery and corruption; see ambitus
- lex curiata – Any law passed by the comitia curiata. These included Roman adoptions, particularly so-called "testamentary adoptions" (famously in 59 BC when the patrician Clodius Pulcher was adopted into a plebeian gens in order to run for the office of tribune of the plebs) and the lex curiata de imperio which granted imperium to senior Roman magistrates under the Republic, likely also ratifying the choice of a new king during the monarchy. It was the traditional basis for the later lex de Imperio allowing imperial succession.
- lex frumentaria – A law regulating the price of grain
- lex sumptuaria – A law regulating the use of luxury items and public manifestations of wealth

== Other ==
- Constitution of the Roman Republic – Set the separation of powers and checks and balances of the Roman Republic
- Acceptilatio – spoken statement of debt or obligation release
- Constitutio Antoniniana – granted citizenship to the Empire's freemen
- Corpus Iuris Civilis – codification by emperor Justinian
- Syro-Roman law book – a compilation of secular legal texts from the eastern Roman Empire
- Stipulatio – basic oral contract
- Twelve Tables – The first set of Roman laws published by the Decemviri in 451 BC, which would be the starting point of the elaborate Roman constitution. The twelve tables covered issues of civil, criminal and military law. Every Roman that went to school was supposed to know them by heart.
- Licinio-Sextian rogations – series of laws proposed by tribunes of the plebs, Gaius Licinius Stolo and Lucius Sextius Lateranus, enacted around 367 BC.
- Infamia – loss of legal or social standing
- Fustuariuma – severe form of military discipline in which a soldier was cudgeled to death.

== Bibliography ==
- Brennan, T. Corey, The Praetorship in the Roman Republic, Oxford University Press, 2000.
- François Hinard, Les proscriptions de la Rome républicaine, Rome, Ecole française de Rome, 1985. ISBN 2728300941
- ——, Rome, la dernière république, Recueil d'articles de François Hinard, textes réunis et présentés par Estelle Bertrand, Ausonius, Pessac, 2011. ISBN 9782356130426
- Gesine Manuwald, Cicero, Philippics 3–9, Volume 1: Introduction, Text and Translation, References and Indexes, Berlin/New York, De Gruyter, 2007. ISBN 9783110193251
- Ronald Syme, "Ten Tribunes", The Journal of Roman Studies, 1963, Vol. 53, Parts 1 and 2 (1963), pp. 55–60.
- Walbank, F. W., et al., The Cambridge Ancient History, vol. VII, part 2, The Rise of Rome to 220 BC, Cambridge University Press (1989).
