= Lex Calpurnia de repetundis =

Roman law (149 BC) against corruption

The lex Calpurnia de repetundis ("law of Calpurnius for the recovery of property") was a Roman law sponsored in 149 BC by the tribune of the plebs Lucius Calpurnius Piso. It established the first permanent criminal court in Roman history, in order to deal with the growing number of crimes committed by Roman governors in the provinces. The lex Calpurnia was a milestone in both Roman law and politics.

Before the lex Calpurnia, criminal cases were investigated by ad-hoc courts before one of the legislative assemblies, which were subject to emotion and rhetorical devices. Instead, the permanent court created by this law was presided by a praetor with a jury composed of senators, who therefore had to judge their peers. It appears that the scope and the penalty were very limited, as officials could only be sued for extortion, and they could only be forced to give back what they had stolen, without additional compensation. Moreover, provincial claimants had to be represented by a Roman patron at the court. Considering the restrictions of the lex Calpurnia and the fact that its author was a conservative, it has been suggested that Piso actually wanted to reinforce the powers of the Senate over the assemblies and the tribunes of the plebs.

However, the lex Calpurnia came to be used as a political weapon between senatorial factions. Two famous trials of the 130s BC indeed show that prominent politicians such as Metellus Macedonicus and Scipio Aemilianus prosecuted their enemies through the extortion court. Political interests then led to repetitive amendments of the lex Calpurnia, notably by increasing the penalties and altering the composition of the jury. The backbone of the law nevertheless remained in place well into the Roman Empire.

== Background ==
After the first two Punic Wars, the Roman Republic rapidly expanded outside Italy in Sicily, Sardinia and Corsica, Cisalpine Gaul, and Hispania Citerior and Ulterior. Roman governors often had a rapacious behaviour in these provinces, which they treated as a rapid source of wealth and prestige. A good number of misdeeds from governors are known; they were prosecuted through either a civil procedure or an ad-hoc court before the assembled people, often unsuccessfully. For example, in 171 the former consul Marcus Popillius Laenas was tried for having sold in slavery the Statellates, a Ligurian people, but the praetor assigned with the investigation delayed it until the case was dropped. As a result, there was general dissatisfaction with the way criminal governors could escape conviction.

In 150, Servius Sulpicius Galba was propraetor in Hispania Citerior and campaigned against the Lusitanians. He put an end to the war through treachery: he offered a generous peace to the Lusitanians, but slaughtered and enslaved most of them once they had surrendered. Outraged by Galba's treachery, the tribune of the plebs for 149 Lucius Scribonius Libo drafted a bill to set up an ad-hoc court to sue Galba. Scribonius was supported by Cato the Censor, who likely answered calls from his clients in Spain (Cato had a prominent patronage network in the Spanish provinces). On his return to Rome, Galba spoke against Scribonius' bill before the plebeian assembly, where the issue was debated. Galba was an outstanding orator and played on the crowd's emotions by bringing his children to the stage and shedding tears imploring for mercy; touched by his defence, the assembled people rejected Scribonius' bill.

Another tribune of the plebs for 149, Lucius Calpurnius Piso Frugi, wished to solve the problem raised by Galba's case by establishing a permanent criminal court to judge Roman officials. Like Cato, Piso was also an important patron in Spain, since his uncle Gaius Calpurnius Piso served there as praetor in 186. Piso passed his law through a plebiscite.

== The law ==
The lex Calpurnia established the first permanent court (lat.: quaestio perpetua) called into session every year, one of the most important innovations in the history of Roman law. It was presided by the peregrine praetor—the praetor who dealt with matters involving non-Roman citizens (lat. peregrinus: foreigner). The peregrine praetor de facto became a city praetor like the urban praetor, as this new responsibility forced him to remain in Rome during his office. The lex Calpurnia also created a jury, another innovation in the Roman legal system; Piso was perhaps inspired by similar jury courts in Greece, such as in Rhodes. The jurors had to be drawn exclusively from the Senate. The procedure to select the jurors is unknown; they could have been chosen freely by the peregrine praetor, or picked from a shortlist. The court could only prosecute senators.

Little is known on the details of the law, especially its proceedings and who could use it. One main problem is that only Roman citizens could make accusations before the court. Several theories have been made by modern scholars to explain how provincials could still sue former officials. Michael Crawford suggests that a temporary citizenship could be given to provincials for the time of the trial, but the majority of modern scholars consider that they had to be represented by Roman patrons who acted on their behalf. Moreover, the law's reach was quite restricted, focusing solely on charges of extortion and the return of property. It failed to address issues such as enslavement or massacre, like the actions taken by Galba against the Lusitanians in 150. Moreover, guilty officials could only be sentenced to refund the damage they caused; no penal sentences could be pronounced.

In order to explain the lex Calpurnia's mildness, Erich Gruen has suggested that Piso wished to strengthen the power of the Senate over the tribunes of the plebs and the popular assembly. Indeed, as with the previous ad-hoc courts, a criminal trial started under the lex Calpurnia could not be vetoed by a tribune of the plebs, and its verdict could not be appealed, which therefore massively increased the influence of the senate.

== Trials ==
No trial involving the lex Calpurnia is known for nine years after its adoption. The first recorded de repetundis trial was against Decimus Junius Silanus Manlianus, who was praetor in Macedonia in 141. The following year, a Macedonian embassy accused him of various exactions before the Senate, but Silanus' natural father—Titus Manlius Torquatus—requested the right to judge him privately first. As Torquatus was a former consul with a reputation of severity and came from a family with a strict moral code, his request was accepted by the Senate and the Macedonians. After hearing both parties at home, Torquatus found Silanus guilty and banished him from his sight, which prompted Silanus to commit suicide. The trial may have continued after Silanus' suicide in order to compensate the claimants.

Silanus' trial probably created interest at Rome, and several political groups saw in the lex Calpurnia a powerful weapon to use against opponents. In 138, four former consuls, Quintus Caecilius Metellus Macedonicus (consul in 144) and his brother Lucius Metellus Calvus (consul in 142), as well as Gnaeus and Quintus Servilius Caepio (consuls in 141 and 140), sued for extortion Quintus Pompeius, consul and proconsul in Hispania Citerior in 141 and 140. The family links between the Metelli and the Caepiones make it certain that they formed a faction and that their accusation was more motivated by their enmity against Pompeius than the welfare of the Spanish provincials. Pompeius was a homo novus, whose fast rise had upset many senators, but in spite of the impressive pedigree of his enemies, he was acquitted. Cicero tells that the jurors did not want to condemn a man because of the prestige of the accusers.

This use of the extortion court as a political weapon by the Metelli prompted Scipio Aemilianus to do the same against one of his enemies, Lucius Aurelius Cotta. In this case, the political motive is even more apparent, as Cotta had been consul in 144 and did not serve in a province. Scipio could have sued him earlier, but only did so after the extortion court became a "battleground for internal senatorial warfare". This time, Metellus Macedonicus was among the defendants of Cotta; his enmity with Scipio is well-documented. After seven adjournments, Cotta was finally acquitted. As with the previous case, it is probable that the senators who composed the jury did not want to be part of a political feud, albeit Appian tells that Cotta bribed the jurors.

In 137, Scipio supported a bill made by the tribune of the plebs Lucius Cassius Longinus Ravilla, which made compulsory the use of secret ballots in criminal cases brought before the popular assembly (except for high treason). It is likely that since the extortion court did not work as he had expected, Scipio thought that the more malleable popular juries would be better suited to convict his opponents. Besides, in 136, Scipio's enemy Marcus Aemilius Lepidus Porcina was prosecuted and condemned before the popular assembly.

== Amendments ==
The lex Calpurnia was the first of a long series of extortion laws passed in the last century of the Roman Republic, during which the composition of the juries became a divisive political topic. The first law to amend the lex Calpurnia was the obscure lex Junia, dated from 126 or 123, and ascribed to either Marcus Junius Silanus or Marcus Junius Congus. The lex Junia might have added equites—the second tier of the Roman aristocracy—to the jury.

In 122, the tribune of the plebs Manius Acilius Glabrio passed the lex Acilia repetundarum, as part of the vast program of reforms pushed by Gaius Gracchus. It made the jury exclusively drawn from the equites; senators could therefore no longer judge their peers and the prosecution success rate increased as a result. In addition, non-citizens could prosecute Roman officials, and were granted Roman citizenship if their accusation was successful. The lex Acilia finally doubled the fines for extortion, perhaps because the initial lex Calpurnia was thought to be too lenient with its simple restitution. The composition of the juries was changed again in 106, when the law of the consul Quintus Servilius Caepio stated that half of the jurors had to be senators. The lex Servilia Caepionis was reverted in 104 or 101 by the popularis tribune of the plebs Gaius Servilius Glaucia with the lex Servilia Glauciae, which gave full control of the jury back to the equites and punished convicted officials with the loss of citizenship. In 81, the conservative dictator Sulla removed all the equites from the courts with his lex Cornelia de maiestate. In 59, Julius Caesar as consul passed the very severe lex Iulia de repetundis which forced into exile guilty officials, and also replaced Sulla's law.

Finally, in 4 BC, Augustus passed the Senatus Consultum Calvisianum redefining the procedures for extortion by Roman officials; extortion was by now judged by a jury of senators, and the sanction was a simple restitution. Therefore, after almost 150 years of back and forth laws, Augustus returned to the initial dispositions of the lex Calpurnia.

The creation of a permanent extortion court also led the way to a number of subsequent permanent courts, each dealing with a particular crime, such as treason (majestas), bribery (ambitus), poisoning (veneficia), murderers and gangsters (sicarii), sedition (vis), etc.

== See also ==
- Roman law
- List of Roman laws

== Bibliography ==
=== Ancient sources ===
- Cicero, Pro Fonteio.
- Appian, Bellum Civile.

=== Modern sources ===
- Michael C. Alexander, Trials in the Late Roman Republic, 149 BC to 50 BC, University of Toronto Press, 1990.
- A. E. Astin, Scipio Aemilianus, Oxford, Clarendon Press, 1967.
- ——, Andrew Lintott, Elizabeth Rawson (editors), The Cambridge Ancient History, vol. IX, The Last Age of the Roman Republic, 146–43 B.C., Cambridge University Press, 1992.
- Ian Betts & Bruce Marshall, "The Lex Calpurnia of 149 BC", Antichthon, Volume 47, 2013, pp. 39–60.
- T. Corey Brennan, The Praetorship in the Roman Republic, Oxford University Press, 2000.
- T. Robert S. Broughton, The Magistrates of the Roman Republic, American Philological Association, 1951–1952.
- Gary Forsythe, The historian L. Calpurnius Piso Frugi and the Roman annalistic tradition, Lanham, MD, 1994. ISBN 9780819197429
- Erich S. Gruen, Roman Politics and the Criminal Courts, 149–78 B.C., Cambridge, MA, Harvard University Press, 1978.
- A. H. M. Jones, The Criminal Courts of the Roman Republic and Principate, Blackwell, 1972.
- A. W. Lintott, "The Procedure under the Leges Calpurnia and Iunia de Repetundis and the Actio per Sponsionem", in Zeitschrift für Papyrologie und Epigraphik, 1976, Bd. 22, pp. 207–214.
- Boris Rankov, "M. Iunius Congus the Gracchan", in M. Whitby & P. Hardie (editors), Homo Viator: Classical Essays for John Bramble, Bristol Classical Press, 1987. pp. 89–94.
- Richardson, J. S. (September 24, 2012). "The Purpose of the Lex Calpurnia de repetundis". The Journal of Roman Studies. 77. Open Publishing: 1–12. doi:10.2307/300571. JSTOR 300571.
- Howard Hayes Scullard, Roman Politics 220–150 B. C., Oxford University Press, 1951.
