= Lex Cassia =

lex Cassia may refer to:

- lex Cassia tabellaria (137 BC) – introduced secret votes in court jury decisions
- lex Cassia de senatu (104 BC) – required any senator to be expelled from the senate if they had been convicted of a crime, or if their power (imperium) had been revoked while serving as a magistrate
- lex Cassia (44 BC?) – allowed Julius Caesar to add new individuals to the patrician (aristocratic) class
- lex Cassia Terentia frumentaria (73 BC) – required the distribution of corn among the poor citizens
