= Lex Gabinia (disambiguation) =

lex Gabinia may refer to:

- lex Gabinia tabellaria (139 BC), on secret ballots
- lex Gabinia de piratis persequendis (67 BC), granting Pompey an extraordinary command against pirates in the Mediterranean
