= Lex Pompeia de ambitu =

Roman electoral law of 52 BCE

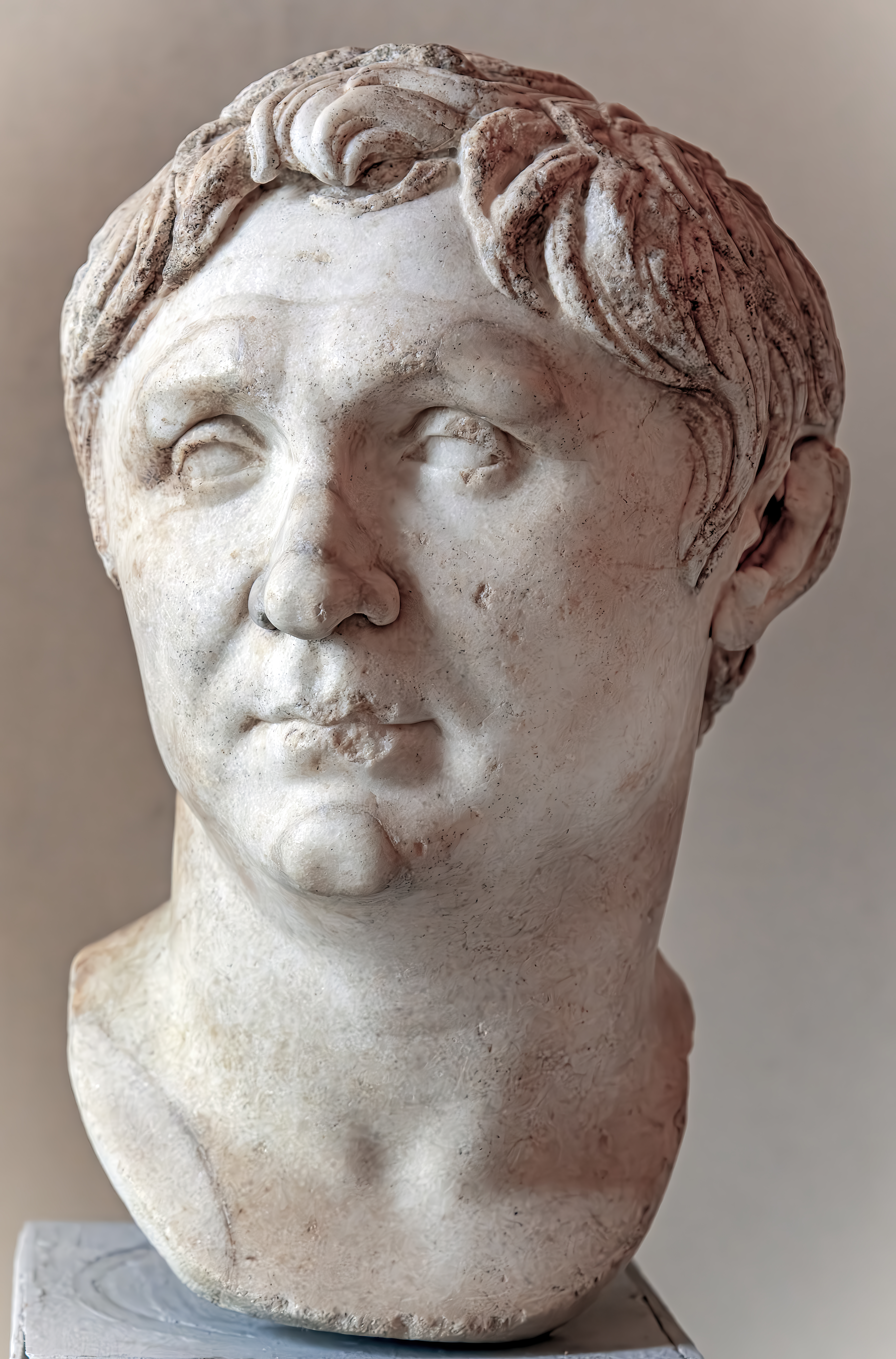
A portrait bust of Pompey the Great, the originator of the lex Pompeia de ambitu.

The lex Pompeia de ambitu was a law of the Roman Republic, passed in 52 BCE, aimed at prosecuting bribery and corruption in elections. It was proposed and enacted by Pompey the Great, who used it to prosecute and exile his political enemies.

The law originated in the political crisis of the 50s BCE, in which electoral violence and corruption led to political paralysis and deepened Rome's growing political crisis. The precise definition of ambitus — the crime that could be prosecuted under the law — was ambiguous even to the Romans, but it centred around the improper use of wealth or bribery for political advantage. The lex Pompeia followed a series of similar laws, including the lex Baebia de ambitu of 181 BCE, the lex Acilia Calpurnia of 67 BCE and the lex Tullia of 63 BCE, which imposed increasingly severe penalties for ambitus, eventually punishing the crime with exile. Pompey's law allowed those prosecuted under it to escape punishment by naming and prosecuting others who had also breached its terms.

Pompey used accusations of ambitus under the law to persecute his political enemies, notably Gaius Memmius, a former praetor who was tried and exiled under the law in 52 BCE. The law was also perceived as a means of attacking Julius Caesar, Pompey's political rival, as it theoretically opened him up to prosecution for his actions during his consulship of 59 BCE.

== Background ==
Roman politics in the 60s and 50s BCE were characterised by political gridlock, mob violence and the dominance of a series of military strongmen, as well as growing strain on the Republic's institutional and constitutional systems. Since approximately 59 BCE, the state had been dominated by the unsteady alliance of three dominant figures, Julius Caesar, Marcus Licinius Crassus and Pompey.

During 53 BCE, the sense of crisis grew. The new consul for that year, Appius Claudius Pulcher, previously an ally of the triumvirs, launched a prosecution against Marcus Aemilius Scaurus, an ally of Pompey's and candidate for the consulship of 53 BCE. Further prosecutions of the triumvirs' allies follows, led by allies of Cato.

The elections for 53 BCE were hugely delayed due to political violence and bribery. The two outgoing consuls, Lucius Domitius Ahenobarbus and Appius Claudius, bribed two candidates for the consulate, Gaius Memmius (an ally of Pompey's whose candidature was also supported by Caesar) and Gnaeus Domitius Calvinus, a partisan of Caesar. In theory, a lex curiata de imperio needed to be passed by the largely-ceremonial comitia curiata before the magistrates could hold imperium: while this was largely a formality, the lack of such a law threw into question the legitimacy of their actions in office, as well as their right to hold proconsular commands in the following year. Ahenobarbus and Claudius therefore offered Memmius and Domitius Calvinus their support, in exchange for a promise that, if elected as consuls, the two would arrange for three augurs to vouch that they were present at the issuing of a lex curiata, and for two ex-consuls to vouch that they had been present during the passing of a lawful decree for the allocation of proconsular commands – neither of which had truly taken place.

When Memmius exposed the conspiracy, likely with the aim of implicating Domitius Calvinus and embarrassing his patron Caesar, all four were indicted for ambitus. The senate delayed elections to hold an inquiry, but the specific steps forward became quickly contested and various tribunes vetoed the elections. After more than seven months without any magistrates, elections were finally held in July 53 BCE. By this point, the political situation had become even more violent. Street battles in the city between Milo and Clodius' armed gangs culminated in the murder of Clodius on 18 January, near Bovillae on the Via Appia, by Milo's retinue. At Clodius' funeral on 19 January, the senate-house and neighbouring Basilica Porcia were both burned down.

Pompey returned to Rome in February, making him the only triumvir in the city: Caesar had been campaigning in Gaul since 56 BCE, while Crassus had launched his own military adventure into Parthia early in 53 BCE, resulting in his death at the Battle of Carrhae a few months later. At the urging of Cato and his allies, who felt that only Pompey's auctoritas could control the situation and who feared that he might otherwise push to establish a dictatorship, Pompey was made sole consul for 52 BCE.

== Antecedents ==
In Roman law, ambitus was a crime of political corruption, mainly a candidate's attempt to influence the outcome (or direction) of an election through bribery or other forms of soft power.

The legal name ambitus was a generic term, covering techniques of canvassing and self-promotion taken to be improper, as well as the more specific charge of using largitiones (bribery). The precise boundaries of ambitus were not legally defined, and indeed overlapped closely with expected political practice: as Cicero noted, ambitus (self-promotion) and largitio (bribery) were forbidden by law, but liberalitas (generosity) and benignitas (acts of kindness) were encouraged.

The earliest laws against what would later be called ambitus were traditionally dated to 432 BCE, and forbade those standing for election "to add white to their dress". This referred to the practice of whitening one's toga when canvassing for votes, which became such common practice by the Classical period that the term candidatus ('whitened one') became the usual term for one standing for election.

The lex Baebia de ambitu of 181 BCE, passed by the plebeian consul Marcus Baebius Tamphilus, outlawed electoral bribery and forbade those convicted of it from standing as candidates for ten years. This was stiffened by the lex Acilia Calpurnia of 67 BCE to permanent exclusion from office, loss of senatorial rank and a fine. Under the lex Tullia of 63 BCE, passed under the consulship of Cicero, these penalties were further increased to ten years' exile.

== Terms ==
Relatively little is known about the precise terms of the law instituted by Pompey. Its primary function seems to have been to expedite the use of accusations of ambitus as a political weapon against Pompey's enemies.

The law shortened trials for ambitus and reduced the opportunity for defendants to defend themselves, giving them a maximum of three hours in which to speak.

The law also allowed any citizen to prosecute anyone who had held office since Pompey's first consulship in 70 BCE. This was widely taken as an attack on Caesar, who had been consul in 59; according to Appian, Pompey "pretended to be indignant at the mention of Caesar's name, as though he were above suspicion", and pointed out that he too had been consul during that time, and so was himself vulnerable to prosecution.

Another notable clause allowed those found guilty under the law to obtain remission of their sentences by successfully prosecuting others under it: either a single person guilty of a greater breach, or two people guilty of an equal or lesser infraction. In 52 BCE, the former praetor Gaius Memmius made use of this provision when condemned for his part in the bribery scandal of 53 BCE by accusing Metellus Scipio, who had recently become Pompey's own father-in-law. However, Pompey successfully pressured Memmius to drop the charges by making public his support for Metellus Scipio: he put on mourning clothes, a traditional means of seeking sympathy and support, and summoned all of the jurors for the case to his own house.

Previous leges de ambitu, specifically the lex Tullia of 63 BCE, prescribed ten years' exile as the punishment for ambitus, as well as the loss of senatorial rank, disqualification from seeking further office, and a fine. Upon failing to overturn his conviction, Memmius went into exile in Athens, which probably indicates that exile remained the primary punishment under Pompey's law.

== See also ==
- Roman Law
- List of Roman laws

== Bibliography ==
- Drogula, Fred K (2019). Cato the Younger: life and death at the end of the Roman republic. New York: Oxford University Press. ISBN 978-0-19-086902-1. OCLC 1090168108.
- Gruen, Erich (1995) [1974]. Last generation of the Roman republic. Berkeley: University of California Press. ISBN 0-520-02238-6.
- Lewis, Charlton T.; Short, Charles (1879). A Latin Dictionary. Oxford: Oxford University Press.
- Lintott, Andrew (1999). The Constitution of the Roman Republic. Oxford: Oxford University Press.
- Ramsey, John T (2016). "How and why was Pompey Made Sole Consul in 52 BC?". Historia: Zeitschrift für Alte Geschichte. 65 (3): 298–324. doi:10.25162/historia-2016-0017. ISSN 0018-2311. JSTOR 45019234. S2CID 252459421.
- Magnuson, Joseph S. (1914). 'De Ambitu et Leges de Ambitu (PhD). University of Kansas.
