= Lex Aebutia de magistratibus extraordinariis =

Roman law on public offices

Lex Aebutia de magistratibus extraordinariis (The Aebutian Law Concerning Extraordinary Magistracies) was a law established in ancient Rome during the early 2nd century BC, though the date remains uncertain. It is likewise uncertain whether this Lex Aebutia was part of the Lex Aebutia de formulis.

Presumably introduced by the magistrate Sextus Aelius, this law prohibited the sponsor of legislation creating a public office (curatio ac potestas, lit. office of trust or power) from holding that office. The colleagues of the sponsor in his magistracy and his near relatives by blood and marriage likewise were forbidden from the new office.

== See also ==
- Roman Law
- List of Roman laws
