= Lex Roscia theatralis =

Ancient Roman law

The lex Roscia theatralis was a Roman law of 67 BC that reserved 14 rows of good seats in the theater for members of the equestrian order. It was sponsored by the tribune Roscius Otho. The equites or "knights" who had this privilege were presumably not all those who met the property requirements under the census for admission to the order, but rather those who had the right of the "public horse", a smaller and more elite group.

The Latin poet Horace refers to it satirically in his Epistulae, and wonders whether melior est an puerorum nenia (it is really better than the children's nursery rhyme).

== See also ==
- Roman law
- List of Roman laws
