= Lex Aufeia =

Ancient Roman law

The lex Aufeia was a Roman law, known only from a passage of Aulus Gellius, giving an account of part a speech against the law by Gaius Gracchus. The author of the law is unknown.

The law has been interpreted as a ratification of Manius Aquilius' Asian settlement. However, nothing in the passage supports this assessment. The passage indicates that the law applied to Asia since Mithridates and Nicomedes were respectively supporting and opposing it. It is probable that Gracchus was trying to reserve land for Roman taxation rather than have the revenues go to Mithridates.

== See also ==
- Asia (Roman province)
- List of Roman laws
- Roman Law
