= Lex Aelia et Fufia =

Ancient Roman law around 150 BC on obnuntiation

The Lex Aelia et Fufia (the Aelian and Fufian Law) was established around the year 150 BC in the Roman Republic. The presumed subject of this legislation was the extension of the right of obnuntiatio, that is, reporting unfavorably concerning the omens observed at the Legislative Assemblies, thus forcing an end to public business until the next lawful day. This right, previously reserved to the College of Augurs, was extended to all of the magistrates, thus denying a key political advantage to politicians who were members of that College. This law was repealed in 58 BC by the Leges Clodiae.

== See also ==
- Roman law
- List of Roman laws

== Modern works ==
- Tatum, W. Jeffrey. The Patrician Tribune: P. Clodius Pulcher. Studies in the History of Greece and Rome (University of North Carolina Press, 1999) hardcover ISBN 0-8078-2480-1
- Fezzi, L: Il tribuno Clodio (Roma-Bari, Laterza, 2008) ISBN 88-420-8715-7
