= Acceptilation =

Modern Scots law regarding obligations

Acceptilation is the application of the Roman law principle of acceptilatio in modern Scots law regarding obligations, whereby a creditor verbally acknowledges a verbal obligation as having been discharged, even though it has not been directly performed, by accepting that some other performance or payment than had originally been specified is sufficient to extinguish the obligation. It is considered a satisfaction of an obligation, rather than its performance. The payment or performance accepted can be merely imaginary, making it a way to cancel payment of a debt by stating that it has been discharged.
