= Lex Atilia Marcia =

Ancient Roman law

The lex Atilia Marcia was a Roman law, introduced by the tribunes of the plebs Lucius Atilius and Gaius Marcius in 311 BC. The law empowered the people to elect 16 military tribunes for each of the four legions.

== Background ==
The law was passed against a background of ongoing class struggle in Republican Rome. Prior to this legislation military tribunes had been selected rather than elected, the position being largely in the gift of the commanding magistrates, the dictator or the consuls.

== Provisions ==
From 311 the 16 military tribunes were to be elected by popular vote.

A separate piece of legislation was also passed enforcing the election of the naval commissioners in charge of commissioning and refitting the fleet.

== See also ==
- Conflict of the Orders
- List of Roman laws
- Roman Law
