= Lex Papiria de dedicationibus =

Law in ancient Rome

Lex Papiria de dedicationibus (The Papirian Law Concerning Dedications) was a law established in ancient Rome around 304 BC, though the date is uncertain.

According to Cicero, it was an old law introduced by the tribunes that forbade the dedication of a temple, and for religious purposes, or of an altar without permission of the Popular Assembly. By the late 3rd century BC, the legal procedure for dedicating a temple apparently required introduction in the Roman Senate, reference of the petition to the College of Pontiffs, and then proposal to the Popular Assembly for final approval. By the mid-2nd century, the Lex Papiria probably was used as precedent to decide what approval was necessary to dedicate a statue. What is unclear is whether the Lex Papiria governed dedications generally or only by imperatores and other magistrates of at least praetorian rank. It is also unclear whether the Lex expressly forbade dedications by magistrates of lower rank such as the tribunes and the aediles.

Much of what we know about the law is due to its importance in Cicero's action for deconsecration in 57 BC before the College of Pontiffs. Cicero's opponent Clodius had dedicated Cicero's house in Rome as a shrine to Libertas, and Cicero sought relief on the grounds that Clodius' dedication had violated the Lex Papiria. Clodius' defense apparently was that the Lex Clodia de exsilio Ciceronis contained a sufficient authorization for the dedication.

== See also ==
- Roman Law
- List of Roman laws
