= Lex Caecilia de censoria =

Roman census law

Lex Caecilia De Censoria (The Law of Quintus Caecilius Metellus Pius Scipio Nasica on the Censors) was passed by Metellus Scipio, Roman Consul of 52 BC. It repealed a law passed by the tribune Publius Clodius Pulcher in 58 BC, which had prescribed certain rules for the Censors in exercising their functions as inspectors of public morals (mores). It also required the concurrence of both Censors to inflict the nota censoria. During the census (conducted once every five years), the Censors could place a nota next to the name of a citizen, usually for offenses such as bankruptcy, cowardice, or having been a gladiator. If a citizen had a nota placed besides his name, he was subject to a range of penalties, including fines, exile, assignment to an inferior tribe for voting purposes, or even the loss of his citizenship. Thus, by requiring concurrence for the placement of a nota, this law placed an additional check on the powers of the Censors. This was typically the only act that required the concurrence of both Censors. Also, when a senator had been already convicted before an ordinary court, this law permitted the Censors to remove him from the senate in a summary way.

== See also ==
- Roman Law
- List of Roman laws
