= Lex Appuleia de maiestate =

Roman treason law

The lex Appuleia de maiestate was a Roman law introduced by Lucius Appuleius Saturninus, passed during one of his two tribunates, either 103 BC or 100 BC. The exact provisions are unknown, but it attempted to protect the sovereignty of the Roman people as represented by the tribunate. It apparently punished incompetent military commanders.

== The provisions of the lex Appuleia ==
The law established the permanent criminal court in Rome, a quaestio maiestas, to deal with crimes against the Roman people: treason. The juries in this court consisted of equestrians. The law established maiestas as a separate crime from perduellio.

== Prosecutions ==
- Quintus Servilius Caepio - quaestor 100 BC.

== See also ==
- Roman Law
- List of Roman laws
- Plebeian tribune
