= Lex Luci Lucerina =

- Text of the Lex Luci Lucerina
- Type: Roman law
- Material: stone
- Writing: Latin script
- Created: 314-100 BCE
- Discovered: 1847; Likely in a cemetery by Luceria
- Present location: Likely still within the Palazzo Bruno
- Language: Latin language
- Culture: ancient Rome

The Lex Luci Lucerina is an ancient Roman law discovered in 1847 at Luceria. The inscription outlines rules concerning the dumping of waste in a specific area, either a sacred grove or an area previously used as a cemetery.

== Discovery and history ==
The law was first discovered in 1847 and, on the same day it was discovered, it was also first transcribed by a local antiquarian named Francesco del Buono. In an April 1877 letter to Giuseppe Fiorelli, an archaeologist named G. B. D'Amelj detailed the circumstances of the object's discovery, stating that it was originally uncovered in a cemetery. According to D'Amelj, this graveyard contained numerous burials spread across both multiple geologic layers and chronological periods. Nevertheless, D'Amelj groups all of these together under the same category, unilaterally denoting them as funerary urns ("urne sepolcrali"). Supposedly, these urns had Latin inscriptions on their exterior side and, on their interiors, writings in foreign languages, presumably Oscan. If this description is accurate, it would imply that the urns were at least partially composed of reused materials, which itself indicates that the urns were, unlike other known Roman ossuaries, not constructed only of one material. Moreover, there are no known examples of any urns or inscriptions from the site that match the characteristics described by D'Amelj. Ultimately, it is likely that the terminology of "urne sepolcrali" is inaccurate, though D'Amelj's more general mention of different types of graves from different eras may still be correct. Even if the D'Amelj's account is accurate, its general unreliability prevents modern scholars from properly assessing the context of the Lucerian law.

D'Amelj acquired a copy of the law from del Buono and later produced the first edited edition of the text. This version of the inscription was, however, problematic—D'Amelj had failed to properly distinguish between illegible letters and interpuncts separating words. Given the unreliability of this edited edition, the classicist Theodor Mommsen traveled to Lucera with the hopes of personally examining the stone and verifying its supposed unusual features. When Mommsen arrived, he set about removing the stone, which he found lodged inside the foundation of a 16th-century Palazzo Bruno with the inscribed side hidden from view. Mommsen was outraged at the treatment of the artifact, considering it most barbaric ("tam barbare"), and for this he exprobrated his local guides ("ducibus comitibusque meis Lucerinis ... exprobrassem"). To accomplish this task, he procured the support of his friends Giuseppe Fiorelli and Angelo De Gubematis. Nevertheless, Mommsen failed in his efforts, and the stone still remained in place even two years later when he had finally published his rendition of the text.

There were two additional efforts to reclaim the stone, one in 1903, and again later in 1937 when the palazzo within which it was contained was at risk of collapsing. Neither attempt, however, was successful, as both faced both financial constraints and challenges from local municipal officials, who supported a local tradition that maintained that the stone had been destroyed on the night following its original discovery in 1847. G. B. Gifuni, an archaeologist who led the 1937 attempt to find the stone, argued against the veracity of the tale of the stone's destruction, labeling it as a "speciosa storiella." Ultimately, the text most likely still remains somewhere within the Palazzo Bruno.

== Date ==
The exact date of the text is unclear, though it was probably composed after the Romans had already firmly established their presence in the area, which sets a terminus post quem of 314 BCE, when the colony at Lucera was founded. It is also possible to identify an approximate terminus ante quem for the text; it was most likely created prior to the end of the 2nd-century BCE, as the language of the inscription is particularly archaic and such antiquated linguistic features were extremely rare after the Gracchan period.

== Text ==
=== In Latin ===
IN⸱HOCE⸱LOVCARID⸱STIRCVS
NE⸱ //IS⸱FVNDATID⸱NEVE⸱CADAVER
PROIECITAD⸱NEVE⸱PARENTATID
SEI⸱QVIS⸱ARVORSV⸱HAC⸱FAXIT ///IVM
QVIS⸱VOLET⸱PRO⸱IOVDICATOD⸱NI
MANVM⸱INIECTO⸱ESTOD⸱SEIVE
MAG///STERATVS⸱VOLET⸱MOLTARE

/////CETOD////

=== In English ===
In this grove no person shall pour out dung nor shall cast away a dead body nor shall make solemn sacrifice in honor of his deceased ancestors. If anyone acts contrary to these rules on him, as on a person adjudged guilty, shall be the laying on of hands in the amount of fifty sesterces by whoever wishes. Or if a magistrate wishes to fine him it shall be lawful so to do.

— Translation by Allan Chester Johnson, Paul Robinson Coleman-Norton, and Frank Card Bourne

== Analysis ==
=== Meaning of loucarid ===
The text opens with the line "in hoce loucarid" ("in this loucarid"), the first two words of which are clear, though the third term is of disputed interpretation. One theory equates the term semantically with lucus ("sacred grove") and proposes that it is to be understood as a third declension neuter i-stem with an ablative singular ending -id, either due to the influence of the Oscan language or formed within dialectal Latin by analogy with the first and second declension endings -ad and -od. However, the classicist John Bodel argues that the law more likely applied to a burial ground rather than a sacred grove, as the text and archaeological context of the inscription is much closer to other known Roman laws concerning mortuary practices rather than groves. On this basis, Bodel suggests that the term loucarid may have instead referred to the headquarters of an organization of undertakers, such as is known from the Lucus Libitinae ("grove of Libitina") at Puteoli. There is historical evidence suggesting that the town of Luceria may have been in need of such funerary services, as—according to Livy—after the Romans had retaken the town from the Samnites, the Roman army massacred the population of the settlement. Bodel argues that, following such a sharp increase in death, it would be reasonable for the town to section off an area of a cemetery and dedicate it specifically to the undertakers and their use. However, the classicist Nicholas Purcell argues that Bodel's proposed link with the Lucus Libitinae is somewhat contradictory to his earlier claims that the site had nothing in common with Roman sacred groves. If a connection with the particular type of graveyard-grove exemplified by the Lucus Libitinae is accepted, then—according to Purcell—there is no reason to suppose that the text had no relation with sacred groves in general.

=== Prohibitions ===
The term stircus is evidently an alternative, perhaps dialectal, spelling of stercus ("dung, excrement"), though—according to Bodel—it is unclear whether the term is utilized in the sense "excrement" or merely refers to a more general type of refuse. The form fundatid is most likely connected to the verb fundo, -ere ("to pour out") with a secondary recharacterization as a first conjugation verbs, perhaps on the model of Oscan first conjugation perfect subjunctives marked by the sequence -tt-i- (e.g. as in Oscan tríbarakattíns). Since the Romans are known to have occasionally deposited waste in public heaps of trash, the phrase "stircus ... fundatid," according to Bodel, probably refers to the act of dumping garbage in a public place. In the following part of the sentence, the morphologically problematic term proiecitad may be interpreted as an error for *proiecatid, which itself was perhaps secondarily reshaped from proicio, -ere ("to throw out, expel") according to the same model as fundatid. When associated with words for dead bodies (i.e. cadaver, "carcass, cadaver"), the verb proicio frequently described the act of leaving behind unburied corpses, naturally indicating that this section of the Lex Luci Lucerina also refers to such an action. Afterwards, the final part of the sentence contains the term parentatid, which is to be interpreted as a form of the word parentō ("to make a sacrifice in honor of the dead"). Consequently, the entire sequence must stipulate a prohibition against parentatio rites, which were ceremonies performed in honor of the dead. According to Bodel, since such funerary rituals were a common practice in Oscan, Samnite, and Roman culture, their prohibition would have essentially barred any burial at the site.

Collectively, all three prohibitions forbid the acts of abandoning some sort of substance at the site, be it either trash or corpses, perhaps as part of a desire to protect the space and guarantee its status as a locus purus ("pure location"). The act of instituting such a policy indicates that the area had been used as a funerary space in the past, which is confirmed by D'Amelj report of a cemetery unearthed at the site. Thus, according to Bodel, the law can be understood as an attempt to alter the status quo: It seeks to bar activity that had previously occurred quite frequently in the area. In this manner, Bodel argues, it differs from the only known Roman law concerning a sacred grove, the Lex Luci Spoletina, which sought to safeguard the already existing religious practices at a grove, whereas the Lex Luci Lucerina aimed to alter the usage of a site. The text of the Lex Luci Lucerina does, however, parallel an edict of the early 1st-century BCE praetor Lucius Sentius uncovered in the Esquiline necropolis. Both the Sentian and Lucerian laws prohibit the abandonment of refuse in certain areas, with the Sentian law specifically barring the dumping of corpses within 200 meters of the Servian Wall, and they also both sought to change established funerary customs.

=== Punishments ===
Afterwards, the text describes the consequences for violating the rules, stating that such punishments apply "If anyone acts contrary to these rules on him, as on a person adjudged guilty." According to Allan Chester Johnson, Paul Robinson Coleman-Norton, and Frank Card Bourne, this sentence means that an individual who infringed upon these rules would be viewed in the same manner as someone who had lost a lawsuit and was thus required to pay compensation. The text proceeds to state that the exact punishment in question will be the "laying on of hands ... by whoever wishes," which refers to the seizure of property in Roman legal language. It is possible that the law may even specify that the value of the property had to amount to 50 sesterces. Such a policy is only indicated by the presence of the letters NI, which may be emended to NL, and thus interpreted as an acronym for nummum quinquaginta ("50 coins"). Alternatively, the law also permits a magistrate to fine the guilty party if they should wish.
