= Lex Hieronica =

Ancient Roman law

The Lex Hieronica was a unique system of regulations concerning the agricultural taxation of Sicily by the Roman Republic. The taxation system was named after King Hiero II of Syracuse. The basic provision requires that farmers pay ten percent of their produce in tax to Rome. It is likely that the Lex Hieronica was an appropriation of both Hiero II's taxation system of his Kingdom and the Carthaginian taxation system of western Sicily. The date of establishment of the law is uncertain. It was likely implemented sometime in between the first two Punic wars.

== The sources ==
=== Literary ===
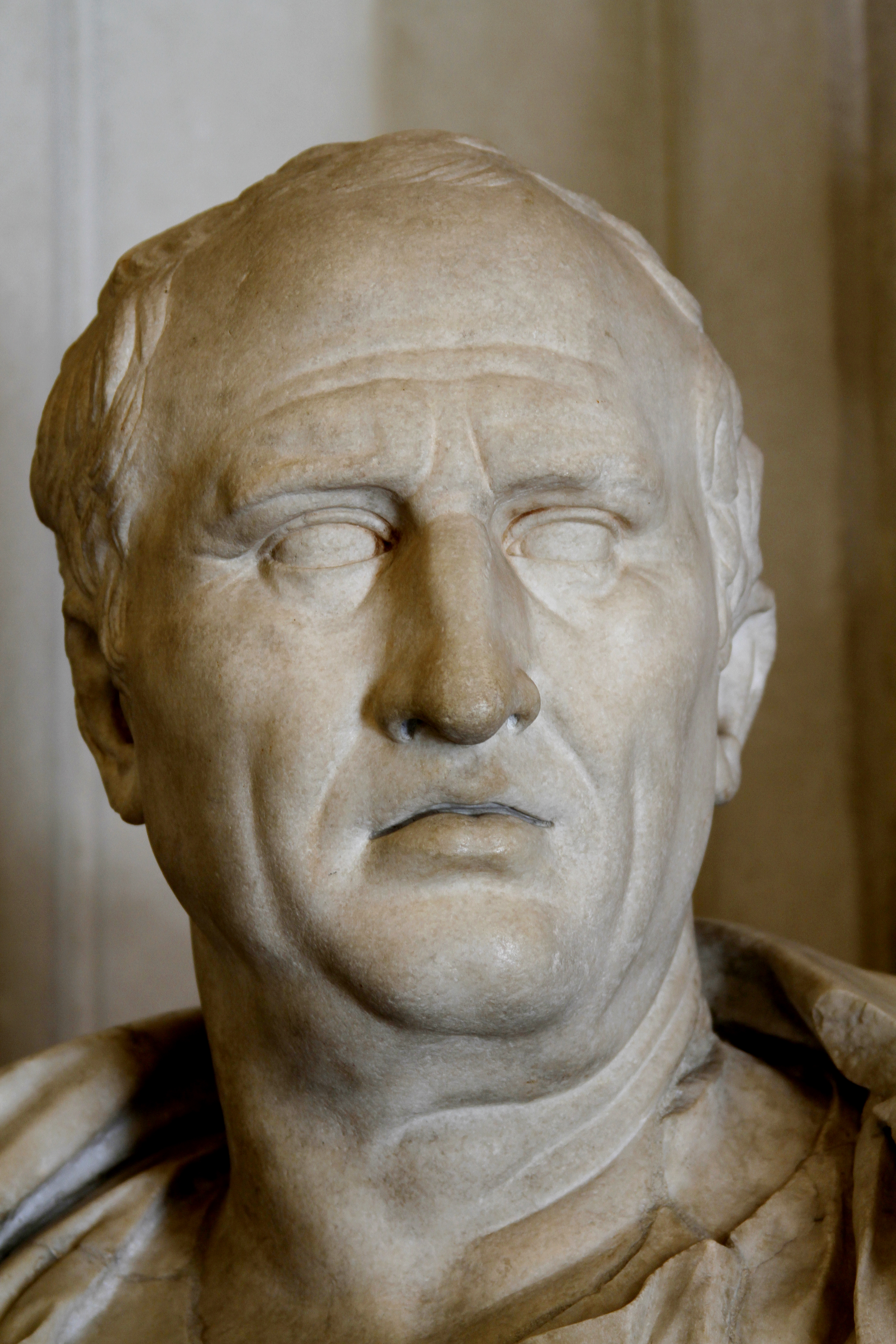
A 1st Century AD Bust of Cicero, the primary literary source on the Lex Hieronica

The main source for the provisions of the Lex Hieronica comes from Cicero's In Verrem. Other primary sources, such as Appian, Polybius and Livy, claim that there was an agricultural tithe in Sicily. These authors contribute to the debate concerning when the Lex Hieronica was established. However, In Verrem is the only primary source which gives a detailed account of the provisions or refers to the Lex Hieronica directly. In some instances Cicero refers to a provision pertaining to tax collection to the edict of Verres. These include a praetor's edict setting forth the laws of the praetor's area of jurisdiction, the praetorship of Sicily being rotated annually. Each praetor introduced his own edict. However, it was customary for a praetor's edict to conform to previous edicts. Unfortunately, it is difficult to determine whether or not a provision pertaining to tax collection from the edict of Verres is a continuation of the Lex Hieronica or a new regulation. This is due to the fact that one of Cicero's charges against Verres was that he interfered with the taxation practises. For this reason, further evidence must be sought if a provision from the edict of Verres is to be treated as a provision of the Lex Hieronica.

=== Archaeological ===
Archaeological excavations in the Sicilian town of Morgantina, a town within the Kingdom of Syracuse, have uncovered three buildings connected to the Lex Hieronica: two large granaries and a public office. The buildings date to the time of the rule of Hiero II. All three of the buildings have been found in the agora of Morgantina. For this reason, the buildings were most likely all public buildings. The two excavated granaries have been named the Eastern and Western Granaries. The Eastern Granary belongs to the architectural style which was prevalent in the rule of Hiero II. The Eastern Granary is estimated to have been 92.85 metres long and 7.60 metres wide. This space was subdivided into six rooms, with administrative offices located at the northern end and vast storage facilities consisting of the southern halls which measure ca. 20 and ca. 40 metres in length. The format of this building was deemed to be effective and successful to be continued on in use under Roman occupation. This is apparent as its style was used as a model for the building of other Roman granaries, such as that built by Scipio Aemilius in Numantia in 134 BCE. In comparison, the Western Granary lacked the same monumental scope that was evident in the Eastern Granary. The Western Granary's size is more difficult to determine as its southern end was completely destroyed in the 17th century by the construction of a farmhouse. However, excavations have landed on the conclusion it was likely 32.90 metres wide and 7.50 metres wide. This granary had a single door and a ramp leading up to it on its short, northern end.

== Provisions ==
The Lex Hieronica was an agricultural tax on all Sicilian farmers, except those in the territory of the cities of Centuripa, Halesa, Segesta, Halyciae, and Panormus, Tauromenium and Messana. The latter two cities were exempted from the tax due to their status as civitas foederata. The other cities were exempted from the tithe due to their status as free states immune from tax but not with foederata.

The Lex Hieronica required that each farmer pay ten percent of their produce as tax in the form of a tithe. An extra tithe could be imposed when necessary. This tithe applied to farmers who produced corn and barley. In addition, it is likely that the tithe also applied to wine, oil, and other minor agricultural products. The tithe could either be paid in kind or in cash. The number of farmers had to be annually logged in official records. Modern reconstruction suggests that these records took the form of a three columned table which logged the name of the farmer, the amount of crops sown, and the amount contributed to the tithe respectively. These public records were likely stored in a public building of the sort discovered at Morgantina.

The Roman senate sold the rights to collect the Sicilian tithe to contractors. The tithe collectors were known as decumani. Usually, only Sicilians could purchase the rights to become decumani. However, occasionally there were Italian decumani in Sicily. The rights to collect were sold annually at an auction. Prior to 75 BCE the auctions were held in Syracuse. In 75 BCE the consuls Lucius Octavius and Gaius Aurelius Cotta moved the site of the auctions to Rome, except those contracts concerning grain. The collection rights were specific to a crop and a region of Sicily. The rights to collect the tithe of a crop were paid for in kind. For example, the right to collect grain was paid for with grain. However, Cicero also claims that the contracts could be bought with a monetary equivalent. Finally, Cicero suggests that the collector received an additional 6 percent of the produce which he was responsible for collecting.

The price of the collection rights was determined based on records of previous harvest and the professiones of the farmers. A professio was a declaration concerning the amount of seed which had been sown. The collector and the farmer were required to come to an informal personal agreement, a pactio, concerning the total produce and hence the amount of produce which the farmer had to pay. The edict of Verres required that this must take place on the threshing floor. It is likely that this edict did not differ from the requirements of the Lex Hieronica as Cicero charges Verres with only abusing this practise. The determination of the total produce would be too difficult in the field itself due to thickness of the crop. However, the true amount of produce could easily be hidden if assessment took place in the granary. Once collected, the grain tithe would have been stored in public grannies, like those uncovered at Morgantina.

The edict of Verres also required the tithe to be delivered to the waterside by a specific date, the first of August. The Lex Hieronica probably contained a similar requirement as harvests would have been gathered in early July. Furthermore, Cicero seems to suggest that Verres was not wrong to demand delivery by the first of August, rather his abuse of the farmers would have made such delivery impossible. It is unclear whether the collector or the farmer was responsible for delivering the tax to the waterside. On the one hand, Cicero never claims that the farmers were manipulated on the basis of such a responsibility. Furthermore, Cicero mentions no case of a farmer actually making a delivery. On the other hand, the language with which Cicero describes Septicus, a mistreated farmer in Sicily, suggests that the farmer was responsible. Once at the waterside the tithe would then be distributed to the army, to the garrison in Sicily or to Rome for private sale. Transport contractors were responsible for shipping. Whether or not transport contractors were the tax collectors is unclear.

Strict penalties applied to both the collectors and the farmers for violation. The Lex Hieronica established special courts in order to mediate disputes between the collectors and the farmers. The disputes that the court mediated likely concerned the failure of the two parties to come to an agreement on the threshing floor concerning the amount of tax owed. In the edict of Verres, the collector could be sued for eight times the amount wrongly exacted, whereas the farmer could be sued for no more than four times the amount wrongly withheld.

Cicero mentions that the edict of Verres had a provision referring to a public official known as the magistratus siculus. It is likely that the magistratus siculus was also a provision of the Lex Hieronica. This is due to the fact that Cicero charges Verres for using the magistrate as a tool for intimidating the farmer, not with implementing the magistracy itself. Cicero is ambiguous about the role of the magistratus siculus. Cicero states each of the tax paying cities had a magistratus siculus who served as an arbiter between farmers and the collectors when they had to agree on the amount of grain due. Cicero also mentions magistrates, without the adjective siculus, who were responsible for: annually recording the names of the farmers who had sown seeds, the amount in seeds sown by each and, how much tithe each farmer had paid after the harvest. Modern scholars have argued that these magistrates are the magistratus siculus. Furthermore, modern scholars have argued that that magistratus siculus occupied a public office like the one uncovered at Morgantina. This is due to the fact that the magistratus siculus was responsible for the public documents which were likely to have been stored in the public office.

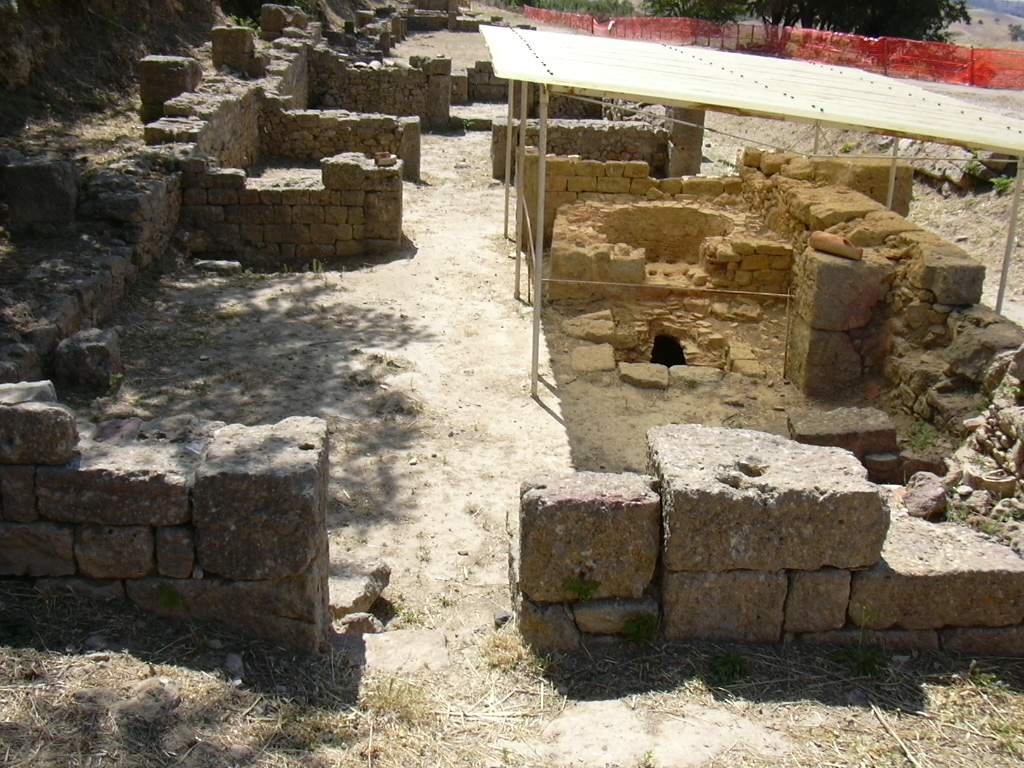
Archeological remains of a granary at Morgantina

== Precedents ==
When Rome annexed Sicily in 241 BCE, it became Rome's first overseas territory. As such, Rome had no precedents concerning overseas territorial management. The institutions which Rome developed in order to manage Sicily, as consistent with Roman practise elsewhere, grew out of the local governance structures which pre-dated Roman presence. The Lex Hieronica was no exception. Precedents for the Lex Hieronica, as pictured in Cicero's In Verrem, can be found in both Carthaginian Sicily and in the kingdom of Sicily, ruled by Hiero II.

The Carthaginians had taxed their subjects in Sicily for centuries with an agricultural tithe. Polybius reports that Rome was both physically and economically exhausted at the end of the first Punic war. For this reason, it seems reasonable that Romans would have sought to recuperate through the existing tax structures. Comparatively, after conquering the port city of Lilybaeum, the Romans left in place the existing Carthaginian tariffs. For this reason, it is plausible that the Romans left other taxes in place after their initial conquest.

King Hiero the II of Syracuse had a lucrative tax system in place over his subjects. Like in Carthaginian Sicily, Hiero II charged his subjects with an agricultural tithe. The tithe was likely stored in public granaries like those discovered at Morgantina. Roman appropriation of Hiero's taxation system is evident in archaeological remains at Morgantina which show that the public office continued to be utilised during Roman rule. Furthermore, Cicero tells us that the Romans had never changed local taxation systems of Sicily until Verres' corrupt praetorship. This is likely to be an exaggeration. However, it seems likely that if the Romans had removed any tax burdens then Cicero would have used this instance of Roman magnanimity to further demonstrate Verres' corruption. Given the presence of a tithe in Punic Sicily and the kingdom of Syracuse, it seems likely that the Sicilians had always paid a tithe. The primary change which the Romans made to the Sicilian taxation systems was that the tithe now was now paid to Rome, rather than Carthage or to Hiero.

=== Hiero II and Ptolemaic taxation ===
It has been argued that Hiero II's taxation system was influenced by Ptolemy II Philadelphus' revenue laws as these systems bear many structural similarities. Like Hiero's taxation system, the Ptolemaic revenue laws also required an agricultural tithe and annually renewed tax collectors. Both systems placed emphasis on record keeping, with Cicero's In Verrem demonstrating documented taxation. It is further evident this occurred in Egypt as well, with signed copies of agreements being held by all parties to an exchange. Both systems employed a recognised area where taxation agreements were discussed and formed between the farmer and collector. In Egypt this took place around the wine press, a practice that is embodied in Syracuse, as discussions took place on the threshing room floor. Further, both systems employ a degree of civic regulation and had mechanisms of referring disputes to civic actors such as the city magistrates in Syracuse, and in Egypt the issues being referred to the chief financial officers or "nome".

Whilst many similarities are evident, it has conversely been argued that the basic principles and underlying spirit of the two systems remained completely different. This is supported by notable differences within the systems. For example, the Ptolemaic system used royal officials to collect the tax, whereas the Lex Hieronica allowed that any Sicilian could collect the tax, provided they could afford the rights.

== Date of establishment ==
At some point, the Romans decided to codify the local taxation systems under the Lex Hieronica and implement them across Sicily. However, it is impossible to exactly date the establishment of the Lex Hieronica. No primary source explicitly names the Lex Hieronica other than Cicero. Cicero does not explicitly date when the Lex Hieronica was codified or implemented. Rather, any date concerning the establishment of the Lex Hieronica must be derived from indirect evidence.

Some scholars suggest that the Lex Hieronica was only implemented after 210 BCE. In 210 BCE Valerius Laevinus led an army against Syracuse due its defection to Carthage during the second Punic war and conquered the city. Then, in order to recuperate from war losses, the Romans would have immediately adopted the already existing taxation system which had been in place since Hiero II and extended the tax across Sicily. This interpretation makes sense of the fact that Laevinus then encouraged the Sicilians who had been displaced from their farms during the war, to start farming again.

There are several sources which suggest that the Romans taxed their Sicilian subjects prior to 210 BCE. Polybius suggests that in 251 BC the Romans were cooperating with their Sicilian allies in the extraction of an agricultural tithe in Panormos. This was not a regular tithe implemented across the whole of Sicily per the Lex Hieronica. However, this shows that the Romans were at least familiar with local practices of taxation prior as early as 251 BCE. Furthermore, Rome conquered Panormos in 254 BCE. Hence, it is possible that Rome was at least familiar with local practises as early as 254 BCE. Appian claims that after the first Punic war, the Sicilians under Roman rule were subjected to an agricultural tithe. In the same passage, Appian states that Rome also sent a praetor to Sicily in 241 BCE. However, other sources contradict this claiming that the first Sicilian praetor arrived in 227 BCE. This does not necessarily invalidate Appian's claims about the implementation of the tithe. Further evidence for 241 BCE from Cicero. Cicero reports that the Sicilian city Segesta was declared to be free from tax because of their claimed kinship to Aeneas. In 241 BCE the Segetians began minting coins depicting Aeneas. If these two events coincide, then, there must have been a tax to be exempted from in 241 BCE. Similarly, in 213 BCE, the Sicilian city Tauromenium was made a civitas foederata. Hence, it was declared to be free from paying an agricultural tithe. Therefore, there must have been an agricultural tax to be exempted from in Sicily prior to 213 BCE. Finally, Livy claims that all the Sicilians had paid tax to Rome in kind prior to 218 BC, the outbreak of the second Punic war. These sources suggest that Rome imposed an agricultural tithe on some of its Sicilian subjects prior to the second Punic war. However, it remains impossible to determine when the Romans appropriated Hiero's taxation system or when it was applied to all of Sicily.

== The Lex Hieronica and the Roman military ==
The Lex Hieronica main purpose was to address Rome's changing military logistics. The First Punic War presented Rome with the dilemma on how it could sustain its manpower long term in foreign wars far from the Italian mainland. With an increasing need for supplies away from Rome, legislation like the Lex Hieronica, which presented a reliable tithe of one tenth of Sicilian grain supply, solved this issue during Rome's time of imperial expansion. The tithe from Sicily was used to feed Roman garrisons on the island and to feed Roman armies overseas. Livy recounts an example of this, when he writes about Sicily sending the Roman army in Macedonia food and clothing in 198 BCE. Additionally to military supply, there is some modern speculation about whether the city of Rome itself received a portion of the Sicilian tithe.

There is a strong possibility that some of the grain was sent to the capital, given ancient accounts of the desperate need for grain in Rome. Further evidence for this comes from ancient and modern sources correlating years of large grain supply being sent to Rome in the same year with years that Sicily had an unusually large harvests. Despite this, Sicily's tithe definitely served a primarily military purpose, but these observations stimulate discussion for future debates on other uses of the spoils of the Lex Hieronica.

== The Lex Hieronica and Roman politics ==
The Lex Hieronica was also a key political and cultural instrument in the development of the concept of a provincia and the framework of territorial administration. A provincia was an area of Roman responsibility and a place where Roman imperialism was recognised and obeyed. The need for extra protection and regulation in Sicily stemmed from its role as a bridge between Rome and Carthage. Although the Romans drove Carthage from Sicily and its surrounding islands after their victory in the first Punic War, the enduring proximity of Carthaginian forces across the sea created a unique volatility in Sicily that required special attention.

The descriptions of the Sicilians in Cicero's In Verrem portray the unusually close alliance that formed out of Rome's new provincial administration. Cicero describes Sicily as "a valuable assistant both in war and peace" and praises his ancestors for "defending the Sicilians and retaining their allegiance." In describing the crimes of Verres, Cicero expands further, speaking of the victimised farmers of Sicily as a "virtuous and honest and honourable class of men." He then addresses the Lex Hieronica regulations as "respectful" towards their important role as the "cultivators of soil." The intimacy of Roman-Sicilian relations portrayed by Cicero reflects Lex Hieronica's role in establishing a cohesive framework for integrating foreign lands into the Roman system as a provincia, without destroying the integrity of their own cultures.

Whilst Cicero is able to construct his oratory around a bond of closeness and respect within the Roman and Sicilian relationship, the political and cultural context behind this bond is necessary to grasp the purpose of the Lex Hieronica. Beyond the portrayal of intimate relations between Sicily and Rome dictated by Cicero, it is principally clear that the Romans sought to implement an effective system that was going to serve its own primary and immediate needs. These immediate needs are described to us as being to feed its men and thus a continuation of the tithes in Sicily would resolve this need. It has been contended that the system was most likely born of out of the notion it made sense merely to continue agricultural tithes and continue a taxation system that had self-evidenced success and unprecedented levels of prosperity historically. Rome's decision to integrate the already existing systems such as Heiro's tax regime aided in the construction of their own image in the eyes of the Sicilian people, as through their conservation of the past they constantly reminded the Sicilians of the generosity of the conqueror.

Thus the integration of Sicilian taxation systems, into the Roman taxation method can be seen in differing ways. Drawing on Cicero's In Verrem, it is apparent that he characterises this creation of law under respect of heritage and culture. However historians have also countered that this must be considered against the backdrop of the benefits this held for Rome, in acting as a stabilising and self serving tool.

== Comparison with other Roman taxation systems ==
The Sicilian provincial taxation system was in many ways unique and differs from taxation methods employed in other provinces. For instance, the Tribune Gaius Gracchus introduced a grain tithe to the province of Asia in 123. However, unlike in Sicily, the tithe contracts were not leased out to local contractors by the Quaestor within the province. Instead, the Asian tithe contracts were leased out by the censors in Rome to companies of Roman tax-collectors. Later, Julius Caesar abolished the leasing of tax-collection contracts in Rome, and instead placed responsibility for raising the tax in the hands of the provincial communities. This change was motivated by the prevalence of extortion by the tax-collectors. Each city would raise the amount required by whatever means they determined, which would then contribute to a joint payment by the entire province. Grain tithes continued to be exacted from Asia until at least the reign of the emperor Nero, however at some point later on it was replaced with a monetary tax based on both the quantity and quality of land, rather than the yield.

Taxation in other Roman provinces often involved the exaction of a fixed sum called the stipendiarum, in general it was up to the community to raise the sum by whatever means they determined, and then hand it over to the provincial governor. The stipendiarum could consist of grain, money, or sometimes both. The provinces of Spain are known to have been taxed in this manner after the rates of taxation were fixed by the governor Tiberius Gracchus in 180, and the 600,000 denarii exacted by M. Marcellus from the Celtiberians in 151-2 is thought to represent the regular payment made in that region. The main difference between the stipendiarum and the grain tithe of Sicily, was that seeing as the stipendiarum was a fixed sum which remained the same from year to year, the amount taxed was not determined by the crops' yield and other such factors.

== See also ==
- Roman law
- List of Roman laws
