= Lex Caecilia de vectigalibus =

Roman law on customs and duties

The lex Caecilia de vectigalibus was a Roman law passed in 60 BC, and proposed by the praetor Caecilius Metellus Nepos, concerning the abolition of port duties in Italy.

The Senate wished to remove Nepos' name from the bill, and replace it with another, but this attempt failed.

== Background ==
The complaints against port duties were not so much against the tax itself, but against the behaviour of the publicani during their collections. Under Caesar taxes on imported commodities from overseas were reimposed.

== See also ==
- List of Roman laws
- Roman Law
