= Lex Aebutia de formulis =

Roman law on jurisdiction

Lex Aebutia de formulis (The Aebutian Law Concerning the Lawful Forms of Private Actions) was a law established in ancient Rome in around 150 BC, though the date is quite uncertain.

Introduced by the magistrate Sextus Aelius, this law greatly expanded the number of civil actions under the jurisdiction of the praetor. Primary sources are Gaius, Institutes 4.30 and Aulus Gellius 16.10.8.

== See also ==
- Roman law
- List of Roman laws
