= Lex Cornelia de maiestate =

Ancient Roman law

The Lex Cornelia de maiestate was a Roman law passed by Sulla during his dictatorship from 81 to 80 BC using the tribune Cornelius. The law, relating to the control of governors and their forces in the provinces, stated among other things that a governor could not leave his province during his time in office, with or without his army. The law was designed to prevent both corruption and rebellion of governors, but was thwarted just four years later in 77 BC during the revolt of Lepidus, a rogue proconsul who left his province of Cisalpine Gaul with his army and marched towards Rome.

== See also ==
- Roman law
- List of Roman laws
- Constitutional Reforms of Lucius Cornelius Sulla
