= Lex Cassia de senatu =

Ancient Roman law

The lex Cassia de senatu was a Roman law, introduced in 104 BC by the tribune L. Cassius Longinus. The law excluded from the senate individuals who had been deprived of imperium by popular vote or had been convicted of a crime in a popular assembly (Judicium Populi).

== Background ==
The law was a move to restrain the discretionary power of the Senate. It was seen as reinforcing the voice of the Roman people. The provision on magistrates stripped of their imperium was a deliberate attack against Quintus Servilius Caepio, proconsul in 105 BC, whose imperium was removed after the disaster of Arausio.

== See also ==
- List of Roman laws
- Roman Law
