= Lex Acilia Repetundarum =

Roman law on jury selection

The Lex Acilia Repetundarum was a law established in ancient Rome in 123 BC.

It provides for members of the equestrian order (Latin equites) as jurors in courts overseeing the senatorial class to prevent corruption abroad. Equites who gained tax contracts or presided over courts could not, unlike senators, be prosecuted for extortion. The law was extremely unpopular in the Senate since it subjected the senatorial class to the inferior equestrian. It was believed to be part of Gaius Gracchus' measures, even though it did not carry his name, suggesting that Gaius carried his chief judicial act in another tribune's name. Cicero implies in his first Verrine Oration that the measure was the work of the father of Manius Acilius Glabrio, the praetor in charge of the extortion courts in 70 BC.

== See also ==
- Roman Law
- List of Roman laws
- Gens Acilia
