= Acceptilatio =

In Ancient Roman civil law, acceptilatio is defined to be a release by mutual interrogation between debtor and creditor, by which each party is exonerated from the same contract. In other words, acceptilatio is the form of words by which a creditor releases his debtor from a debt or obligation, and acknowledges he has received that which in fact he has not received (veluti imaginaria solutio). It is equivalent to the modern acceptilation.

This release of debt by acceptilatio applies only to such debts as have been contracted by stipulatio, conformably to a rule of Roman law that only contracts made by words can be ended by words. But the astuteness of the Roman lawyers found a mode of complying with the rule, and at the same time extending the acceptilatio to all kinds and to any number of contracts. This was the invention of Gallus Aquilius, who devised a formula for reducing all and every kind of contracts to the stipulatio. This being done, the acceptilatio would immediately apply, inasmuch as the matter was by such formula brought within the general rule of law above mentioned.

The acceptilatio must be absolute and not conditional. A part of a debt or obligation might be released as well as the whole, provided the thing was in its nature capable of division. A pupillus could not release a debt by acceptilatio, without the auctoritas of his tutor, but he could be released from a debt. A woman also could not release a debt by stipulatio without the auctoritas of a tutor. The phrase by which a creditor is said to release his debtor by acceptilatio is debitori acceptum, or accepto facere or ferre, or acceptum habere. When anything which was done on the behalf of or for the state, such as a building for instance, was approved by the competent authorities, it was said, in acceptum ferri, or referri.

== See also ==
- Roman Law
