= Gaius Antius Restio =

Tribune of the plebs in 68 BC

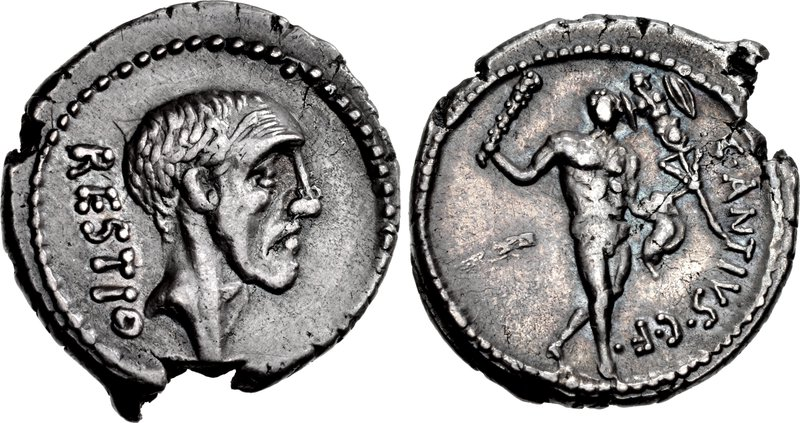
Portrait of Gaius Antius Restio on a denarius minted by his son in 47 BC. The reverse with Hercules alludes to the mythical origin of the family.

Gaius Antius Restio (fl. 68–53 BC) was a politician of the Roman Republic. He is principally known for the lex Antia sumptuaria, a law against luxury he passed as tribune of the plebs in 68 BC. This law forbade magistrates from attending banquets, in an attempt to contain political corruption. One of the few sources on Restio's life is a poem of his contemporary Catullus, telling that he was an enemy of Publius Sestius, a politician and good friend of Cicero.

== Life ==
Restio was a homo novus ("new man"), the first of his family to enter the Senate. He belonged to an obscure plebeian gens, which only emerged in the second half of the second century BC, with a Marcus Antius Briso, tribune of the plebs in 137. Like several other Roman families inventing mythical origins, the Antii claimed descent from Hercules through his son Antiades. Modern scholars have suggested they came from Minturnae, or Lanuvium, both Latin cities south of Rome.

=== Lex Antia (68 BC) ===
Between 82 and 80, the conservative dictator Sulla amended the constitution of the Roman Republic, notably by curtailing the powers of the tribunes of the plebs. In 70, the consul Pompey restored the tribunes' former prerogatives, which they used to push for radical legislation, especially against political corruption and malpractices. Restio was elected tribune in this context, and took office on 10 December 69.

During his office, Restio passed the Lex Antia sumptuaria, the last of a long list of sumptuary laws passed during the Roman Republic. The terms of the law are not known except that it forbade magistrates from accepting invitations to attend banquets. This ban closed a loophole in the previous legislation, which still permitted magistrates to use friends as surrogate organisers of political banquets. The law was likely directed at politicians who campaigned through extravagant banquets at the time, such as Quintus Hortensius (consul in 69) and Lucius Lucullus (consul in 74), whose private luxury was proverbial. Restio then refused to attend any banquet in order to stay true to his beliefs.

=== In Catullus 44 ===
Catullus 44

O my farm, whether Sabine or Tiburtine
(for they say that you're Tiburtine, they for whom it is not pleasing
to harm Catullus; but they for whom it is pleasing
assert that you are Sabine by any wager),
but whether Sabine or more truly Tiburtine,
I was gladly in your suburban villa
and I expelled a bad cough from my chest,
which my stomach gave to me, not undeserving,
while I seek a lavish dinner:
for, while I wish to be a Sestian guest,
I read the speech “Against the Candidate
Antius”, full of poison and pestilence.
At this point, a chilling illness and persistent cough
shook me continually, until I fled to your embrace,
and I restored myself both by leisure and nettle (an herb).
Therefore I, cured, give my highest
thanks to you, because you have not punished my mistake.
So I pray, if I again pick up the malicious
writings of Sestius, that their chill bring an
illness and cough not upon me, but rather upon Sestius himself,
he who invites me only when I have read his bad book.

— Catullus, translated by Wikisource

Publius Sestius, a friend of Cicero, is described by Catullus in one of his poems as having made a violent speech against Restio, while the latter was said to be a petitor. (Note: Catullus, 44.) This word can be translated as a candidate for an election, or a plaintiff during a trial, although the former meaning is favoured in modern publications. If the second meaning (petitor as plaintiff) is considered true, it would likely mean that Restio sued Sestius for breaking the lex Antia. Sestius is also described as hosting lavish banquets, hence his enmity towards Restio. The modern historian Francis Ryan suggests that Restio is the one described running for election in 54 or 53 in a letter of Cicero. (Note: Cicero, ad Atticum, iv. 17.) As he is mentioned alongside his political allies Marcus Porcius Cato and Marcus Favonius—both known for their asceticism like him—Restio either aimed at becoming the colleague of Cato as praetor in 54, or that of Favonius as aedile in 54 or 53. Restio apparently lost the elections, perhaps against Marcus Aufidius—a former tribune of the plebs elected alongside Favonius—who received the cognomen Lurco ("glutton" in Latin), a striking contrast with Restio's austerity. It was probably during this campaign between Restio and Lurco that Sestius' speech against Restio was pronounced.

Restio had a son, also named Gaius, who was triumvir monetalis in 47 and minted denarii bearing a portrait of his father. Restio's son was also a supporter of Julius Caesar during the Civil war against Pompey, but was later caught in the proscriptions of the Second Triumvirate in 43.

== Bibliography ==
=== Ancient sources ===
- Gaius Valerius Catullus, Poems (translation on Wikisource).
- Marcus Tullius Cicero, Letters to Atticus (translation by Evelyn Shirley Shuckburgh on Wikisource).

=== Modern sources ===
- T. Robert S. Broughton, The Magistrates of the Roman Republic, American Philological Association, 1951–1952.
- Michael Crawford, Roman Republican Coinage, Cambridge University Press, 1974, ISBN 978-0-521-07492-6.
- J. A. Crook, Andrew Lintott, Elizabeth Rawson (editors), The Cambridge Ancient History, vol. IX, The Last Age of the Roman Republic, 146-43 B.C., Cambridge University Press, 1992. ISBN 0-521-25603-8
- David B. George, "Catullus 44: The Vulnerability of Wanting to Be Included", The American Journal of Philology, Vol. 112, No. 2 (Summer, 1991), pp. 247–250.
- Erich S. Gruen, "Reviewed Work: New Men in the Roman Senate, 139 B.C.-14 A.D. by T. P. Wiseman", The Classical Journal, Vol. 69, No. 3 (Feb. – Mar. 1974), pp. 251–253.
- Andrew Lintott, "Electoral Bribery in the Roman Republic", The Journal of Roman Studies, Vol. 80 (1990), pp. 1–16.
- David Mulroy (editor), The Complete Poetry of Catullus, University of Wisconsin Press, 2002. ISBN 978-0-299-17774-4
- Chester Louis Neudling, A Prosopography to Catullus, Oxford, 1955.
- Francis X. Ryan, "Two Persons in Catullus", Giornale italiano di filologia, 48, 1996, pp. 85–91.
- Ronald Syme, "Ten Tribunes", The Journal of Roman Studies, 1963, Vol. 53, Parts 1 and 2 (1963), pp. 55–60.
