= Ballot laws of the Roman Republic =

Ancient Roman laws

The ballot laws of the Roman Republic (Latin: leges tabellariae) were four laws which introduced the secret ballot to all popular assemblies in the Republic. They were all introduced by tribunes, and consisted of the lex Gabinia tabellaria (or lex Gabinia) of 139 BC, applying to the election of magistrates; the lex Cassia tabellaria of 137 BC, applying to juries except in cases of treason; the lex Papiria of 131 BC, applying to the passing of laws; and the lex Caelia of 107 BC, which expanded the lex Cassia to include matters of treason. Prior to the ballot laws, voters announced their votes orally to a teller, essentially making every vote public. The ballot laws curtailed the influence of the aristocratic class and expanded the freedom of choice for voters. Elections became more competitive. In short, the secret ballot made bribery more difficult.

== Background ==
=== Political context ===
From the founding of the Roman Republic in 509 BC to the mid second century BC, Rome had expanded from a small city state to a world power. After decisively winning the Macedonian Wars, destroying Carthage in 146 BC, and destroying Corinth in the same year, Rome became the hegemonic power of the Mediterranean. Aside from controlling the Italian Peninsula, it had gained provinces in Iberia, Greece, Corsica, Sardinia, Sicily, and North Africa, in addition to its many client states and allies.

During this 400 year expansion, Roman politics was largely peaceful, with no civil wars and no recorded political murders. However, the conquest of an empire would cause significant political and social changes. With an empire, political office offered more opportunities for wealth and personal advancement, increasing the stakes of elections. The Italian land conquered by Rome—technically ager publicus, or public land—in practice fell into the hands of rich aristocrats, leading to the rise of large estates called latifundia. These large estates were worked by slaves from conquered territories, who flooded into Italy in the hundreds of thousands. Due to economies of scale, the use of slave labor, and the appropriation of previously public land, many small farmers found it impossible to compete with the latifundia and were forced to sell their farms. The dispossession of these farmers, many of whom moved to Rome and became part of the landless poor, caused profound social tension and political upheaval.

The 130s and 120s BC were a turning point for Roman politics. The ballot laws were introduced at a time of rising popular sentiment that saw the rise of populares politicians, who gained power by appealing to the lower classes. Most notably, these included Tiberius Gracchus in 133 BC and Gaius Gracchus a decade later. The resulting conflict between populares and optimates would lead to the dissolution of political norms and the rise of political violence. Within decades, mob violence, political assassination, and even civil war would become routine. These conflicts would cause the end of the republic in 27 BC. This extended period of unrest is termed the crisis of the Roman Republic.

=== Roman constitution ===
The constitution of the Roman Republic consisted of a complex mix of elected officials (magistrates), popular assemblies, and the Senate. The assemblies elected all magistrates, in addition to passing legislation and having some judicial functions. The magistrates had a wide range of duties, including leading armies, presiding over assemblies, judging cases, managing state finances, and managing public works. The Senate was the only deliberative body of the republic, and was composed of ex-magistrates appointed by a magistrate known as the censor. It nominally had largely advisory powers, but in practice its advice was almost always taken, and it was the predominant body in charge of foreign policy and the treasury.

The Republic had three popular assemblies: the Centuriate Assembly, Tribal Assembly, and Plebeian Council. The first elected the higher magistrates, including the two consuls, who held extensive powers over all Roman citizens and were commanders-in-chief of the army. The Tribal Assembly elected the lower magistrates: the quaestors, who managed state finances, and the curule aediles, responsible for public works. The Plebeian Council elected the plebeian tribunes and the plebeian aediles. The tribunes presided over the Plebeian Council, proposed legislation, and could veto the actions of all other magistrates. The plebeian aediles had a similar role to the curule aediles.

The Centuriate Assembly consisted of 193 groupings called centuries, each of which had one vote. The vote of a century was determined by the votes of the members of that century who were present to vote. Membership in a century was determined by a citizen's wealth, geographic location, and age (junior or senior). The centuries were heavily weighted in favor of the wealthy, so that the equites and first class, despite comprising a small portion of the population, were only 8 votes short of a majority of the centuries. Similarly, the landless proletarii, which might have made up 14% of the population, were allocated one century. The centuries voted by class, so that the wealthiest centuries voted first, followed by the less wealthy centuries, and so on. When a majority was reached, voting stopped. The poorer centuries, therefore, rarely had a chance to vote.

The Tribal Assembly was composed of groupings called tribes, where membership in a tribe was determined by geographic location and not, as the name implies, by ancestry. Each tribe had one vote, and the vote of a tribe was determined by the votes of the members. Unlike in the Centuriate Assembly, there is no property requirement. The Plebeian Assembly was similar to the Tribal Assembly, except that only plebeians were permitted, and it was presided by a plebeian tribune. The Plebeian Assembly eventually became the main legislative body of the republic.

In addition to their roles in electing magistrates and passing legislation, the Tribal and Plebeian assemblies could try judicial cases. The Centuriate Assembly also served as the court of highest appeal, especially for capital cases.

In summary, Rome had a mixed constitution, with monarchic, oligarchic, and democratic elements represented by the senior magistrates, the Senate, and the assemblies respectively. The ancient Greek writer Polybius wrote that at the time of the Second Punic War, the aristocratic element was dominant in Rome. Even so, the people of Rome (populus romanus) held important practical and theoretical standing in the Roman state. Only the people, as represented by the assemblies, could elect magistrates, declare war, or try capital cases. In the second century BC, the assemblies would pass important laws on a wide range of issues, including citizenship, finance, social matters, religion, and war and peace. Voting by the Roman people, therefore, was critical to the functioning of the Republic. It was necessary not only for elections, but also for legislative and judicial reasons.

== Voting before the ballot laws ==
Before the ballot laws were introduced, votes were conducted by voice. Voters in a certain century or tribe would gather together in a venue and express their preference, one by one, to a teller (rogator). The teller would tabulate the votes and announce the result to the presiding official. Votes were therefore impossible to keep secret.

Although there are few recorded instances of direct voter intimidation, a variety of social pressures reduced voter freedom. For example, both centuries and tribes were based on geographic location, so voters voted with the people most likely to know them. The rogator himself was a man of distinction, such as a Senator. Voters might be reluctant to offend their family, their landlords, or their military commanders. More significantly, Rome had a strong system of patronage. In this system, a wealthy patron would support his less wealthy client with food, money, business advice, and legal assistance. In exchange, the client would grant the patron favours in his personal and public life. One of the most significant was political support, which included campaigning for the patron and voting for him in elections.

Another major source of influence was largess (largitio), also called ambitus. In an attempt to buy votes, candidates would hold lavish banquets and games, or even directly bribe voters with wine, oil, or money. For example, Titus Annius Milo, when canvassing for the consulate in 53 BC, promised each voter in the tribes 1000 asses. In the course of the second century BC, a long series of laws were passed to crack down on ambitus. This included the lex Orchia of 182 BC, which restricted the amount one could spend on banquets, and the lex Baebia one year later, aimed at directly combating ambitus. Despite Plutarch's claim that the giving of gifts in exchange for votes was punishable by death, these laws appeared to have little effect.

== Ballot laws ==
The ballot laws were not the first election laws to be passed. Due to the apparent ineffectiveness of the anti-corruption lex Baebia of 181 BC, the Cornelian-Fulvian law of 159 BC was passed, again targeting corruption. Extending the sumptuary law (lex Orchia) of 182 BC, the lex Didia of 143 BC restricted spending on banquets in all of Italy. In 145 BC, a bill by the tribune Lucius Licinius Crassus proposed that priesthoods be elected instead of co-opted. While advocating for his proposal, he pointedly turned his back on the senators in the comitium and spoke directly to the people in the Roman Forum.

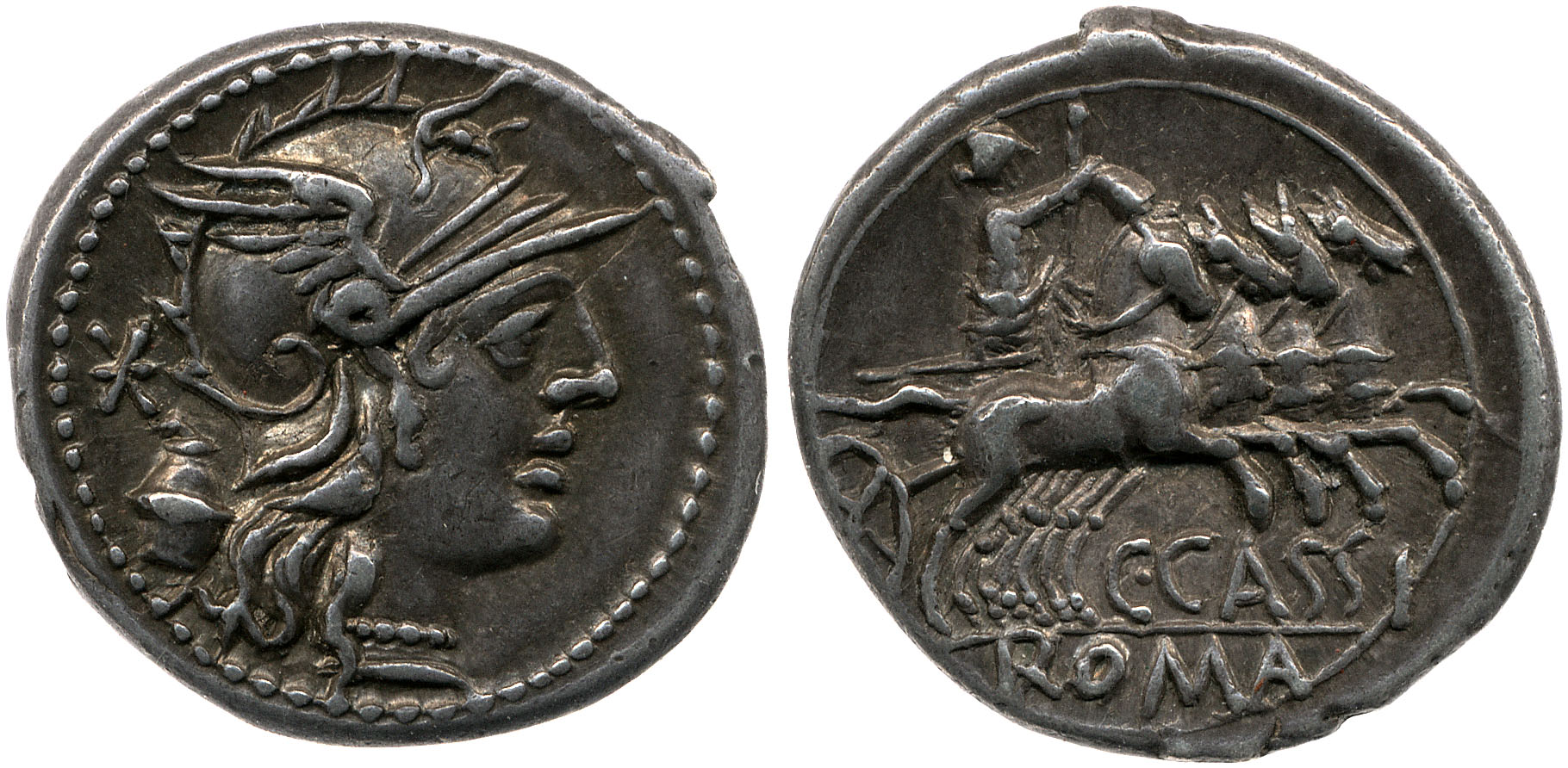
Obverse: the head of Libertas, the Roman goddess of liberty. On the lower left is a ballot urn. Reverse: A personification of Libertas in a chariot, holding the cap (pileus) and staff (vindicta) of freedom. This coin was struck by C Cassius around 126 BC and commemorates the Lex Cassia tabellaria of 137 BC, which mandated the use of the secret ballot for all trials in the popular assemblies with the exception of treason cases.

The only detailed ancient account of the ballot laws is Cicero's De Legibus (III. 33–9). Written in the last years of the Republic, De legibus is a fictional dialogue between Cicero, his brother Quintus, and their mutual friend Atticus. In the dialogue, the three discuss their conception of the ideal Roman constitution. In Book III 33–9, Cicero summarizes the passage of the ballot laws; the three subsequently criticize the laws and propose repeal or alteration. Cicero, an opponent of the laws, portrays the sponsors of the ballot laws as demagogues currying favor with the masses.

The ballot laws were highly controversial and strongly opposed by the optimates. Pliny remarks:

You remember, no doubt, having often read what commotions were occasioned by the ballot law (lex tabellaria), and how much its author was both approved and condemned.

=== lex Gabinia tabellaria ===
The first ballot law (the lex Gabinia tabellaria) was introduced in 139 BC for the election of magistrates by the tribune Aulus Gabinius, whom Cicero called "an unknown and sordid agitator". The law mandated a secret ballot for the election of magistrates in all assemblies. Gabinius, the first person of that name known to hold political office in Rome, was from a family that had low-status (possibly slave origins) in Cales, and was able to enter politics due to the military success of his father.

The reasons behind the law are unclear, as are the circumstances surrounding its passage. It is thought that this law was adopted following the acquittal that Lucius Aurelius Cotta obtained by corrupting the judges in 138 BC. According to the Cambridge Ancient History, the law was undoubtedly justified as giving freedom to the people, but may also have been intended to curb bribery of voters by candidates. Ursula Hall believes that the law "was undoubtedly largely supported by men of substance wanting to challenge aristocratic control of office. In purpose this law was not, in a modern sense, 'democratic', not designed to give more power to voters, much less candidates, from lower ranks in the Roman system." Hall and Harris both claim because literacy was uncommon in ancient Rome and the written ballot would have required literacy, the Gabinian law must have restricted voting to a small and prosperous minority, with Harris suggesting that this was intentional. However, Alexander Yakobson argues that the Gabinian law was a genuine piece of popular legislation benefiting a broad section of the electorate. He points out that the law applied just as much to the Tribal Assembly, which had no property qualification, as it did to the Centuriate Assembly. He also claims that the level of literacy necessary for voting was low as voters only had to write the initials of the preferred candidate. The assumption that literacy was low is itself controversial. In fact, Edward Best flipped the argument around, using the ballot laws as evidence that literacy was widespread in Rome. Subsequent improvements or extensions to the law were the lex Papiria(131 BC), the lex Maria and lex Caelia (107 BC), all aimed at limiting corruption. Together these laws are called leges tabellariae.

=== lex Cassia tabellaria ===
The second law was introduced by Lucius Cassius Longinus Ravilla in 137 BC. It extended the secret ballot for trials in the popular assembly. It mandated the secret ballot for judicial votes, with the exception of cases on treason. The passing of the law was resisted by the tribune Marcus Antius Briso who threatened to apply his veto, with the support of one of the consuls of the year. The threat of veto was unusual, since it was not customary for it to be applied on matters held to be in the plebeians' interest. Briso was apparently dissuaded from actually applying the veto by Scipio Aemilianus, perhaps displaying populares sentiments.

Cassius was a noble Plebeian who would become consul in 127 BC and censor in 125 BC. Cicero writes of the opposition to this law:

[this law] was long opposed by the tribune of the plebs M. Antius Briso with the help of M. Lepidus the consul, and it became a matter of reproach to Publius Africanus that Briso was believed to have withdrawn his opposition to it through the influence of Africanus.

In his speech Pro Sestio, he further comments that "A ballot law was proposed by Lucius Cassius. The people thought that their liberty was at stake. The leaders of the State held a different opinion; in a matter that concerned the safety of the optimates, they dreaded the impetuosity of the masses and the licence afforded by the ballot."

133 BC was a turning point in Roman politics, marking the beginning of the crisis of the Roman Republic. In that year, Tiberius Gracchus was elected tribune and forced through a land redistribution law without consulting the Senate and against the veto of another tribune—both of which violated custom, if not the law. At the end of the year, he sought re-election, breaking another unwritten rule forbidding consecutive terms. While the assembly was voting, a group of senators beat Tiberius to death, along with more than 300 of his supporters. This act of violence marked the first instance of political bloodshed in Republican history, and was considered especially egregious because the person of a tribune was sacrosanct.

=== lex Papiria ===
The third ballot law was introduced in 131 BC by Gaius Papirius Carbo, and applied to the ratification and repeal of legislation—which, by this point, was mainly the duty of the Plebeian Council. Carbo, called a "rabble-rouser" by Cicero, was at the time on the land commission charged with implementing Tiberius Gracchus' land redistribution law. Pointing to this association, Hall argues that unlike the earlier lex Gabinia, the lex Papiria was undoubtedly passed in the interests of popular reform.

Serious political violence would erupt again with the rise of another populares tribune--Gaius Gracchus, the brother of Tiberius Gracchus. In both 123 BC and 122 BC, Gaius was elected tribune of the people. He proposed a series of popular laws, far more wide-ranging than those of his brother. These included an extension to Tiberius' land redistribution bill; a grain subsidy for poorer citizens; reforms to the judicial system; the free issue of clothes and equipment to soldiers; the founding of overseas colonies to help the landless; a reduction in the length of military service; and citizenship for Italian allies. In 121 BC, after Gaius failed re-election, one of his supporters killed an attendant of the consul Lucius Opimius. A confrontation ensued between the Gaius and the Senate, which quickly turned violent after the Senate urged the overthrow of Gaius. The consul rallied a militia, and together with Cretan archers who happened to be near the city, attacked Gaius and his supporters. Gaius committed suicide rather than be captured, and Opimius subsequently executed 3000 of his supporters.

The first three ballot laws were apparently not perfectly effective, as they were followed by a series of further laws enforcing the secrecy of the ballot. In 119 BC, the tribune Gaius Marius introduced a law that narrowed the causeway leading to the ballot box, in order to prevent non-voters from standing on the causeway and intimidating voters. The law was passed despite vigorous Senate opposition. The other secrecy-enforcing laws are not explicitly mentioned by ancient sources, but Cicero indicates their existence by proposing to abolish:

all the laws, passed thereafter [after the ballot laws], which ensure the secrecy of the ballot in every possible way, providing that no one shall look at a ballot, and that no one shall question or accost the voters. The Marian Law even made the passages (pontes) narrow.

Yakobson views this passage as evidence that these laws were effective at ensuring the secrecy of the ballot, which explains why Cicero, an opponent of the ballot laws, proposed to abolish them. As additional evidence, he points out that there is no record of any further attempts to violate the secrecy of the ballot after the Marian law.

=== lex Coelia tabellaria ===
The fourth and final law was introduced in 107 BC by the tribune Gaius Coelius Caldus, and expanded the Cassian law to cases of treason. In 107 BC, a Roman army under the consul Lucius Cassius Longinus was dealt a crushing defeat by the Tigurini at the Battle of Burdigala. His legate Gaius Popilius Laenas negotiated a humiliating agreement to save the lives of the soldiers. The agreement was considered unacceptable at Rome, and Coelius planned to prosecute him in an assembly of the people. Before he did so, he introduced the final ballot law. The law was passed and the prosecution was successful, resulting in Popilius being sentenced to exile. Cicero, who wrote in relation to the Cassian law that the optimates dreaded the "impetuosity of the masses and the licence accorded by the ballot" on matters affecting their safety, wrote: "as long as he [Coelius] lived he repented of having injured the republic, for the purpose of oppressing Caius Popilius".

== Voting after the ballot laws ==
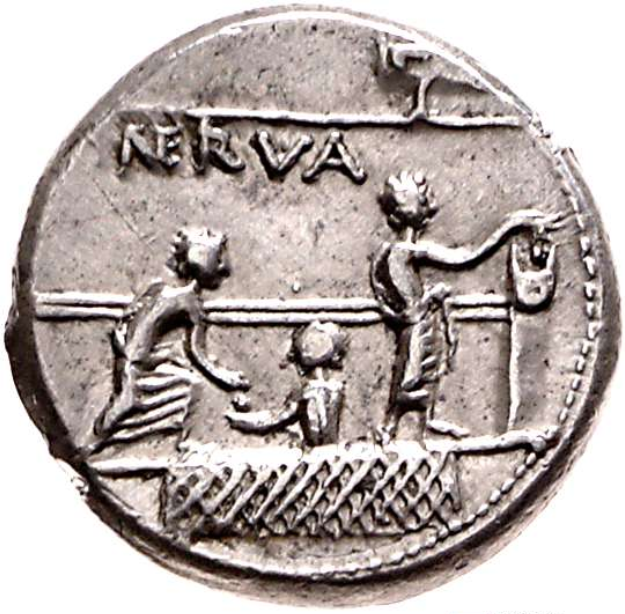
A coin from 113 to 112 BC, showing the only known depiction of a voting scene in the Roman Republic. On the left, a voter receives a ballot from an attendant below. On the right, another voter casts his ballot into the ballot box (cista). Both voters are standing upon a pons.

The ballot itself was a small wooden tablet covered with wax, called a tabella cerata. Voters would walk across a narrow causeway, called the pons, and be handed a ballot by an attendant (rogator). The voter would mark the ballot and deposit it into a ballot box (cista) made of wicker. The cista was watched over by guards (custodes). It was a great honor to be asked to be a rogator or custos, and only distinguished men were assigned to these roles. In addition to the guards appointed by the presiding officer, each candidate was entitled to a guard at each ballot box.

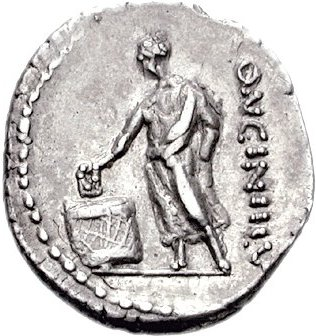
A 63 BCE coin depicting a Roman casting a ballot

To elect magistrates, voters expressed their preference by inscribing the initials of their preferred candidate with a stylus. They were expected to write in their own hand, and discovering multiple ballots with the same handwriting was considered evidence of fraud. When voting to fill multiple positions, such as the ten tribunes, it is unclear whether citizens inscribed the initials of only one candidate or of all ten. Nicolet argues for the single vote theory, pointing out that one round of voting sometimes failed to fill all tribune positions or even both consulships. Taylor believes the balance of evidence is against the single vote theory. However individuals were expected to vote and however the votes were aggregated, it is clear that a century or tribe was expected to send forth as many names as there were positions to be filled.

For judicial assemblies, jurymen were handed pre-inscribed ballots with A on one side and D on the other, representing Absolvo ("I acquit") or Damno ("I condemn"). The jurymen were expected to erase one of the letters without revealing their verdict. It was also possible for the ballot to contain L ("libero") instead of A, or C ("condemno") instead of D. The juror could even erase both sides of the ballot to indicate that the matter is unclear to him.

For legislation, voters wrote V for Uti rogas (“as you ask”) or A for antiquo “as they are” to express approval or disapproval of a proposal. A coin from 63 BCE (right) depicts a voter dropping a ballot inscribed with "V" into a cista, indicating approval of a proposal.

== Aftermath ==
The ballot laws had various effects on the republic. In the traditional view, they were a democratic reform that increased voter choice and reduced the influence of the upper classes. This is the view taken by Cicero, an aristocrat and opponent of the ballot laws:

Everyone knows that the ballot law has deprived the optimates of all their influence…The people should not have been provided with a hiding place, where they could conceal a mischievous vote by means of the ballot, and keep the boni in ignorance of their real opinions.

Cicero further comments: "the people cherishes its privileges of voting by ballot, which allows a man to wear a smooth brow while it cloaks the secrets of his heart, and leaves him free to act as he chooses, while he gives any promise he may be asked to give".

This reduction in influence was especially true for patrons and clients, as clients were expected to do favours for their patrons in return for financial support. With the secret ballot, clients could simply vote for the candidate of their choice without losing their patrons’ support. Yakobson suspects that this "must have had its impact on the nature of patron-client relations in this period."

One of the justifications for the ballot laws—aside from protecting the freedom of the people—may have been to curb corruption, since it was no longer possible for candidates to check whether a citizen voted for him. If that was the intention, the ballot laws had the opposite effect. Candidates could no longer rely on the support of their clients or of other citizens to whom they owed favours, making canvassing more important. In addition, candidates could previously bribe voters by promising payment upon receiving their vote. With the secret ballot, this was no longer possible, making it necessary to bribe potential as well as actual voters. Furthermore, voters had the option of accepting bribes from every candidate and voting for the highest bidder, or voting their conscience. This made bribery a more competitive affair as candidates attempted to outbid each other, either by holding lavish games and feasts or by directly promising money to voters.

Despite the expansion in voter freedom, the ballot laws did not reduce the aristocratic dominance of elections. The list of consuls and other elected officials is not any less aristocratic after the laws than before. In the last two centuries of the republic, more than half of the consuls were sons or grandsons of former consuls, and a third of consuls had at least one son who would become a consul.

One of the practical effects of the ballot laws was to increase the amount of time needed for voting, as ballot voting was much slower than voice voting due to the time needed to hand out the ballots, inscribe them, and count the votes. As a possible consequence, voting for elections in the Tribal Assembly became simultaneous in the late Republic. Previously, the tribes voted sequentially, with the votes of each tribe announced after the members finished voting. Voting in the Centuriate Assembly also became simultaneous in the late Republic, with the centuries in each class voting at one call—although the classes still voted in sequence. It is not clear whether these changes occurred before or after the ballot laws. There are other possible reasons for the change to simultaneous voting, including putting the tribes on an equal footing, or avoiding the bandwagon effect. Therefore, it is not certain that the ballot laws were the cause of the change.

=== Coinage ===
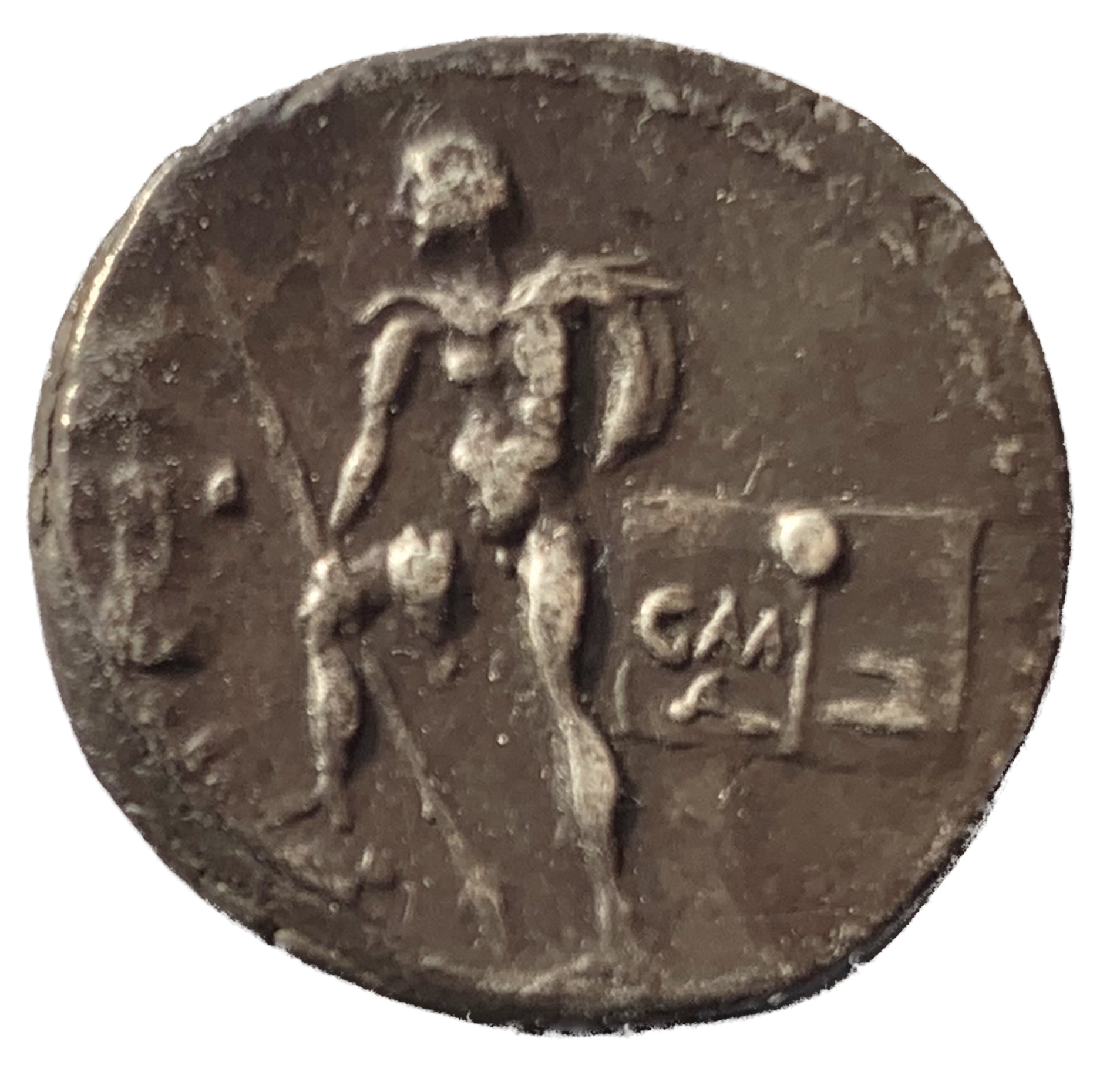
Blatant electioneering on a coin from around 96 BC. The moneyer's name is shown inscribed on a voting tablet: C. MAL[leolus], along with an Old Roman Cursive letter P (which may refer to the voting tribe).

The voting reforms have also been linked to a significant change in Roman coin designs. Crawford noted that the denarius of 137 BC marked a ‘decisive break with the traditional approach to selection of coin types’. Coin designs began to show a great variety of different themes, changing each year, and this continued until the end of the Republic. The process was summarised by Flower:

Traditionally, the Roman mint had favored repetitive coin types in patterns similar to the coins of Greek cities, especially of those in southern Italy. Now coin types started to change annually and to reflect designs chosen by the individual officials in charge of the mint each year. The new coins displayed a varied array of types that could refer to religious symbols, political ideas, anniversaries of historical events, monuments or buildings in Rome, or to the achievements and status of the moneyer's ancestors. The effort put into coin designs suggests that an audience for these images was envisioned, presumably beyond the circle of the moneyer's immediate family and friends. At the same time, the shift gave the moneyers themselves and their traditionally relatively humble job at the mint much more publicity and symbolic political capital than ever before. It has been argued that these new coin designs were aimed at the voters, who were now less open to more direct forms of pressure and influence.

Thus, as the mint magistrates were mostly young men at the start of their political career, the selection of coin design now offered an unrivalled opportunity to canvass the entire voting population:

The moneyer had the right to put a design of his own choosing on the state's money. Each coin offered the chance to introduce the moneyer's name to the public, whose votes he would soon seek in his bid for the quaestorship… The object was self-promotion.

== Loss of relevance ==
After the violent deaths of Tiberius Gracchus in 133 BC and Gaius Gracchus in 121 BC, political violence in Rome continued to intensify, soon becoming the norm and not the exception. The following century was occupied by numerous civil wars. In 88 BC, for the first time in Republican history, Sulla marched on Rome and occupied the city. This was followed by (among others) Sulla's civil war, the Catiline Conspiracy, Caesar's Civil War, the Battle of Philippi, and finally the War of Actium.

After the Final War ended in 30 BC, Octavius controlled all of Rome. He concentrated the powers of consul, tribune, and pontifex maximus in his own hands, ruling as an autocrat in all but name. Octavius, renamed Augustus in 27 BC, would be the first Roman emperor. These events marked the end of the Republic and the beginning of the Principate. Although the assemblies continued to meet during the Principate, Augustus removed their judicial role and began transferring their electoral power to the Senate; his successor Tiberius would completely end the electoral role of the assemblies. The assemblies continued to have legislative powers, but even under Augustus this power was exercised more and more rarely. Rome became an autocratic state in all but name, and the ballot laws became irrelevant to the running of the state.
