= Lex Baebia =

Ancient Roman law against electoral bribery and corruption

Lex Baebia was one of many laws enacted during the Roman Republic to combat ambitus (bribery or corruption) in the electoral process.

There is some confusion over the exact nature of this law, namely whether it was indeed a single law or two. Lex Baebia de praetoribus mandated the election of four and then six praetors in successive years. This law, however, was never observed. A second, Lex Baebia de ambitu, involved combating electoral bribery. Both laws had a similar purpose. The laws were championed by the plebeian consul Marcus Baebius Tamphilus in 181 BC.

== See also ==
- Roman law
- List of Roman laws
