= Lex Gabinia de piratis persequendis =

Roman anti-piracy law passed in 67 BC

The lex Gabinia (Gabinian Law), lex de uno imperatore contra praedones instituendo (Law establishing a single commander against raiders) or lex de piratis persequendis (Law on pursuing the pirates) was an ancient Roman special law passed in 67 BC, which granted Pompey the Great proconsular powers in any province within 50 miles of the Mediterranean Sea without holding a properly elected magistracy for the purpose of combating piracy. It also gave Pompey the power to appoint many legates and significant financial resources. The law was proposed and passed by the tribune Aulus Gabinius.

== Passage and immediate impact ==
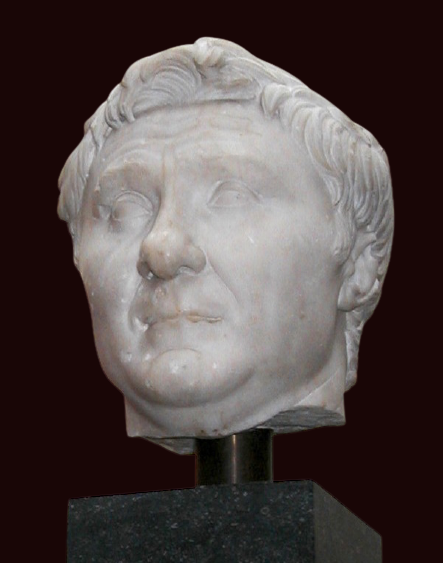
Bust of Pompey the Great.

Pompey enjoyed huge popularity amongst the plebeians of Rome on account of his previous successes against Sertorius and the allies of Gaius Marius, but the Roman Senate was wary of him and his growing power. The Senate was reluctant to give massive powers to any one man, especially one as popular as Pompey, fearing it would allow another dictator to seize power as Sulla had done just fifteen years before. The people, however, were unconcerned about vague abstractions of tyranny. They were concerned about the material effects of the pirates' raids and resulting disruption of the grain supply. In 68 BC, pirates set ablaze Rome's port at Ostia, destroyed the consular war fleet, and kidnapped two prominent senators, along with their retinue. Pompey, seeing a political opportunity, arranged for Aulus Gabinius to introduce what would become lex Gabinia.

The command came with a substantial fleet and army to fight the growing problems of pirates disrupting trade in the Mediterranean Sea. Appian, in his Roman History, estimated it at 270 warships, 120,000 infantry, and 4,000 cavalry. Others estimate these at 500 warships, 120,000 infantry and around 5,000 cavalry. He was also granted 144 million sesterces, disposal of the state treasury, and the authority to appoint 25 legates of praetorian rank. He was given an unprecedented term of three years to solve the problem.

Pompey managed to defeat the pirates in just three months.

Because most Roman territory was within the 50-mile limit around the Mediterranean, the law gave Pompey, who was then just 39, power over almost every province. In fact, this led to a dispute in 67 BC with the proconsul Quintus Caecilius Metellus Creticus, when the Cretans attempted to obtain better terms from Pompey than they were receiving from Metellus, who was charged with pacifying Crete.

== Legacy ==
The main impact of the lex Gabinia was not its direct impact on Roman trade, though this was considerable. Rather, it created a clear vision of the unity of the Republic's empire under the control of one man.

While Sulla, during his dictatorship, had intended to strengthen the senate and weaken the popular assemblies, Pompey's career and preceding consulship in 70 BC showed clearly that the Sullan constitutional reforms were not working. The senate was not empowered; power was not being shared among the aristocracy. The elevation of a person who, until his election to the highest office in the state was not even a senator, to a military command over an immense swath of the Republic's empire, established the precedent of extreme centralisation of military authority that could become central to the constitutional arrangements of the Principate.

During the Roman Empire, the law served as precedent for Augustus' receipt of greater proconsular authority over the entire empire in the constitutional settlement of 23 BC. The provision allowing Pompey to appoint various legates with propraetorian authority was a forerunner to the legati Augusti who served as the emperor's deputies in his provinces. That it occurred during the Republic allowed Augustus room to claim that his actions were not out of line with the mos maiorum (the ways of the ancestors) lending him credibility in claiming the restoration of the Republic and the sovereignty of the Roman people.

== See also ==
- Roman law
- List of Roman laws
