= Lex Luci Spoletina =

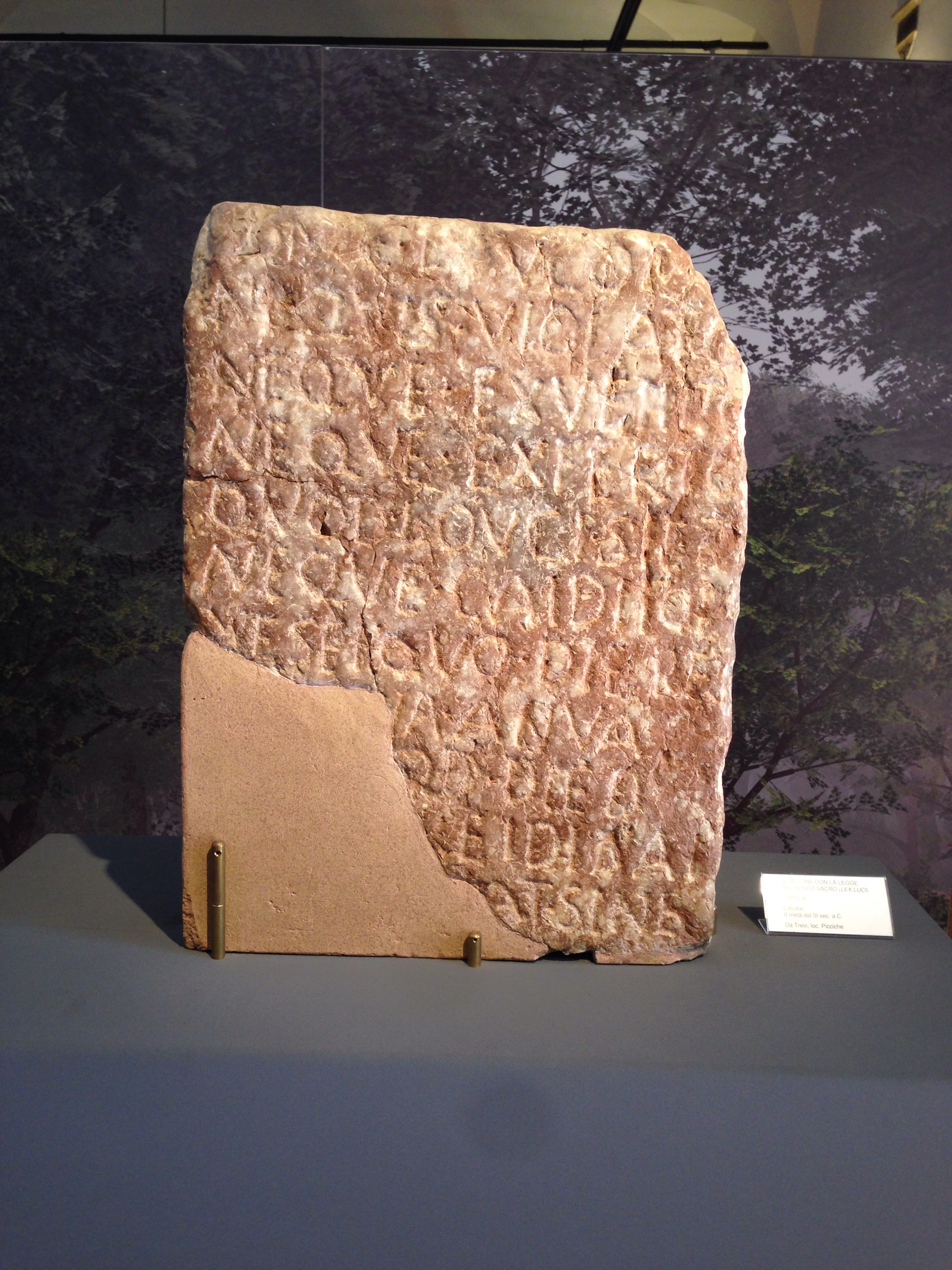
Lex Spoletina, stored at the Museo archeologico Sant'Agata

The Lex Luci Spoletina is a Roman law dated to around the 3rd-century BCE, likely shortly after Spoletium became a Roman colony in 241 BCE.

== Text ==
The text, preserved in two distinct tablets, forbids the cutting of woods or the removal of timber from a nearby lucus dedicated to Jupiter, except for the purpose worship on the specific day in which a festival of divine worship was performed.

This law is one of the most detailed and well-preserved examples of Roman laws concerning sacred groves. The law further outlined the appropriate punishments for individuals that violated thus law: those that had desecrated the area were required to sacrifice an ox to Jupiter and were fined 300 asses as punishment.

According to the text, the responsibility for the exaction of the fine fell upon a local magistrate termed the "dicator," which has been interpreted as a misspelling of "dictator," a title used for magistrates in other towns. The law makes particular reference to notion of malintent ("scies violasit dolo malo"), indicating that the determination of ill-intent was essential to deciding the ultimate punishment.

== Discovery ==
It was uncovered in 1876 by the Italian archaeologist Giuseppe Sordini, who discovered the artifact at the church of San Quirico in Castel Ritaldi.
