= Ambitus =

Political corruption crime in ancient Roman law

In ancient Roman law, ambitus was a crime of political corruption, mainly a candidate's attempt to influence the outcome (or direction) of an election through bribery or other forms of soft power. The Latin word ambitus is the origin of the English word "ambition" which is another of its original meanings; ambitus was the process of "going around and commending oneself or one's protégés to the people," an activity liable to unethical excesses. In practice, bringing a charge of ambitus against a public figure became a favored tactic for undermining a political opponent.

The Lex Baebia was the first law criminalizing electoral bribery, instituted by M. Baebius Tamphilus during his consulship in 181 BC. The passage of Rome's first sumptuary law the previous year suggests that the two forms of legislation are related; both were aimed at curbing wealth-based inequities of power and status within the governing classes. The temptation to indulge in bribery indicates that the traditional patron-client relationship was insufficient to gather enough votes to win an election.

The word ambitus for electoral corruption is a general term for the crime; defendants would have been charged under a specific statute (lex). The 2nd-century BC Greek historian Polybius, a major source on the workings of the Roman constitution, makes the extravagant assertion that while Carthaginians acquire public office by openly offering gifts, the penalty at Rome for doing so is death. The point is perhaps that ambitus could be construed as treason under some circumstances.

The rhetorical tactics of Cicero's speeches demonstrate how an initial charge of ambitus, under whatever statute, might devolve into an occasion for impugning or humiliating a public figure. Popularist politicians were particularly vulnerable to charges of currying favor with the masses, and ambitus might be alleged when a man of lower social rank defeated his superior in an election: "The defeat of a candidate boasting nobilitas by another not in possession of such standing appears to have been sufficient grounds for initiating a charge of ambitus."

During the Imperial era, the ambitious politician yielded of necessity to the bureaucrat in the holding of Roman magistracies. The Stoic philosopher Epictetus (1st–2nd centuries AD) recoiled from the rough-and-tumble of electoral politics and ambitus:

For the sake of these mighty and dignified offices and honours you kiss the hands of another man's slaves — and are thus the slaves of men who are not free themselves. … If you wish to be consul you must give up your sleep, run around, kiss men's hands, rot away at other men's doors … send presents to many and daily xenia [guest-gifts] to some. And what is the result? Twelve bundles of rods, sitting three or four times on the tribunal, giving games in the Circus, and distributing meals in little baskets.

Bribery of a person already holding office was covered by laws de repetundae; provincial governors were particularly susceptible to such charges.

== Terminology ==
A candidate was called petitor, and his opponent with reference to him, competitor. A candidate (candidatus) was so called from his appearing in the public places, such as the fora and Campus Martius, before his fellow-citizens, in a whitened (candidus) toga. On such occasions, the candidate was attended by his friends (deductores), or followed by the poorer citizens (sectatores), who could in no other manner show their goodwill or give their assistance. The word assiduitas expressed both the continual presence of the candidate at Rome, and his continual solicitations. The candidate, in going his rounds or taking his walk, was accompanied by a nomenclator, who gave him the names of such persons as he might meet; the candidate was thus enabled to address them by their name, an indirect compliment which could not fail to be generally gratifying to the electors. The candidate accompanied his address with a shake of the hand (prensatio). The term benignitas comprehended generally any kind of treating, such as shows or feasts. Candidates sometimes left Rome and visited the coloniae and municipia, in which the citizens had the suffrage; thus Cicero proposed to visit the Cisalpine towns, when he was a candidate for the consulship.

That ambitus, which was the object of several penal enactments, taken as a generic term, comprehended the two species — ambitus and largitiones (bribery). Liberalitas and benignitas are opposed by Cicero, as things allowable, to ambitus and largitio, as things illegal. The word for ambitus in the Greek writers is δεκασμός (dekasmos). Money was paid for votes; and in order to ensure secrecy and secure the elector, persons called interpretes were employed to make the bargain, sequestres to hold the money until it was to be paid, and divisores to distribute it. The offence of ambitus was a matter which belonged to the judicia publica, and the enactments against it were numerous. The earliest enactment that is mentioned simply forbade persons "to add white to their dress", with a view to an election (432 BC). This seems to mean using some white sign or token on the dress, to signify that a man was a candidate. The object of the law was to check ambitio, the name for going about to canvass, in place of which ambitus was subsequently employed. Still the practice of using a white dress on occasion of canvassing was usual, and appears to have given origin to the application of the term candidatus to one who was a petitor.

== Laws and restrictions ==
A Lex Poetelia (358 BC) forbade candidates canvassing on market days, and going about to the places in the country where people were collected. The law was passed mainly to check the pretensions of novi homines, of whom the nobiles were jealous. By the Lex Cornelia Baebia (181 BC), those who were convicted of ambitus were incapacitated from being candidates for ten years. The Lex Acilia Calpurnia (67 BC) was intended to suppress treating of the electors and other like matters: the penalties were fine, exclusion from the Roman Senate, and perpetual incapacity to hold office. The lex Tullia was passed in the consulship of Cicero (63 BC) for the purpose of adding to the penalties of the Acilia Calpurnia. The penalty under this lex was ten years' exile. This law forbade any person to exhibit public shows for two years before he was a candidate. It also forbade candidates from hiring persons to attend them and be about their persons.

In the second consulship of M. Licinius Crassus and Cn. Pompeius Magnus (55 BC), the Lex Licinia was passed. This lex, which is entitled De Sodalitiis, did not alter the previous laws against bribery; but it was specially directed against a particular mode of canvassing, which consisted in employing agents (sodales) to mark out the members of the several tribes into smaller portions, and to secure more effectually the votes by this division of labour. This distribution of the members of the tribes was called decuriatio. It was an obvious mode of better securing the votes. The mode of appointing the judices in trials under the Lex Licinia was also provided by that lex. They were called Judices Editicii, because the accuser or prosecutor nominated four tribes, and the accused was at liberty to reject one of them. The judices were taken out of the other three tribes; but the mode in which they were taken is not quite clear. The penalty under the Lex Licinia was exile, but for what period is uncertain.

The Lex Pompeia (52 BC), passed when Pompeius was sole consul for part of that year, appears to have been rather a measure passed for the occasion of the trials then had and contemplated than anything else. It provided for the mode of naming the judices, and shortened the proceedings. When C. Julius Caesar obtained the supreme power in Rome, he used to recommend some of the candidates to the people, who, of course, followed his recommendation. As to the consulship, he managed the appointments to that office just as he pleased. The Lex Julia de Ambitu was passed (18 BC) in the time of Augustus, and it excluded from office for five years those who were convicted of bribery. But as the penalty was milder than those under the former laws, we must conclude that they were repealed in whole or in part. Another Lex Julia de Ambitu was passed (8 BC) apparently to amend the law of 18 BC. Candidates were required to deposit a sum of money before canvassing, which was forfeited if they were convicted of bribery. If any violence was used by a candidate, he was liable to exile (aquae et ignis interdictio).

The popular forms of election were observed during the time of Augustus. Under Tiberius they ceased. Tacitus observes, "The comitia were transferred from the campus to the patres," the senate.

While the choice of candidates was thus partly in the hands of the senate, bribery and corruption still influenced the elections, though the name of ambitus was, strictly speaking, no longer applicable. But in a short time, the appointment to public offices was entirely in the power of the emperors; and the magistrates of Rome, as well as the populus, were merely the shadow of that which had once a substantial form. A Roman jurist, of the imperial period (Modestinus), in speaking of the Julia Lex de Ambitu, observes, "This law is now obsolete in the city, because the creation of magistrates is the business of the princeps, and does not depend on the pleasure of the populus; but if any one in a municipium should offend against this law in canvassing for a sacerdotium or magistratus, he is punished, according to a senatus consultum, with infamy, and subjected to a penalty of 100 aurei".

The laws that have been enumerated are probably all that were enacted, at least all of which any notice is preserved. Laws to repress bribery were made while the voting was open; and they continued to be made after the vote by ballot was introduced at the popular elections by the Lex Gabinia (139 BC). Rein observes that "by this change the control over the voters was scarcely any longer possible; and those who were bribed could not be distinguished from those who were not." One argument in favour of ballot in modern times has been that it would prevent bribery; and probably it would diminish the practice, though not put an end to it. But the notion of Rein that the bare fact of the vote being secret would increase the difficulty of distinguishing the bribed from the unbribed is absurd; for the bare knowledge of a man's vote is no part of the evidence of bribery. It is worth remark that there is no indication of any penalty being attached to the receiving of a bribe for a vote. The utmost that can be proved is, that the divisores or one of the class of persons who assisted in bribery were punished. But this is quite consistent with the rest: the briber and his agents were punished, not the bribed. When, therefore, Rein, who refers to these two passages under the lex Tullia, says: "Even those who received money from the candidates, or at least those who distributed it in their names, were punished," he couples two things together that are entirely of a different kind. The proposed Lex Aufidia went so far as to declare that if a candidate promised money to a tribe and did not pay it, he should be unpunished; but if he did pay the money, he should further pay to each tribe (annually?) 3000 sesterces as long as he lived. This absurd proposal was not carried; but it shows clearly enough that the principle was to punish the briber only.

The trials for ambitus were numerous in the time of the republic. The oration of Cicero in defence of L. Murena, who was charged with ambitus, and that in defence of Cn. Plancius, who was tried under the Lex Licinia, are both extant.

== See also ==
- Comes sacrarum largitionum
- Roman finance
- Largess

== Notes ==
1. Cic. pro Murena, c34
2. Cic. ad Att. i.1
3. Cicero de Oratore. ii.25; and cf. pro Murena, c36
4. Cic. pro Cluentio. 26
5. Cic. ad Att. i.16
6. None of the penalties mentioned in this article include the capital penalty. The generally reliable historian Polybius, however, a close first-hand observer of Roman polity, flatly states that at Rome the penalty for bribery was death (Histories, 6.56.4).
7. Liv. iv.25
8. Cretata ambitio, Persius, Sat. v.177; Polyb. x.4 ed. Bekker
9. Liv. vii.15
10. Liv. xl.19; Schol. Bob. p361
11. Dion Cassius xxxvi.21
12. Dion Cassius xxxvii.29; Cic. pro Murena, c23
13. Cic. pro Plancio, c18
14. In the main this is rightly explained by Rein, but completely misunderstood by Wunder and others. Furthermore, Drumann confounds the decuriatio with the coitio or coalition of candidates to procure votes (Geschichte Roms, vol. iv p93).
15. Suet. Caes. c41
16. Dion Cassius liv.16; Suet. Oct. 34
17. Dion Cassius lv.5
18. Tacitus, Annal. i.15
19. Dig. 48 14
20. Cic. pro Plancio, c23, pro Murena, c23
21. Cic. ad Att. i.16
22. A list of them is given by Rein.
23. Rein, Criminalrecht der Römer, where all the authorities are collected; Cic. Pro Plancio, ed. Wunder
- Smith, William, D.C.L., LL.D. A Dictionary of Greek and Roman Antiquities. John Murray, London, 1875.
- Peter Nadig, Ardet Ambitus. Untersuchungen zum Phänomen der Wahlbestechungen in der römischen Republik, Peter Lang, Frankfurt am Main - New York 1997 (Prismata VI), ISBN 3-631-31295-4
