= Lucius Roscius Otho =

Roman tribune

Lucius Roscius Otho was Roman tribune during the year 67 BC. He is most famous for the Roscian law. He was an intimate friend of Cicero who defended his law against the public upset.

== Roscian law ==
The Roscian law restored for members of the Equestrian order the right to the first 14 rows in Roman theatres, behind the 4 rows reserved for members of the Roman Senate. The Equestrian order was the second rank of the Roman aristocracy, ranking below the patricians.
