= Caesar's invasion of Macedonia =

Macedonian campaign during Caesar's civil war

- Part of Caesar's Civil War
Date	48 BC
Location	Greece
Result	Caesarian victory

Belligerents
Caesarians	Pompeians

Commanders and leaders
Julius Caesar; Mark Antony; Gnaeus Calvinus; Aegus (Note: Aegus and Roscillus fought on the Caesarian side until the Battle of Dyrrhachium; during which they defected to the Pompeian faction.); Roscillus	Pompey; Titus Labienus; Metellus Scipio; Lucius Ahenobarbus †; Lucius Lentulus Crus; Aegus; Roscillus

Caesar's invasion of Macedonia occurred as part of Caesar's civil war, starting with his landing near Paeleste on the coast of Epirus, and continuing until he forced Pompey to flight after the Battle of Pharsalus.

The main contemporary source for the theatre of the conflict is Caesar's Commentarii de Bello Civili, which documents events from the start of the civil war in 49 BC to Pharsalus. The account is, as expected from its authorship, partial to Caesar; further sources are Cicero's contemporary letters, and the later histories of Appian, Plutarch, and other imperial historians. The Caesarian telling of events continues in De Bello Alexandrino.

== Background ==
Pompey fled after the Siege of Brundisium to Macedonia two months after the start of the civil war in January 49 BC. The main reasons for his flight were the relative unpreparedness of his forces arrayed in Italy at the start of the civil war and the advantages moving to Macedonia would give him: "ready access to the massive resources of [the] eastern provinces... [in] an area where virtually every community and ruler was personally bound to him".

This massive availability of resources meant that Pompey was able to quickly assemble large amounts of troops, money, ships, and supplies for his campaign. He spent most of the year building and training his army opposite the Adriatic from Italy with the long-term goal of repeating Sulla's strategy of using the eastern provinces as a base from which to launch a counter-invasion.

Caesar did not immediately follow on: the bulk of his forces in March 49 BC had not yet reached southern Italy and he, regardless, lacked a fleet with which to cross the Adriatic. He chose instead to invade Pompey's Spanish provinces; he was successful and forced their surrender after the Battle of Ilerda in a summer campaign. Caesar's position in Italy was troubled by troop mutinies, "partly the product of a period of idleness", and he moved swiftly to take the initiative against Pompey.

== Crossing the Adriatic ==
On 4 January 48 BC, Caesar moved seven legions – most likely below half-strength – onto a small fleet he assembled and crossed the Adriatic. Caesar's opponent in the consulship of 59 BC, Marcus Calpurnius Bibulus, was in charge of defending the Adriatic for the Pompeians: Caesar's decision to sail, however, surprised Bibulus' fleet. Caesar landed at Paeleste, on the Epirot coast, without opposition or interdiction. However, the news of the landing spread and Bibulus' fleet quickly mobilised to prevent any further ships from crossing, placing Caesar at a significant numerical disadvantage.

=== Oricum and Apollonia ===
After Caesar's landing, he embarked on a night march against the town of Oricum. His army forced the surrender of the town without a fight; the Pompeian legate in command there – Lucius Manlius Torquatus – was forced by the townspeople to abandon his position. While Caesar's Commentaries report that they surrendered after refusing to stand against Caesar's imperium, "a rational calculation [of likely defeat] may also have contributed to their decision".

Bibulus' blockade meant that Caesar was unable to request food from Italy; and although the calendar reported January, the season was late autumn, meaning Caesar would have to wait many months to forage. While some grain ships were present at Oricum, they escaped before Caesar's forces could capture them. He then moved on Apollonia and forced its surrender, before decamping to attack Pompey's main supply centre at Dyrrhachium.

=== Manoeuvre ===
Around this time, Caesar reports sending a peace proposal in which the senate and people at Rome – now under Caesar's control – would arbitrate; the proposal was refused, possibly due to that control.

Pompey's reconnaissance was able to detect Caesar's movement toward Dyrrhachium and beat him to the vital supply centre. With Pompey's substantial forces arrayed against him, Caesar withdrew to his already-captured settlements. Caesar called for reinforcements under Mark Antony to transit the Adriatic to support him, but they were interdicted by Bibulus' mobilised fleet; in despair, Caesar attempted to transit from Epirus back to Italy, but was forced back by a winter storm. Pompey's forces, meanwhile, pursued a strategy of starving Caesar's legions out.

However, Antony was able to force a crossing around the time Bibulus died, arriving to Epirus on 10 April with four additional legions. Antony was lucky to escape the Pompeian fleet with minimal losses; Pompey was unable to prevent Antony's reinforcements from joining with Caesar.

=== Scipio, Thessaly and Aetolia ===
Meanwhile, Quintus Caecilius Metellus Pius Scipio had arrived in Macedonia with two legions from Syria. Caesar dispatched Gnaeus Domitius Calvinus with two legions, the Eleventh and the Twelfth, to intercept him before he could link up with Pompey.

Furthermore, Caesar received envoys from Aetolia and Thessaly who wanted to come over to his side, but needed troops to drive off the Pompeians. Caesar sent Gaius Calvisius Sabinus to Aetolia with five cohorts and a small number of cavalry, drawn from the legion that had garrisoned Oricum and Lucius Cassius Longinus to Thessaly with the XXVII legion.

== Battle of Dyrrhachium ==
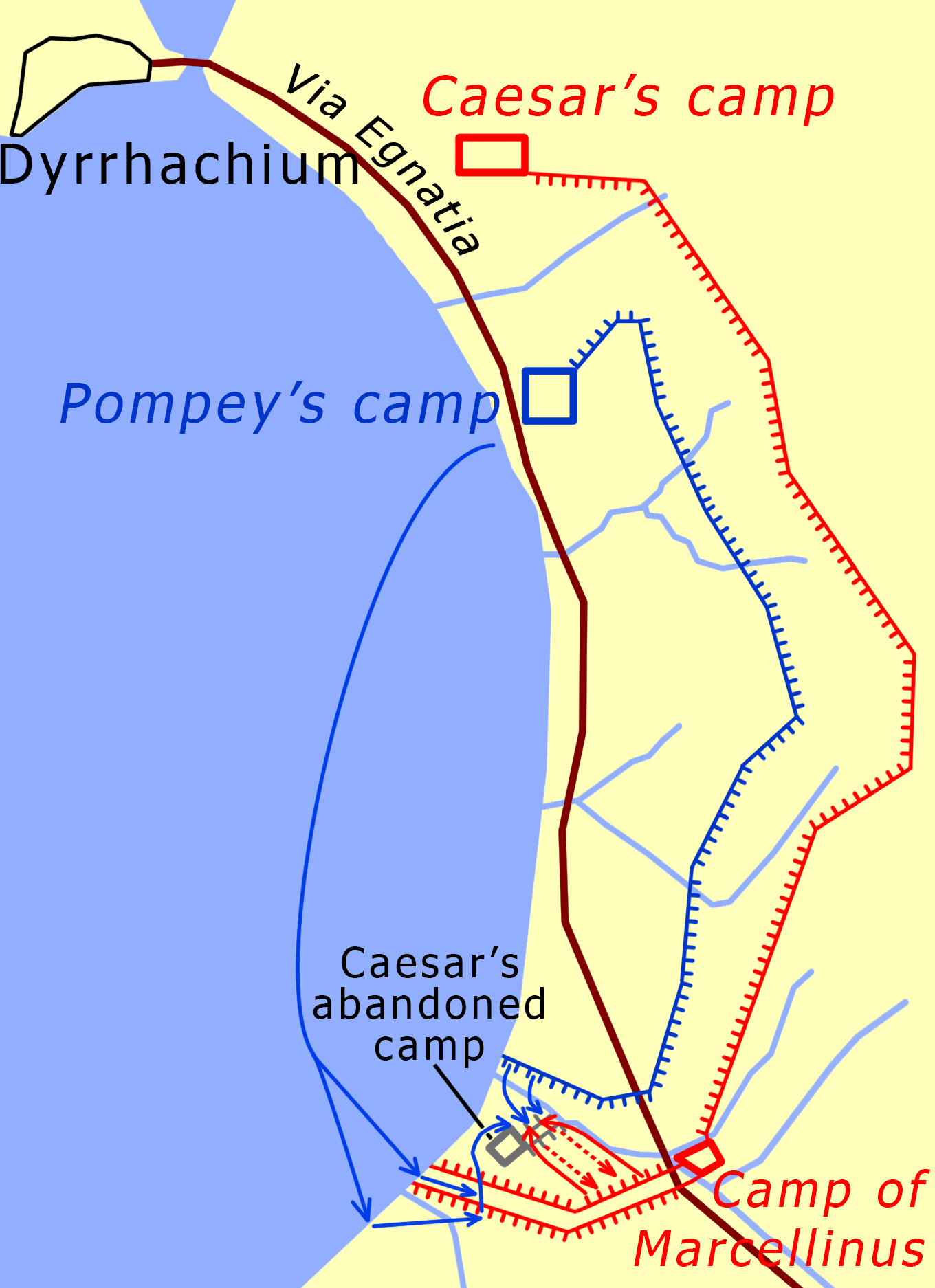
Depiction of the battle lines at Dyrrhachium. Caesar's forces in red; Pompey's in blue.

With a large army and a little-improved food situation, Caesar calculated that staying on the defensive was impossible and moved to besiege Dyrrhachium. Able, with his more experienced men, to get between Dyrrhachium and Pompey's army, he was forced to retreat from the walls of the city. Pompey's army responded by occupying and fortifying a hill outside the city called Petra, which also overlooked a natural harbour, allowing him to receive food for his men. After Caesar's departure from the Epirot coast and stripping of most of his coastal garrisons, Gnaeus Pompeius (homonymous son of Pompey) moved to retake the port of Oricum at the head of an allied fleet.

To safeguard his patrols and foragers at Dyrrhachium, Caesar ordered the construction of a line of fortifications parallel to Pompey's position, which quickly extended to an attempt to encircle Pompey's forces. Pompey responded by building counter-fortifications to protect his own lines of communication. Skirmishes followed, with some advantages for Pompey, who had to defend less frontage with more men. Caesar's food situation, however, had not improved; it had deteriorated to the point where his men were subsisting on a carnivorous diet with the addition of some roots. Caesar's soldiers were somewhat accustomed to the stringent state of supplies and remained in acceptable spirits; Pompey's soldiers, however, were cut off from water supplies when Caesar's men dammed the streams. Both armies also developed an outbreak of typhus.

Caesar's men made a final effort to capture a certain hill to complete the Caesarian circumvallation. Antony led Caesar's Legio IX but was driven off by a Pompeian counter-attack. Pompey responded by attacking a number of Caesarian forts opposite his lines, but they were slowed by fierce resistance before being driven back by reinforcements, inflicting heavy ranged casualties against the Caesarian defenders. While some of Caesar's officers "are supposed to have believed" that a counterattack would have driven the Pompeian forces to flight, the legate on the spot – Publius Cornelius Sulla – demurred.

When two Gallic noblemen, Aegus and Roscillus, and their retinues deserted from Caesar's camp to Pompey's, Pompey was informed of a supposed weak spot in the Caesarian lines, which he attacked and forced a Caesarian rout from the position. Caesar's men counterattacked: with some of Caesar's men lost and others fleeing, Caesar tried to steady the line by taking one of the banners, but was unsuccessful. Some accounts (though not Caesar's Commentaries) report that one of the routers tried to stab Caesar when he tried to reorganise his men, stopped only by Caesar's bodyguard. Pompey's victory inflicted heavy losses on Caesar's forces; he too demurred exploitation, prompting Caesar to exclaim that Pompey's army "would have won today, if only they were commanded by a winner", a judgement disputed by modern scholars. The Caesarian prisoners were killed, apparently at the order of Titus Labienus, who had served as one of Caesar's legates in Gaul before defecting to Pompey at the start of the war.

Caesar followed by trying to restore his army's morale; he demoted some of the officers in cohorts which had fled. Unable to complete his siege works, he decided to retreat from Dyrrhachium for central Greece. Under the cover of darkness, Caesar's forces were able to evade all but a few of Pompey's outriders and escape to central Greece.

== Manoeuvres to Pharsalus ==
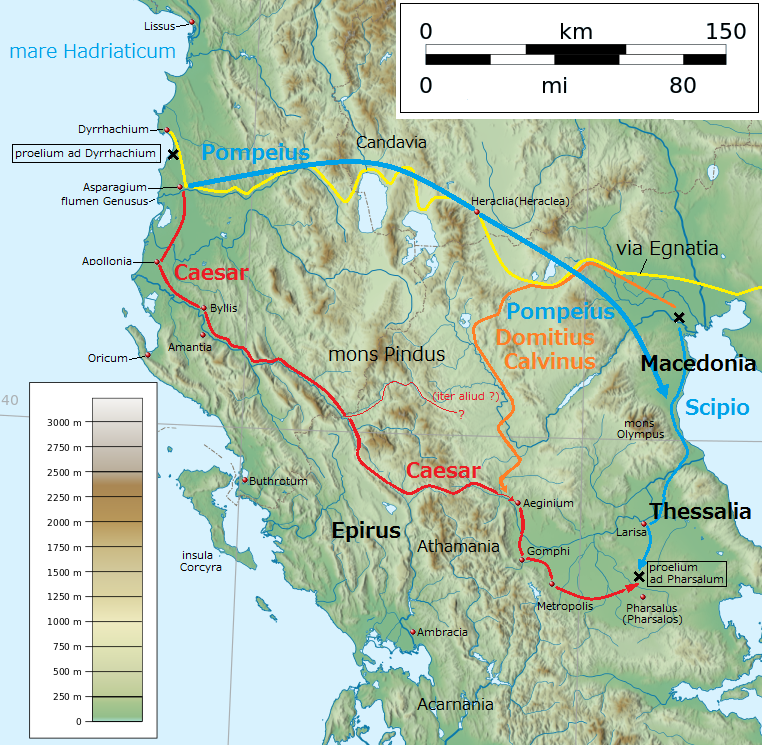

Moving east, Caesar's forces marched to support Gnaeus Domitius Calvinus' beleaguered forces against Pompeian reinforcements from Syria under Quintus Caecilius Metellus Pius Scipio. Caesar moved on Gomphi, which, emboldened by his defeat at Dyrrhachium, refused to yield to him. Storming and sacking the city, Caesar authorised a massacre of the city, which both deterred further challenges and, reportedly, improved the health of many of his men.

The victory at Dyrrhachium emboldened Pompey's officers. Lucius Domitius Ahenobarbus and others pushed for Pompey to engage Caesar in a decisive battle. Lucius Afranius pushed instead for Pompey to take his fleet and retake the Italian peninsula. Pompey, however, was wary of Caesar's veteran legions and his move against Scipio's reinforcements from Asia Minor. He therefore preferred to weaken Caesar by depriving him of supplies in Pompeian-friendly territory. This was not a popular decision: Ahenobarbus nicknamed Pompey as Agamemnon (for the king who had led the Greeks for ten years against Troy); Cicero, who was a Pompeian ally, openly spoke of the civil war as a choice of a dominatio under Pompey or Caesar; others too were suspicious of Pompey's motives, accusing him of prolonging the war to keep himself in command.

At the same time, the Pompeian officers started to quarrel over the spoils. Ahenobarbus, Scipio, and Publius Cornelius Lentulus Spinther argued over who would succeed Caesar as pontifex maximus. Amid squabbling between the Pompeian coalition over consulships, accusations against Afranius of betrayal at Ilerda, and demands by Ahenobarbus to punish Caesarians and self-proclaimed neutrals in Italy, Pompey's command was fractured and increasingly pushed by political rather than military rationales. Not all of those who had come to Pompey were squabbling and triumphalism. Cicero, writing to Cato, was disgusted with the politicking; both objected to giving battle as well. Possibly to keep Cato away from influencing the settlement after a decisive engagement, he was sent to garrison Dyrrhachium as Pompey's army moved into southern Macedonia; there, Cicero joined him.

Early in August, Pompey forces from Epirus and Scipio's forces from Asia joined. They then closed with Caesar's army. For some days, they manoeuvred around each other seeking favourable ground. While political pressure on Pompey for an engagement was strong, "it is by no means clear whether it was this which finally persuaded him to seek battle". Pompey's numerical superiority "made a battle, especially a battle in open country, an attractive prospect".

== Battle of Pharsalus ==
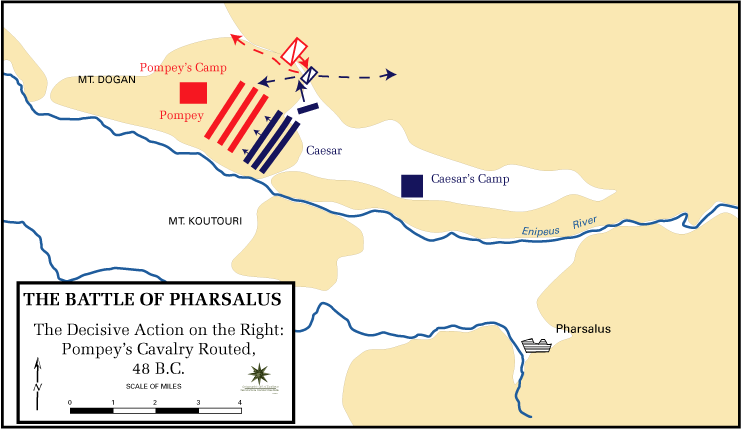
Troop movements during the battle.

On the morning of 9 August 48 BC, Caesar had been encamped before a Pompeian position on a hill. When Caesar ordered that the army pack up and leave, the Pompeian forces marched down the slope and onto a plain, offering battle. Caesar ordered his forces to halt, drop baggage, and form up for battle.

The two armies deployed on the bank of the river Enipeus, with the Pompeian right under Lucius Afranius anchored thereto. Pompey's forces were deployed relatively deep, which would have strengthened his men's cohesion at the cost of reducing the number of effectives on the front line. Commanding the centre was Quintus Caecilius Metellus Pius Scipio and commanding the left was Lucius Domitius Ahenobarbus. On the Pompeian left were deployed a large cavalry contingent under Titus Labienus. The Pompeian strategy seemed to be to overwhelm the Caesarian cavalry by numbers and then flank Caesar's infantry as it was pinned by Pompey's infantry force. The plan was "simple... but reasonable enough, exploiting [Pompey's] advantage in numbers and especially the great superiority in cavalry that would have room to manoeuvre on the open plain. Its main disadvantage was that there was no thought for what might happen if the cavalry attack failed".

Caesar forces were stretched relatively thin, with at most 22,000 men against Pompey's 40–45,000. Mark Antony commanded the left wing, with Gnaeus Domitius Calvinus commanding the centre and Publius Cornelius Sulla nominally – due to Caesar's presence with him – commanding the right. With the Pompeian cavalry plan "obvious", Caesar had six cohorts form an oblique line on his right flank.

After a few hours of manoeuvres, Caesar signalled for his infantry to close against the Pompeian infantry. When the battle started, Labienus advanced on the Pompeian left with his 6,000 cavalry: the attack was probably slow – "the horses can only have been in a poor state after... Dyrrhachium, which may well have meant the charge occurred at no faster rate than a trot" – and drive the Caesarian horse back. As Labienus' attack proceeded, however, his cavalry lost order before being set upon by Caesar's reserve line, wielding their pila as spears. Labienus' inexperienced cavalry then routed to the rear. Caesar's reserve line then moved around the Pompeian left and flanked Pompey's main infantry formation. After Caesar committed his fresh reserves, the Pompeian line collapsed.

The victorious Caesarians spared citizen-soldiers while massacring the auxiliaries. Caesar claims he killed some 15,000 enemies and captured some 24,000; Asinius Pollio gives the figure of 6,000, which "may well be more accurate". The commander of the Pompeian left, Lucius Domitius Ahenobarbus, was killed in the fighting. Pompey is said to have fled once the cavalry attack failed.

== Flight and pursuit ==
=== Pompey ===
After Pharsalus, Pompey and his family fled first to Lesbos and thence to Alexandria in Ptolemaic Egypt; the new child king of Egypt, Ptolemy XIII, had likely been recognised by the Pompeian senate-in-exile and given Pompey as a guardian. There, he was met with two Roman officers who had served with him in the east and were subsequently part of Aulus Gabinius' army which had intervened and then been stationed in Egypt from 55 BC. After arriving in Pelusium, he was beheaded by those officers in the hope of gaining Caesar's goodwill.

=== Metellus Scipio ===
Metellus Scipio, who had commanded the centre at Pharsalus, made his way to Africa. Caesar's involvement in the Egyptian dynastic dispute allowed Metellus Scipio, who took command at Cato's insistence from the Pompeian legate previous present there, Publius Attius Varus, to rebuild an army and fortify the province against Caesar's later offensive.

=== Cato and Cicero ===
Cato's movements through the civil war.

Cato, at Dyrrhachium, heard of the defeat at Pharsalus from Titus Labienus. His men panicked but Cato was able to calm them and decamp his forces to Corcyra to wait for further news. There, he offered command of his troops to Cicero, who was the senior consular present. Cato may have done so out of a sense of legal propriety (Cicero's imperium had been granted in the proper fashion before the war); he also might have done so from defeatism. Cicero declined the offer, refusing to fight in a war he had tried his utmost to prevent, and set sail for Italy with others who were willing to ask for and accept Caesar's pardon. Cato, restraining Pompey's homonymous son's threats, let Cicero go without incident.

He then sailed for Cyrenaica intending to join Pompey in Egypt. But upon hearing of Pompey's assassination there and of Metellus Scipio's forces in Africa, he rerouted to join Metellus Scipio. Sources differ as to his route: Plutarch reports a gruelling seven-day march along the coast; Cassius Dio instead reports that Cato sailed on the ships with which he had crossed the Mediterranean.

=== Caesar ===
Caesar moved with haste to follow Pompey. He first went to Asia, where he requisitioned supplies from the locals. After hearing news of Pompey's departure for Egypt, he followed quickly, arriving to Alexandria three days after Pompey's assassination. He travelled there with a small force to keep up speed.

Arriving to Alexandria on 2 October, he was presented with Pompey's head and signet ring. He supposedly recoiled in disgust and sorrow. Commentators dispute whether his reaction was genuine: "a cynical observer might say that it was very convenient for Caesar to be able to transfer to foreign assassins the guilt of killing one of the greatest heroes in the history of the republic [Pompey]".

He intended afterwards to stay, interfering in Egyptian affairs by mediating the succession crisis between Cleopatra and her brother Ptolemy XIII while also demanding repayment of debts inherited from Ptolemy XII Auletes, promptly inciting the Alexandrian war.
