= Lucius Volcatius Tullus =

Lucius Volcatius Tullus may refer to:

- Lucius Volcatius Tullus (consul 66 BC), Roman politician
- Lucius Volcatius Tullus (consul 33 BC), his son
