= Aegus and Roscillus =

Gaulish cavalrymen who fought in Caesar's civil war

- Born: c. 1st century BC
- Died: 48 BC (One of them)
- Occupations: Aristocrat; Military leader
- Known for: Serving Julius Caesar during the Gallic Wars and defecting to Pompey during Caesar's civil war
- Family: Abducillus (Father)
- Military career
- Allegiance: Roman Republic; Pompeians
- Branch: Roman Army
- Commands: Allobroges
- Conflicts: Gallic Wars; Caesar's civil war; Caesar's invasion of Macedonia; Battle of Dyrrhachium; Battle of Pharsalus †

Brothers Aegus and Roscillus (alternatively spelt Egus and Raucillus or Roucillus, one of whom died 48 BC) were two Celtic aristocrats and warriors who belonged to the Allobroges, a Gallic people that were ruled by the Romans in the 1st century BC.

The brothers fought in the Gallic Wars (58–50 BC) where they both served in the Roman cavalry under Julius Caesar. Following the outbreak of Caesar's civil war in 49 BC, they accompanied Caesar in his campaigns against Pompey but would defect to Pompey's side during the Battle of Dyrrhachium. During a cavalry engagement ahead of the Battle of Pharsalus, one of the brothers was killed.

== Biography ==
=== Early life and military career ===
Aegus and Roscillus were both members of the Allobroges, a Gallic people who inhabited a stretch of territory between the Rhône river and the Alps during the late Iron Age. The Allobroges had been annexed by the Roman Republic and integrated into the province of Gallia Transaplinia in 121 BC. Their father, Abducillus, was ruler of the Allobroges for several years.

After Julius Caesar began his conquest of Gaul in 58 BC, the brothers would join him and serve in his cavalry. In his writings, Caesar praised the brothers and claimed to have granted them high-ranking offices in addition to land and wealth from the lands in Gaul that they had conquered for their service. With the outbreak of civil war between Caesar and Pompey in 49 BC, the brothers would continue to follow Caesar and participated in the Macedonian campaign.

=== Defection to Pompey during Caesar's civil war ===
During the months-long Battle of Dyrrhachium in 48 BC, the brothers became embroiled in a controversy on accusations of fraudulently depriving the cavalry of pay, appropriating the plunder claimed in recent battles for themselves rather than distributing it, and falsely reporting the size of their force to superiors to steal the excess pay they received. After the issue was brought before Caesar, he publicly stated that he would delay passing judgement on account of the battle while privately reprimanding them. Believing that Caesar intended to punish them in the future, the brothers decided to defect to Pompey.

After making some initial preparations, they plotted to assassinate Gaius Volusenus, one of Caesar's cavalry officers, to strengthen their stranding with Pompey in advance. When no opportunity presented itself, they instead decided to borrow as much money as they could under the guise of paying off their officers and then used some of it to buy horses before suddenly deserting to Pompey's camp.

Following Caesar's defeat at Dyrrhachium, he would retreat to Thessaly where Pompey pursued him. Caesar reports that during a cavalry skirmish shortly before the Battle of Pharsalus, one of the brothers was killed although which is not specified.
