= Manius Aemilius Lepidus =

Manius Aemilius Lepidus may refer to:

- Manius Aemilius Lepidus (consul 66 BC)
- Manius Aemilius Lepidus (consul 11)
