= Gaius Cornelius (tribune 67 BC) =

Roman Republic tribune of the plebs in 67 BC

Gaius Cornelius was a politician during the late Roman Republic. He is most famous for serving as tribune of the plebs in 67 BC.

== Career ==
Cornelius was elected quaestor for 70 BC, and served under the consul Pompey. Alongside Pompey's ally Aulus Gabinius, Cornelius was later elected tribune for the year 67 BC.

At the start of his tribunate, he brought several controversial laws before the Roman People (populus Romanus). According to Asconius Pedianus, Cornelius had tried to persuade the Senate to ban senators from lending money to foreign envoys at high rates of interest. When the Senate refused, Cornelius proposed a bill re-instating the ancient principle that no one (including a senator) was exempt from the laws unless the populus had granted them special dispensation. The Senate convinced a tribune, Publius Servilius Globulus, to veto this law. However, Cornelius ignored Servilius' veto and continued with proceedings, prompting the consul Gaius Piso to intervene. But when Cornelius' supporters attacked Piso and smashed his fasces, Cornelius panicked and withdrew the bill, replacing it with a more lenient version.

Cassius Dio tells a different version of events. According to Dio, Cornelius brought forward a law to increase the punishments for electoral bribery. After the Senate opposed this, Cornelius proposed another law ruling that no senator could usurp the rights or decisions of the populus Romanus. The consul Piso tried to intervene, but his fasces were smashed, prompting Cornelius to withdraw the bill and replace it with a version allowing the Senate to take a preliminary vote on these matters.

According to both Asconius and Dio, Cornelius also passed another law concerning praetorian edicts. At the start of each year, it was customary for praetors to issue a standing edict outlining how they intended to dispense justice during that year. However, since many praetors were ignoring their own edicts and deciding cases inconsistently, Cornelius passed a law forcing them to obey the terms of their initial edicts.

== Prosecutions ==
Because he had ignored a tribune's veto and incited violence against a consul, Cornelius was prosecuted twice in the following years. In 66 BC, two brothers, Publius and Gaius Cominius, indicted him under the lex Cornelia de maiestate. However, on the day of the trial, the presiding praetor failed to arrive, leaving Cornelius' supporters free to intimidate and threaten the Cominii brothers. On the next day, the praetor appeared but the Cominii stayed away out of fear, with the result that the praetor declared the trial null and void.

In the next year, 65 BC, Cornelius was again accused de maiestate. This time, the prosecution was supported by the testimony of some of the most powerful men in the state, including ex-consuls such as Hortensius, Catulus, and Metellus Pius. However, Cornelius was defended by the famous orator Cicero, and was successfully acquitted. Although Cicero's speech (pro Cornelio) does not survive, significant portions are preserved by Asconius, who wrote a detailed commentary on the speech.
