= First Catilinarian conspiracy =

Fictitious conspiracy circa 65 BC to install new Roman consuls by force

The first Catilinarian conspiracy was an almost certainly fictitious conspiracy in the late Roman Republic. According to various ancient tellings, it involved Publius Autronius Paetus, Publius Cornelius Sulla, Lucius Sergius Catilina, and others. Ancient accounts of the alleged conspiracy differ in the participants; in some tellings, Catiline is nowhere mentioned. Autronius and Sulla had been elected consuls for 65 BC but were removed after convictions for bribery, and new consuls were then elected. The supposed goal of the conspiracy was to murder the second set of consuls elected for 65 BC and replace them in their resulting absence.

Almost all modern historians believe the conspiracy is fictitious and dismiss claims thereof as merely slanderous political rumours. The core of the legend, a plot by the two consuls-elect for 65 BC to kill and usurp the consuls, is dismissed as inconceivable. The participation of others, such as Catiline, is rejected as inconsistent with their immediately following political actions; most claims of participation are believed to be discrediting retrojections introduced in the aftermath of the real Catilinarian conspiracy in 63 BC.

== Ancient accounts ==
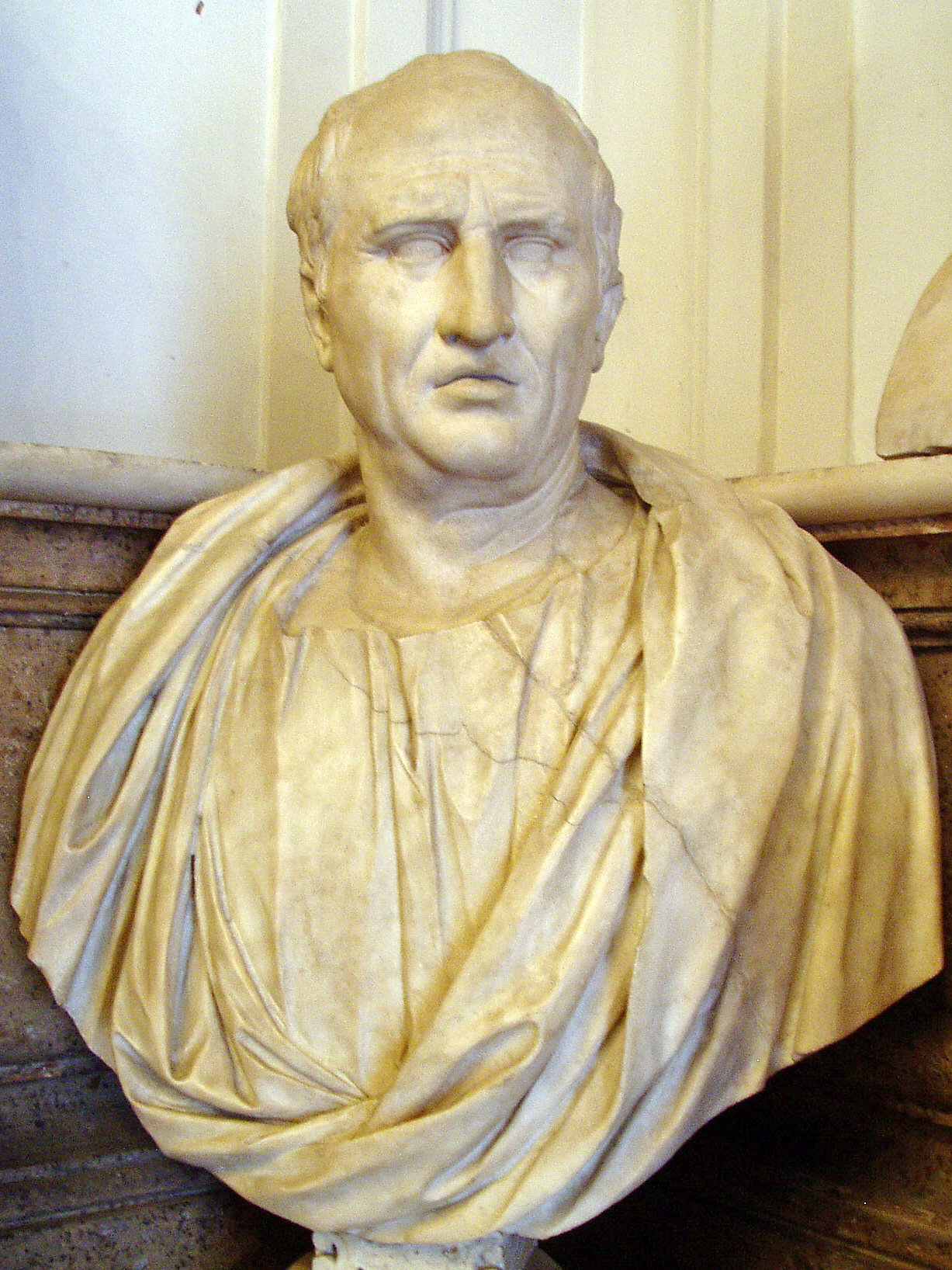
A 1st century AD bust of Cicero, one of the principal sources alleging Catiline's involvement in this fictitious conspiracy. He later exposed as consul the real Catilinarian conspiracy in 63 BC.

The inciting incident for the conspiracy was the election of two consuls-designate for 65 BC, Publius Autronius Paetus and Publius Cornelius Sulla, followed by the invalidation of the results. They were accused and convicted of ambitus, electoral corruption, preventing them from entering office and expelling them from the senate. The two other leading candidates, Lucius Manlius Torquatus and Lucius Aurelius Cotta, were elected in a second election and then slated to enter office on the first day of 65 BC in their place. Catiline supposedly became involved when his consular candidacy was rejected by the presiding magistrate for the comitia in 66 BC, Lucius Volcatius Tullus.

=== Accounts ===
Cicero's account survives, although scattered over a number of speeches. At various times and contexts, he claimed there was a conspiracy:

- involving Catiline and Gnaeus Calpurnius Piso to massacre conservative senators some time in 65 BC;
- involving Autronius, Sulla, and Catiline to make Autronius and Sulla consuls conceived of in 66 and to be executed at the start of 65 BC;
- mentioning only Catiline with vague activity and goals in December 66 BC; and
- involving Autronius and Catiline to make themselves consuls.

Sallust describes a conspiracy developed in December 66 BC involving Autronius, Catiline, and Piso to make Autronius and Catiline consuls by violence on 1 January 65 BC. His description then includes a further conspiracy to murder many senators and assume the consulship on 5 February 65 BC after the discovery of the first plot.

Livy's account survives only in the Periochae. The summary thereof states only that a conspiracy, by those who had stood for the consulship but were convicted of ambitus (Autronius and Sulla), to kill the consuls was suppressed.

Suetonius' account has no mention of Catiline and instead has Autronius conspiring with Julius Caesar (later dictator) and Marcus Licinius Crassus (later Caesar's ally) to butcher the replacement consuls and have Crassus made dictator with Caesar as magister equitum. Caesar would help by cooperating with Piso to raise an insurrection in Hispania and elsewhere. Crassus and Caesar would then restore Autronius and Sulla to their vacated consulships.

Cassius Dio gives no mention of Crassus and Caesar, relating instead that Autronius, Sulla, Catiline, and Piso conspired to make Autronius and Sulla consuls.

=== Aftermath ===
In the aftermath of the rumours, the senate voted to provide bodyguards for the consuls and to establish an inquiry; the inquiry, however, was vetoed by one of the tribunes. When Catiline was tried for corruption later in 65 BC, one of the sitting consuls he was alleged to have planned to murder, Lucius Manlius Torquatus, appeared in his defence and indicated his disbelief of the rumours. On his part, Cicero continued to slander Catiline through following years with the allegations due both to his personal enmity with Catiline and his desire to embellish his suppression of Catiline's revolt in 63 BC.

== Modern views ==
Modern historians almost universally doubt that the conspiracy ever existed and view it as fictitious. Older scholarship had varied views, positing various theories: the conspirators could have been agents of a shadowy anti-Pompeian faction or a motley group of opportunists, or that Catiline may have been an ally of Torquatus, Sulla, or have been unrelated, engaging only tangentially because of the trial of Gaius Manilius in December 66 BC. Since the 1960s, most historians reject the conspiracy's historicity.

Robin Seager in a 1964 article proposes means by which the legend was developed. According to Seager, Cicero sought to discredit Catiline prior to his consulship by associating him to a supposed plot that came to nothing; he later excised Publius Sulla from his descriptions when he needed to defend him. Another tradition attempted something similar by putting Caesar's name into the mix. Of the possibility of a core conspiracy by the two consuls-designate unseated for corruption, Seager writes "it is inconceivable that there was such a plot ... they could have had no hope of recovering the consulship even for a single day." As to Suetonius' claims, beyond the fact that Crassus and Caesar could have had no part in a non-existent conspiracy, they would have had no reason to join one: the two would have had nothing to gain and everything to lose. As to Piso's involvement, Seager dismisses any such involvement as implausible given that he soon received the honour of an early governorship in Hispania from the senate.

Erich S. Gruen in a 1969 article similarly dismisses the ancient descriptions as "hopelessly muddled by propaganda and invective", explaining that after the actual Catilinarian conspiracy in 63 BC, "it was in any politician's interest to associate his enemies with Catiline", and that later stories embellished this by inventing a role for Caesar and Crassus after Caesar's polarising consulship in 59 BC. Catiline may have engaged in some demonstrations related to a riotous trial – that of Manilius – at the end of 66 BC; however, there is little reliable evidence of a connection between those demonstrations and any attempts to overturn the consular elections.
