= Lucius Caecilius Metellus (consul 68 BC) =

Roman politician

Lucius Caecilius Metellus was a Roman aristocrat. He was praetor in 71 BC. He succeeded Gaius Verres as governor of Sicily in 70 BC. He died in office as consul in 68 BC. His co-consul was Quintus Marcius Rex.

== Family ==
The Caecilii Metelli were an illustrious family of the Roman republic. They were politically conservative, although members of the plebeian gens Caecilia.

Lucius' grandfather was Quintus Caecilius Metellus Macedonicus. He was praetor in 148 BC, consul in 143 BC, and censor in 131 BC. He was given the command in Macedonia, where he defeated Andriscus, a pretender to the throne. He received a triumph and the cognomen 'Macedonicus' for his victory. He was an opponent of Tiberius Gracchus and Gaius Gracchus.

Lucius' father was Gaius Caecilius Metellus Caprarius, Macedonicus' youngest son. Caprarius fought under Scipio Aemilianus in Numantia. He was praetor in 117 BC, consul in 113 BC, and fought as proconsul in Thrace in 112 BC. He triumphed for his victory in Thrace in 111 BC. He was censor in 102 BC.

Lucius had two brothers. One was Quintus Caecilius Metellus Creticus. Creticus was praetor in 74 BC, consul in 69 BC, and pontifex from 73 until his death in the late 50s BC. He was given the proconsular command against Crete during his consulship. He subjugated the island and triumphed for his victory in 62 BC. He was an opponent of Pompey. Lucius' other brother was Marcus Caecilius Metellus. He was praetor and president of the extortion court in 69 BC.

Lucius' sister, Caecilia Metella, was married to Gaius Verres. Verres was governor of Sicily from 73 to 71 BC and the defendant on trial in Cicero's speech Against Verres I.

== Role in Verres' trial ==
In Cicero's Against Verres, Cicero is the prosecuting attorney on behalf of the island of Sicily. They were prosecuting Verres for moral corruption, bribery, theft, and killing Roman citizens without a trial, something forbidden by Roman law. The trial took place in late 70 BC. Lucius's family supported Verres, and were well-positioned to support him: Lucius was Governor of Sicily when the trial took place, his elder brother, Creticus, was to be consul in 69 BC along with fellow Verres supporter Quintus Hortensius Hortalus, and Marcus, the youngest brother, was to be president of the extortion court in 69 BC. Because of this, Verres unsuccessfully tried to put off the trial until 69 BC, when the Caecilii Metelli and Hortensius would have the power to gain his acquittal.

== See also ==
- Caecilia gens

Preceded by Quintus Caecilius Metellus Creticus and Quintus Hortensius	Consul of the Roman Republic with Quintus Marcius Rex; 68 BC	Succeeded by Manius Acilius Glabrio and Gaius Calpurnius Piso
