= Chelidon =

Chelidon may refer to:

- Chelidon (courtesan), a Roman courtesan (fl. 74 BC)
- Chelidon (mythology), multiple figures from Greek mythology, including:
  - Chelidon (sister of Aëdon)
