= Volusenus =

Volusenus is a Roman nomen, and a surname. People with the name include:

- Gaius Volusenus (fl. mid-1st century BCE), distinguished military officer of the Roman Republic
- Florentius Volusenus (c. 1504 – 1546 or 1547), Scottish humanist
