= Autronia gens =

Ancient Roman plebeian family

The gens Autronia was a plebeian family at Rome. Persons of this gens first came into notice in the last century of the Republic; the first member who obtained the consulship was Publius Autronius Paetus, in 65 BC.

== Branches and cognomina ==
The only surname of the Autronii was Paetus, a cognomen in many other gentes. It originally signified a person who had a slight cast in the eye, but it did not indicate such a complete distortion of vision as Strabo.

== Members ==
This list includes abbreviated praenomina. For an explanation of this practice, see filiation.

- Lucius Autronius Paetus, grandfather of the consul of 33 BC.
- Publius Autronius L. f. Paetus, elected consul in 65 BC, but his election was declared void after he was accused of bribery.
- Lucius Autronius P. f. L. n. Paetus, consul suffectus in 33 BC, in place of Augustus, who resigned his office immediately after entering upon it on the Kalends of January. He then obtained a triumph as proconsul of Africa, in 29 BC.

== See also ==
- List of Roman gentes
