= Quintus Marcius Rex (consul 68 BC) =

Roman politician and general

Quintus Marcius Rex was a consul of the Roman Republic.

He was the grandson of another Quintus Marcius Rex, the consul of 118 BC. One of his second cousins was the dictator Julius Caesar, the great-grandson of another Quintus Marcius Rex, the praetor in 144 BC who constructed the Aqua Marcia. He was elected consul for 68 BC with Lucius Caecilius Metellus. Metellus died near the start of the year, and, although Servilius Vatia was elected to replace him, Vatia died before he could enter office and Marcius continued as sole consul. Marcius went to serve in Cilicia as proconsul and, pressured by his brother-in-law, Publius Clodius, refused to help Lucius Licinius Lucullus. He gave up his province in 66 BC to comply with the lex Manilia that gave command of the provinces of the east to Gnaeus Pompeius Magnus.

He was denied a triumph upon his return. He was still waiting outside the city for a triumph when the Catilinarian Conspiracy broke out in 63 BC. He was sent to watch the movements of Gaius Manlius, Catilina's general. He refused to listen to Manlius's offers of peace.

Marcius had married Clodia Tertia, a sister of Publius Clodius Pulcher. He died in 61 BC, without leaving to his brother-in-law an expected inheritance.

| Preceded by Quintus Caecilius Metellus Creticus and Quintus Hortensius | Consul of the Roman Republic with Lucius Caecilius Metellus; 68 BC | Succeeded by Manius Acilius Glabrio and Gaius Calpurnius Piso |
