= Dionysia (stage artist) =

Roman dancer (fl. 1st c. BC)

Dionysia (1st-century BC), was an ancient Roman dancer-actress.

Dionysia was evidently a famous stage artist in Ancient Rome, as her name was known enough to be used in public debate. She is one of few female stage artists from antiquity of which there is specific sums of a notably great income, an example used in research that elite actresses in Ancient Rome could earn great amounts on their career.

In 66 BC, in his speech in favour of Quintus Roscius, Cicero noted that the famous dancer Dionysia earns 200,000 sestertius, which he appears to assume to be a well known fact. In an insult against the orator Hortensius in 62 BC, his gestures are mockingly compared to that of an actress, Dionysia.
