= Publius Cornelius Sulla =

Roman politician

Publius Cornelius Sulla (died c. 45 BC) was a politician of the late Roman Republic and the nephew of Lucius Cornelius Sulla. He was also a brother-in-law of Pompey, having married his sister Pompeia.

== Early life ==
Publius Cornelius Sulla was the son of an otherwise unknown brother of Lucius Cornelius Sulla.

Despite being Sulla's nephew, Publius does not seem have played a prominent role in either the civil war or the dictatorship of his famous uncle. However, he may have served as a junior officer during this time, alongside his contemporary Lucius Sergius Catilina, who is known to have served with distinction in the Sullan Civil Wars. Publius was later to be closely associated with Catiline, and it is possible that it was as fellow officers under his uncle that this association began.

In 81 BC, during the dictatorship of his uncle, Cicero records that Publius used what influence he had through his close familial connection to request mercy for several of the proscribed, and was successful in having them spared. Following the death of Lucius Cornelius Sulla in 78 BC, Publius likely inherited a portion of his estate.

In 80 BC Publius set up the city of Pompeii as a Roman colony under the name of 'Colonia Cornelia Veneria Pompeianorum'. The name meaning, Pompeii a colony of the Cornelii dedicated to Venus. The people of Pompeii seem to have liked him as they came in support of him in his trial in 62 BC.

== Consulship scandal and First Catilinarian conspiracy ==
Having presumably worked his way up the cursus honorum, achieving the pre-requisite offices of quaestor and praetor at an earlier date, in 66 BC Sulla stood for election to the consulship (to assume office in 65 BC). Sulla was elected consul by the unanimous vote of all the centuries, with Publius Autronius as his colleague. However, the two were not to enjoy their success for long as, soon after the result had been declared, Lucius Manlius Torquatus and Lucius Aurelius Cotta, who had both stood against Sulla in the election and lost, accused those who had defeated them of bribery. Impeached on this charge, Sulla and Autronius were tried, convicted and, under the Lex Acilia Calpurnia, deprived of their office and expelled from the Senate.

A second round of elections were held in which Torquatus and Cotta were successful, replacing those they had removed as the consuls-designate for 65 BC. It was now that the so-called First Catilinarian Conspiracy was allegedly hatched.

It is alleged by the Roman historian Sallust that Catiline, a friend of both Sulla and Autronius, attempted to stand in the second round of elections against Torquatus and Cotta but was prevented in doing so because he had only recently emerged from a trial for extortion and, although he had been acquitted, was not permitted to stand for any office until three weeks had elapsed. This was the second time Catiline had been denied his chance at the consulship, and, incensed, he formed a conspiracy along with the deposed Sulla and Autronius, as well as Gnaeus Piso, against Cotta and Torquatus. The plan was apparently no less than to murder the two new Consuls-Elect on the very day they were to assume office, 1 January 65 BC, and to seize the government and Consulship for themselves. The preparations of the conspirators were however detected and they first postponed their planned coup to February, before abandoning it altogether; the conspiracy therefore coming to naught.

There is much doubt as to whether the First Catilinarian Conspiracy ever took place at all, and that it was instead later invented to blacken Catiline further following the Second Catilinarian Conspiracy. An alternative view is that Catiline himself was not involved, but Sulla and Autronius on their own plotted the assassination of their rivals. In any case, no attempt was made on the lives of Cotta or Torquatus and the two assumed the consulship without incident.

== Implication in the Second Catilinarian conspiracy ==
Following the disgrace of his conviction and expulsion from the Senate, Sulla's political career and reputation was completely destroyed and he could play no further part in public life. Humiliated and impoverished, Sulla reputedly joined the disreputable circle of desperate and dissolute nobles gathering around Catiline to form the Second Catilinarian Conspiracy. Catiline and his followers believed they had been robbed of the power that was rightfully theirs, and were committed to take it by any means necessary.

Sulla, his cousins Publius and Servius, as well as his former colleague Autronius, were implicated in the conspiracy. Following the failure of the Conspiracy in late 63 and Catiline's death in January 62, Sulla was put on trial for his alleged complicity by Lucius Manlius Torquatus, the son of the man who had impeached him in 66. Sulla managed to secure both Marcus Tullius Cicero and Quintus Hortensius, the two greatest orators of the age, for his defence, and was acquitted of all charges. This was the occasion for Cicero delivering his Pro Sulla speech. Neither Sulla's cousins nor Autronius were so fortunate, as Cicero believed them to be guilty and refused their similar requests for defence.

== Career in Caesar's Civil War ==
In 49 BC, when Julius Caesar crossed the Rubicon and ignited the Civil War, Sulla chose to support him against the Senate. Given a command in the Caesarian army, Sulla accompanied Caesar on his campaign in Greece against Pompey. At Dyrrachium, Sulla was left in charge of Caesar's camp and successfully repulsed a Pompeian attack which broke through the fortifications while the bulk of the army was elsewhere fighting with Caesar. Upon driving the Pompeians back, Sulla determined not to pursue and instead withdrew back to the camp. Caesar remarks in his commentaries that if Sulla had instead pursued the fleeing enemy and followed up on his victory, the entire Civil War might have been ended on that day. However, he does not blame Sulla's cautious conduct or his decision to stay in the camp, which was his responsibility to protect.

Sulla commanded the right wing of Caesar's army at the Battle of Pharsalus. In the battle, the Caesarians were victorious and the defeated Pompey fled to Egypt, where he was murdered.

Publius Cornelius Sulla died in 45 BC.
