= Battle of Dyrrhachium (48 BC) =

Siege battle, part of Caesar's civil war

- Part of Caesar's invasion of Macedonia during Caesar's civil war
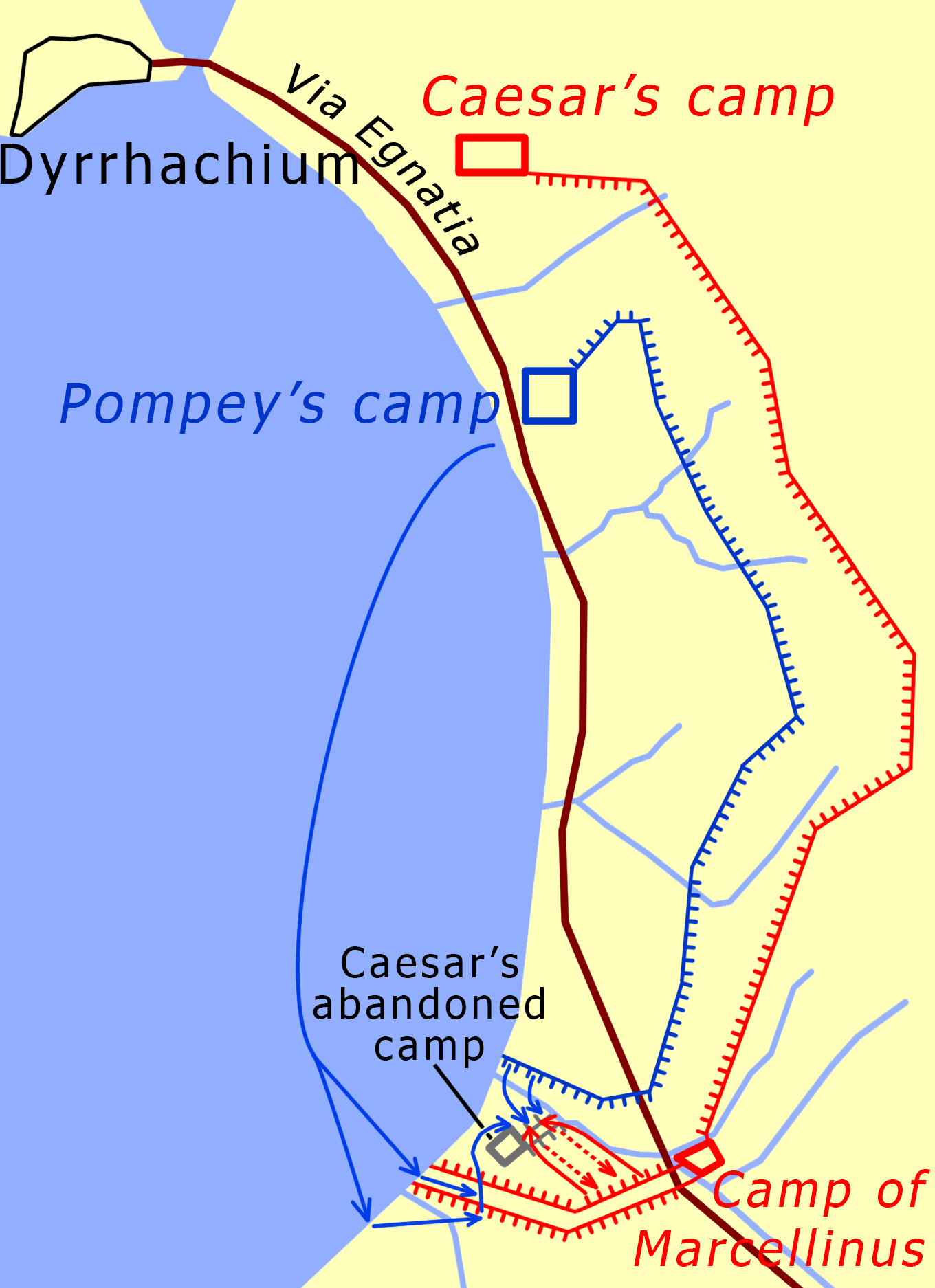
- Caesar's forces Pompey's forces
Date	10 July 48 BC
Location	Dyrrhachium (modern Durrës) 41.3167°N 19.4500°E
Result	Pompeian victory

Belligerents
Pompeians	Caesarians

Commanders and leaders
Pompey; Titus Labienus; Aegus (Note: Aegus and Roscillus fought on the Caesarian side initially but defected to the Pompeian faction during the battle.); Roscillus	Julius Caesar; Mark Antony; Publius Sulla; Aegus; Roscillus

Strength
50,000	28,000

Casualties and losses
2,000+	1,000–4,000 (Note: 1,000 according to Caesar himself, 1,000 according to Plutarch in his Life of Caesar but 2,000 according to the same author in his Life of Pompey. 4,000 according to Orosius. Some sources might have taken into account the Caesarian prisoners killed after the battle.)

The Battle of Dyrrachium (or Dyrrhachium) took place from April to late July 48 BC near the city of Dyrrachium (modern-day Durrës) in what is now Albania. It was fought between Gaius Julius Caesar and an army led by Gnaeus Pompey during Caesar's civil war.

Caesar attempted to capture the vital Pompeian logistics hub of Dyrrachium, but was unsuccessful after Pompey occupied it and the surrounding heights. In response, Caesar besieged Pompey's camp and constructed a circumvallation thereof, until after months of skirmishes, Pompey was able to break through Caesar's fortified lines, forcing Caesar to make a strategic retreat into Thessaly.

After the battle, Pompey pursued Caesar into Thessaly and then towards Pharsalus, where the decisive battle of Caesar's Greek campaign would be fought.

== Background ==
Starting in 49 BC, Julius Caesar had crossed the Rubicon and started a civil war in the Roman Republic. Starting in January with a lightning advance against the Pompeian and senatorial forces in Italy, Pompey withdrew across the Adriatic for Rome's eastern provinces. Following Caesar's defeat of Pompey's legates in Spain, Caesar turned east and crossed the Adriatic in January 48 BC.

As Pompey raised troops in the east, Caesar needed to strike quickly: he moved some of his troops across the Adriatic but was intercepted, stranding him with seven legions in Greece while the rest of his army remained in Brundisium under Mark Antony. Seeking supplies, Caesar attempted to seize Dyrrachium – a major Pompeian supply hub – but withdrew when Pompey arrived in the city first. In early April, Antony and his reinforcements were able to join Caesar's manoeuvres against Pompey outside Dyrrachium.

== Siege ==
Caesar first attempted to offer battle with Pompey, but was rebuffed, with Pompey seeking to wear down Caesar's forces with hunger; in response, Caesar attempted again to capture Dyrrachium, which remained logistically vital.

At Dyrrachium, Pompey held a strong defensive position; his back was guarded by the sea, and at his front there were hills that commanded the immediate area. There, Pompey established his camp on the top of a rocky outcrop called Petra overlooking a natural harbour from which he could be resupplied by sea. Caesar's camp, however, was on high ground inland, which forced his troops to rely on forage. Caesar started a contravallation: to prevent Pompey from getting fodder for his animals, to render his cavalry ineffective and thus protect his own foraging parties, and to reduce Pompey's standing in the eyes of the foreigners and his own men by putting him on the defensive and making him openly refuse battle. In response, Pompey also started construction of a fortified line facing Caesar. On completion, the interior Pompeian line stretched some fifteen Roman miles with twenty-four forts, while Caesar's exterior line stretched some 17 miles.

While Caesar lacked for food during the winter – reckoning by natural seasons rather than the out-of-sync Roman calendar – he cut off the streams sustaining the Pompeian water supply; the supply situation led to outbreaks of camp disease as well. As Caesar continued his fortified encirclement, hoping to force Pompey either to withdraw by sea, break out, or watch his army wither away, skirmishes and raids against the fortified lines continued.

Pompey decided to try to lure Caesar away from the fortifications by means of a false message that some of the inhabitants of Dyrrachium were prepared to betray the town to him, and meanwhile launch a three-pronged attack against forts in the centre of the siege-line. At two of these forts one cohort under Lucius Minucius Basilus and three cohorts under Gaius Volcatius Tullus put up stiff resistance (Note: Caesar's Commentaries proudly reported that after a day of hard fighting virtually all of the defenders were wounded but not willing to give up. Most had been wounded by missiles – 30,000 arrows are said to have been collected after the attack. Four out of six centurions in one cohort were said to have been hit in the face and lost an eye. The shield of one centurion, a man named Scaeva, had been hit by 120 missiles. At one point he pretended to surrender only to kill the two Pompeian soldiers who came to take him into custody. Scaeva and his men, as well as all the others, stood their ground and eventually none dared to advance on them anymore. Caesar rewarded all the men who had so bravely defended his siege works – Scaeva was promoted to primus pilus, the senior centurion of the legion, and given a bounty of 200,000 sestertii.) against five of Pompey's legions until they were relieved by a force of two legions from the main camp under Publius Cornelius Sulla The Pompeians became cut off on a hill-top between the two lines for five days before Pompey could withdraw them. Caesar reckoned the Pompeian losses at two thousand.

It was difficult, however, for Caesar's forces to hold a longer line than his numerically superior enemy, leading him to deploy aggressively before, but out of range of, the enemy walls: Pompey was forced similarly to respond with a similar force concentration.

== Battle ==
It was at this point that two of Caesar's Gallic cavalry officers, the noblemen Roucillus and Egus (Note: They were the sons of the main chieftains of the Allobroges from Transalpine Gaul and had served in Caesar's army for many years, leading a contingent of tribal cavalry with some distinction.), defected from Caesar to Pompey to escape punishment for embezzlement. Through them Pompey discovered a weakness in the southernmost sector of Caesar's lines and prepared for a major attack to break through Caesar's fortified lines. Pompey executed a three-pronged attack; six legions launched a frontal assault on the fortifications, while light infantry and archers landed behind the rear wall and between the two; the initial attack was successful with the Ninth legion routed as was a small relief force which came to their aid; the position only held when Antony brought up twelve cohorts, followed by further reserves led by Caesar personally. While the Ninth's fort held, Pompey built a camp in the area and also secured lines of communication into the hinterland.

After Pompey's forces occupied a relatively exposed fortified encampment that had previously been abandoned by the Caesarians, Caesar launched an attack against it. The attack, plagued by confused directions, was a costly failure for Caesar, sending his men into a hasty retreat with losses of some 960 men and more than 32 officers. While Pompey held the field, he ordered a halt. Caesar remarked on that decision saying, "[Pompey's forces] would have won today, if only they were commanded by a winner".

In the aftermath, Titus Labienus, a trusted lieutenant of Caesar's during the Gallic wars who had deserted to Pompey at the start of the civil war, had the Caesarian prisoners executed before the enemy lines.

== Aftermath ==
Tactically, Caesar's position was substantially weakened: Pompey had captured one of the ends of his fortified line and Caesar would not be able to construct an even longer line to encircle Pompey's extended fortifications. In response, Caesar withdrew to Apollonia under cover of darkness, leaving two legions to deceive the Pompeians into thinking they were still present. When this was discovered, Pompey sent cavalry in pursuit, but they were held off in a skirmish with Caesar's rear-guard.

By this time it was summer and Caesar made way for areas not yet visited by foraging parties, meaning that they would be able to support more prolonged operations. After being denied entrance to Gomphi by its city magistrates, who did not want to aid a leader seemingly likely to lose the war, Caesar had his men sack the city as a successful example of ruthlessness.

In a broader sense, the Pompeians elated at the victory, being the first time in the civil war that Caesar had suffered a non-trivial defeat. Men like Domitius Ahenobarbus urged Pompey to bring Caesar to decisive battle and crush him; others urged a return to Rome and Italy to retake the capital. Pompey remained steadfast in believing that committing to a pitched battle was both unwise and unnecessary, deciding on strategic patience to wait for reinforcements from Syria and to exploit Caesar's weak supply lines. The elation of victory turned into overconfidence and mutual suspicion, putting significant pressure on Pompey to provoke a final encounter with the enemy. Beginning to place too much trust in his forces and under the influence of overconfident officers, he chose to engage Caesar in Thessaly shortly after being reinforced from Syria.

== General References ==
- Goldsworthy, Adrian (2002). Caesar's Civil War: 49–44 BC. Oxford: Osprey Publishing. ISBN 1-84176-392-6.
