= Publius Autronius Paetus =

Publius Autronius Paetus was a politician of the late Roman Republic who was involved in the conspiracy of Catiline.

== Career ==
He was elected consul in 66 BC (to serve in 65 BC), alongside Publius Cornelius Sulla, but before they could take office both were accused of electoral corruption by Lucius Aurelius Cotta and Lucius Manlius Torquatus. Dio 36.44.3-5 says they were found guilty, their election was declared void, and their accusers were elected consuls in their place.

Some sources claim that Autronius conspired with Catiline to murder Cotta and Torquatus on the day of their installation, January 1, 65 BC, but the plot collapsed when Catiline gave the signal before all the conspirators were assembled. However, this conspiracy is not described consistently in contemporary sources. Modern historians doubt this account, and question whether this conspiracy actually existed. Later, Autronius was implicated in Catiline's failed conspiracy of 63 BC, and, after his old friend Cicero refused to defend him, he was convicted and sent into exile in Epirus. When Cicero himself was exiled in 58 BC, he was concerned that Autronius might attempt to kill him.

== Family ==
Paetus's wife is not mentioned by name but since the speech Pro Sulla refers to him as a "propinquus" of the Claudii Marcelli it is possible that she was a Claudia Marcella or a Junia. This is supported further by inscriptions of freedmen of his son Lucius Autronius Paetus's which are located in and around the monumentum familiae Marcellae.

== See also ==
- Autronia gens
