= Volumnia Cytheris =

Ancient Roman actress and dancer

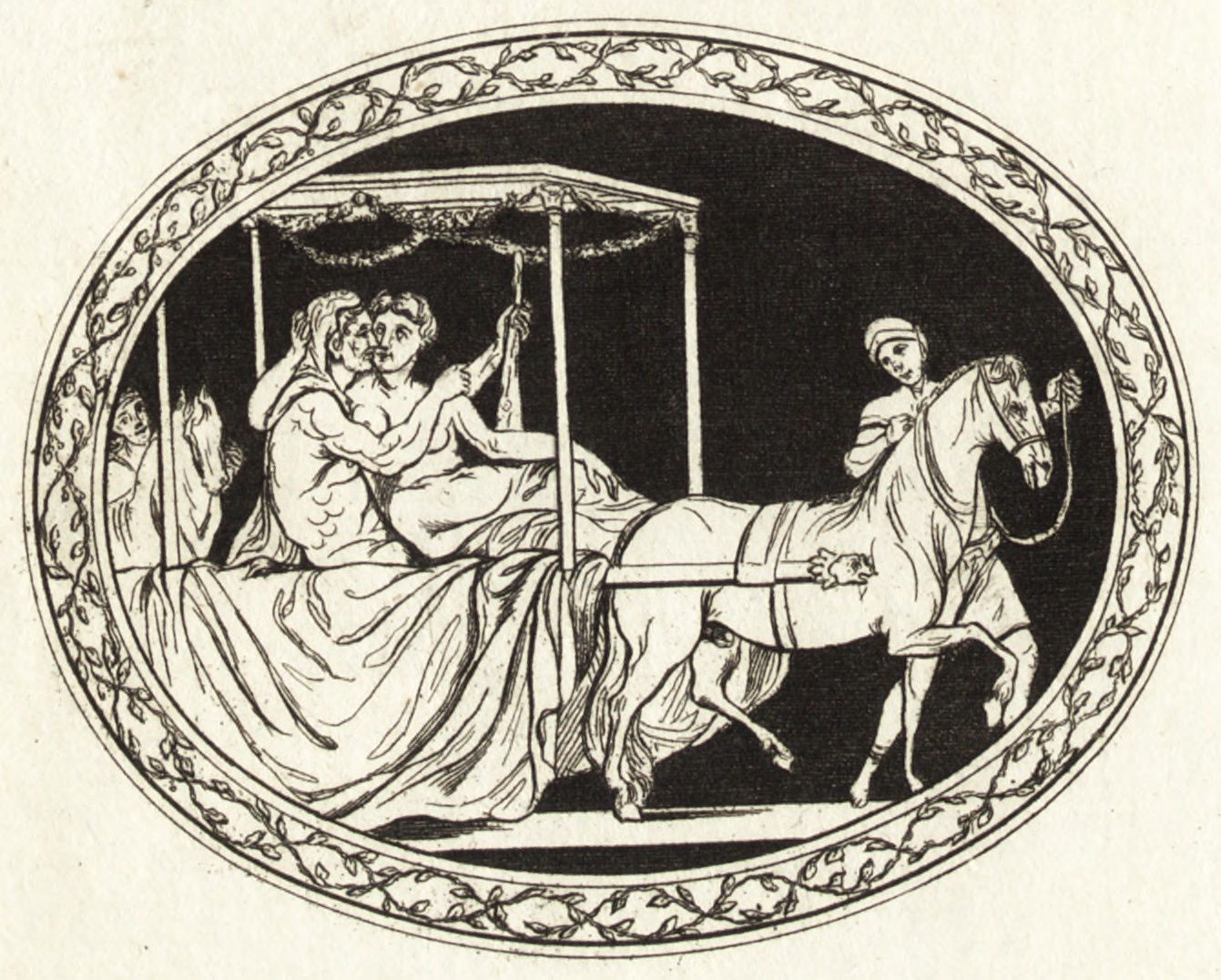
Imaginary depiction of Mark Antony dressed as Hercules riding a chariot with Cytheris dressed as Iole. Pierre d'Hancarville, Monumens de la vie privée des douze Césars, 1782

Volumnia Cytheris (fl. 1st-century BC) was an ancient Roman actress and mimae dancer. She is foremost known as the mistress of several famous Romans.

Possibly born around 70 B.C., she was originally a slave of Publius Volumnius Eutrapelius but later became a freedwoman. On stage, she was normally referred to only as Cytheris. The name derived from "Cythera" a nickname for Aphrodite. She had relationships with Brutus and Mark Antony, which attracted a lot of attention in contemporary ancient Rome. She is mentioned as the companion of her aristocratic lovers in social occasions when the presence of a courtesan was otherwise not common, and considered shocking.

Cicero's letters recount how embarrassed he was to go to a party that she also attended, and how offensive it was for Mark Antony to give her a place of dignity in his litter:

"The tribune of the people was borne along in a chariot, lictors crowned with laurel preceded him; among whom, on an open litter, was carried an actress; whom honourable men, citizens of the different municipalities, coming out from their towns under compulsion to meet him, saluted not by the name by which she was well known on the stage, but by that of Volumnia. A car followed full of pimps; then a lot of debauched companions; and then his mother, utterly neglected, followed the mistress of her profligate son, as if she had been her daughter-in-law. O the disastrous fecundity of that miserable woman! With the marks of such wickedness as this did that fellow stamp every municipality, and prefecture, and colony, and, in short, the whole of Italy."

Later, Cicero's wife asked Cytheris to help mend the relationship between her husband and Cytheris' lover Mark Antony, so that he could return from exile in Brundisium.

Her rejection of Cornelius Gallus reportedly provided the theme for Virgil's tenth Eclogue. Gallus refers to her in his work under the name Lycoris, which alludes to one of the names "Lycoreus" the god Apollo, Greek god of music.

She is one of few free influential Roman courtesans mentioned by her contemporaries, others being Praecia and Chelidon. Cytheris' fate is unknown and she is not mentioned in any sources after a certain point.

== See also ==
- Tertia (actress)
