= Marcus Herennius Picens (consul 34 BC) =

Marcus Herennius Picens (fl. 1st century BC) was a Roman senator who served as suffect consul in 34 BC, replacing Gaius Memmius and occupying the office from November 1 to the end of December.

Authorities give slightly different versions of his name. T.R.S. Broughton and Ronald Syme refer to him simply as Marcus Herennius; however, K.M.T. Atkinson adds the cognomen Picens when she writes about him.

== Biography ==
Herennius is a native of Picenum, which Syme notes provided several supporters for Julius Caesar, including Publius Ventidius. Syme identifies this Herennius as the grandson of Titus Herennius, who fought against the Romans during the Social War.

How Herennius supported the cause of Caesar's heir Augustus is unclear; Syme includes his name in a list of several consuls "who have left no record of service to the rulers of Rome but, as sole and sufficient proof, the presence of their names upon the Fasti." Despite this enigma, Herennius proceeded to the office of proconsular governor of Asia; although Broughton dated this to 33/32 BC, Atkinson has argued 28/27 BC better fits.

Herennius was the patron of the town of Veii. He was probably the father of Marcus Herennius Picens, suffect consul in AD 1.

== Sources ==
- Broughton, T. Robert S., The Magistrates of the Roman Republic, Vol I (1951)
- Broughton, T. Robert S., The Magistrates of the Roman Republic, Vol III (1986)
- Syme, Ronald, The Roman Revolution (1939)

Political offices
Preceded by Gaius Memmius	Suffect consul of the Roman Republic; 34 BC with Paullus Aemilius Lepidus	Succeeded by Augustus II and Lucius Volcatius Tullus
