= Tertia (actress) =

Ancient Roman actress and dancer

Tertia (died after 74 BC) was an ancient Roman actress and dancer.

Tertia was born on Sicily as the daughter of the dancer-actor Isidorus. She is famous in history as the mistress of Verres, after he was appointed governor of Sicily in 74 BC.

The relationship attracted a scandal and was brought up in court during the corruption trial against Verres. Her alleged influence and position is known from the speech Verrine Orations. Verres caused a scandal by showing himself openly with Tertia in public, allowing her to act as his hostess during public functions and introducing her to local dignitaries and aristocracy, which was regarded as scandalous because of the low social status of stage artists. He also arranged a marriage between her and one of his clients.

It was reportedly Tertia and a courtesan named Pippa who introduced Verres to the courtesan Chelidon, who were alleged to have great political influence upon his tenure as urban praetor.

== See also ==
- Volumnia Cytheris
