= Manius Acilius Glabrio (consul 67 BC) =

Consul of the Roman Republic in 67 BCE

Manius Acilius Glabrio was a Roman statesman and general, grandson of the jurist Publius Mucius Scaevola.

When Glabrio was serving as urban praetor in 70 BC, he presided over the trial of Verres. In 67 he was consul together with Gaius Calpurnius Piso. The two consuls proposed the Lex Acilia Calpurnia against bribery during canvassing for elections.

In the same year Manius Acilius was appointed to replace Lucius Licinius Lucullus, who was unable to control his soldiers, as proconsul of Cilicia and the command of the Third Mithridatic War against Mithradates VI of Pontus and Tigranes the Great of Armenia. While he was on his way to Pontus Mithridates won back almost all his kingdom and caused havoc in Cappadocia, which was allied with Rome and which had been left undefended. Manius Acilius did not march on Cappadocia nor Pontus but delayed in Bithynia. The lex Manilia proposed by the plebeian tribune Gaius Manilius gave the command of the war to Pompey, who replaced Acilius. Little else is known of Manius Acilius except that he declared in favor of capital punishment for the Catilinarian conspirators.

== See also ==
- Acilia gens

== Citations ==
Political offices
Preceded by Lucius Caecilius Metellus; Quintus Marcius Rex	Roman consul 67 BC with Gaius Calpurnius Piso	Succeeded by Manius Aemilius Lepidus; Lucius Volcatius Tullus
