= Praecia =

Roman prostitute

Praecia (fl. 73 BC) was a Roman courtesan, famed for her influence within Roman politics.

She was active as a professional high class courtesan in Rome. She was known for her wide net of high-profile clients among the political elite, and for using her contacts to benefit the political careers of her clients, which made her a popular and valuable figure in contemporary political life. A known example of her activity was when she was asked by her client Lucullus to ask her other client Publius Cornelius Cethegus to appoint Lucullus governor of Cilicia, a task she performed successfully.

She is one of few free influential Roman courtesans mentioned by her contemporaries, others being Volumnia Cytheris and Chelidon.
