= Quintus Caecilius Metellus Creticus =

Roman statesman, general, consul, and conqueror of Crete (c. 114 BC – late 50s BC)

Quintus Caecilius Metellus Creticus (c. 114 BC – late 50s BC) was a politically active member of the Roman upper class. He was praetor in 74 BC and pontifex from 73 BC until his death. He was consul in 69 BC along with Quintus Hortensius Hortalus.

== Family ==
The Caecilii Metelli were very prominent and conservative members of the Roman nobility in the Republican period, though they were members of the plebeian gens Caecilia. Their greatest influence was from the second century BC onwards. The name Metellus possibly means 'mercenary'. A saying attributed to Naevius stated that "it is fated for the Metelli to become consuls at Rome," and it seems to be true: Creticus' brother, father, grandfather, three uncles, great grandfather, and great great grandfather were all consuls.

Quintus Caecilius Metellus Macedonicus was Creticus' grandfather. He was praetor in 148 BC, and was granted command in Macedonia the following year. There, he defeated Andriscus, a pretender to the throne, for which he received a triumph and the cognomen 'Macedonicus'. He was consul in 143 BC and censor in 131 BC. Macedonicus, as a conservative aristocrat, opposed Tiberius Gracchus and Gaius Gracchus. Each of his four sons became consul.

Creticus' father was Gaius Caecilius Metellus Caprarius, the youngest son of Macedonicus. In 133 BC he served under Scipio Aemilianus in Numantia. Caprarius was praetor in 117 BC, consul in 113 BC, and fought as proconsul in Thrace in 112 BC. He received a triumph for his victory in Thrace in 111 BC. He was censor in 102 BC.

Creticus had two brothers. One was Lucius Caecilius Metellus. He was praetor in 71 BC and governor of Sicily in 70 BC. He died in office as consul in 68 BC. The other was Marcus Caecilius Metellus, praetor. In 69 BC he presided over the quaestio de repetundis, a standing tribunal of senatorial iudices (juror-judges) for investigating and deciding cases of extortion.

Creticus' sister, Caecilia Metella, was the wife of Gaius Verres, who was governor of Sicily from 73 BC to 71 BC.

Creticus' daughter was also named Caecilia Metella. She married Marcus Licinius Crassus who was a son of Marcus Crassus, a member of the "First Triumvirate". Caecilia Metella's tomb still survives on the Via Appia.

== Career ==
=== Role in Verres's trial ===
In Cicero's speech Against Verres, delivered in late 70 BC, Cicero, the attorney prosecuting on behalf of the province of Sicily, denounces Gaius Verres, the defendant on trial, in the extortion court. Verres was the Governor of Sicily from 73 to 71 BC, and the Sicilians charged him with being morally corrupt and flagrant with bribery, as well as having stolen 40 million sesterces worth of money and items from Sicily. They also charged him with having killed Roman citizens without trial, something forbidden by Roman law. Metellus and Quintus Hortensius Hortalus were to be the two consuls for the coming year. They were both friends of Verres, as well as strong supporters; Hortensius acted as his defence lawyer. In addition, Metellus's brothers were well-placed to influence the trial: Marcus was to be president of the extortion court in the coming year, and Lucius was already in Verres's old position as Governor of Sicily. The defence planned to delay the trial until the following year, when the Metellus brothers and Hortensius would be able to influence the court's decision. Confident of victory, Metellus sent for the Sicilian witnesses and told them that Verres would come to no harm due to the positions held by himself and his brothers. Because of this, Cicero accuses Metellus of being corrupt to the point that he would "throw duty and dignity to the winds" without even having a real connection to Verres. Cicero goes on to suggest twice that Metellus won his office due to Verres's bribery rather than by fate (relating the proverb), and tries to turn Metellus against Verres by stating that Verres proclaimed it so himself.

=== The conflict with Crete ===
According to Constantine VII Porphyrogenitus, Crete was aiding Mithridates, king of Pontus, by supplying him with mercenaries in the first century BC. Mithridates was then at war with Rome, and was proving to be a very difficult opponent. The Cretans also contributed to and were in alliance with the pirates of the Mediterranean. Pirates were a terrible problem in the Mediterranean at that time; they added the risk of kidnapping to sailing, pilfered grain from shipments to Rome, and attacked ports. Marcus Antonius Creticus, father of Marc Antony, sent legates to Crete concerning their involvement with Mithridates and the pirates; the Cretans dismissed the matter, and a war began. In an attempt at a peace treaty, the Romans demanded the surrender of Lasthenes, Crete's commander against the Romans, along with all of the Romans the Cretans held prisoner, all of their pirate ships, three hundred hostages, and four thousand talents of silver. The island of Crete refused to meet these terms.

After his consulship, Metellus was given the proconsular command against the pirates on Crete; his co-consul, Hortensius, had refused it. Metellus defeated Lasthenes at Kydonia, with Lasthenes fleeing to Knossos. Panares, Lasthenes's fellow strategos, surrendered Kydonia to the Romans. Metellus marched to Knossos and started a siege. The Cretans then appealed to Pompey the Great. They did this in 67 BC, when Pompey had control over the Mediterranean to eliminate piracy under the Lex Gabinia. The Cretans offered to surrender to Pompey, convinced that he would be less harsh than Metellus. Pompey ignored Metellus' command over the island and accepted the Cretans' surrender, and he even sent a military delegation to the last-stand stronghold of Lasthénis and Panáres, at Láppa. Pompey ordered Metellus to leave the island with his troops, but Metellus refused. Metellus then defeated the Cretans, conquered Lappa in spite of the presence of Pompey's Romans there, and swiftly declared the island a Roman province.

Because of Metellus's refusal to leave Crete when Pompey ordered it, Pompey and his allies prevented his triumph until 62 BC. Upon celebrating his triumph, Metellus received the cognomen 'Creticus', the Latin word for 'Cretan'. As revenge for the opposition to his triumph, Metellus used his influence to prevent the ratification in the senate of Pompey's reorganization of the east until 60 BC. Metellus remained a prominent member of Pompey's opposition until his death in the late 50s BC.

=== Gaul ===
According to Cicero in his letters to Atticus, Creticus was an ambassador sent to Gaul in the hopes of preventing the Gallic states from joining the Aedui in 60 BC. He was sent along with Lucius Flaccus and Lentulus.

== Other references ==
In his speech Post Reditum in Senatu ('in the senate after his return'), Cicero, having been exiled for executing Roman citizens without a trial during the Catilinarian Conspiracy, celebrated his return to Rome. He was aided in this, albeit reluctantly, by the consul Quintus Caecilius Metellus Nepos, a relative of Creticus. Cicero praises Nepos for being truly noble and naturally excellent in disposition, although he claims them to be enemies. Cicero goes on to praise the Metelli as a group for being exemplary citizens.

In Juvenal's eighth satire, he speaks about virtue alone making one truly noble, rather than an inherited name. He uses a few cognomens to illustrate his point, including that of Quintus Caecilius Metellus Creticus.

== Sources ==
- Grant, Michael. Cicero: Selected Works. London: Penguin Books. 1960. 45–47.
- Hornblower, Simon and Anthony Spawforth. The Oxford Classical Dictionary, 3rd Edition. New York: Oxford University Press. 1996. 269.
- Humphries, Rolfe. The Satires of Juvenal. Bloomington: Indiana University Press. 1958. 102.
- Salazar, Christine F. Brill's New Pauly: Encyclopedia of the Ancient World, Vol. 2. Boston: Brill Leiden. 2003. 874–879.
- Watson, John Selby. Eutropius: Abridgement of Roman History. London: Henry G. Bohn. 1853. 6.11.
- Winstedt, E.O. Cicero: Letters to Atticus. Cambridge: Harvard University Press. 1912. 83.
- The Conquest of Crete from Constantine VII Porphyrogenitus: The Embassies. livius.org
- Yonge, C.D. Post Reditum in Senatu. London: Henry G. Bohn. 1856.

| Preceded by Gn. Pompeius Magnus; M. Licinius Crassus | Consul of the Roman Republic; 69 BC; With: Quintus Hortensius | Succeeded by L. Caecilius Metellus; Q. Marcius Rex |
