= Lucius Manlius Torquatus (consul 65 BC) =

Roman consul in 65 BC

Lucius Manlius Torquatus was a consul of the Roman Republic in 65 BC, elected after the condemnation of Publius Cornelius Sulla and Publius Autronius Paetus.

== Biography ==
Torquatus belonged to the patrician gens Manlii, one of the oldest Roman houses. He was proquaestor in Asia under Lucius Cornelius Sulla in 84 BC, for whom he issued gold and silver coinage. He returned to Rome with Sulla in 82 BC where he fought at the Battle of the Colline Gate. He was elected Praetor by 68 BC, and was possibly a legate under Pompey before taking up his new post of propraetor of the Roman province of Asia in 67 BC.

In 66 BC, Torquatus stood for election as Roman consul, but was defeated by Publius Cornelius Sulla and Publius Autronius Paetus. However, Torquatus and Lucius Aurelius Cotta accused the consul designates for the following year of bribery in connection with the elections; they were condemned under the Lex Acilia Calpurnia, and Cotta and Torquatus elected in their places. This, allegedly, led to the so-called First Catilinian Conspiracy where Catiline, together with Gnaeus Calpurnius Piso, Autronius, and Sulla, conspired to murder the new consuls on 1 January 65 BC, when they were due to enter office. Autronius and Sulla were to install themselves as consuls, while Piso was to take possession of the provinces of Hispania. The plot failed when the Senate became suspicious and issued bodyguards to the incoming consuls. However, during Catiline's trial for corruption when he was governor of Africa in 65 BC, he was supported by Torquatus, and an investigation undertaken by the consul into the circumstances of the aborted plot was inconclusive.

In 64 BC, Torquatus obtained Macedonia as his allotted proconsular province and while there was awarded the title of Imperator by the Senate on the recommendation of Cicero when Cicero reported Torquatus's achievements to the Senate. By the autumn of 63 BC he was back in Rome. He took an active part in suppressing the Second Catilinarian conspiracy late that year, and he also supported Cicero when Cicero was banished in 58 BC.

Torquatus was married to a woman from Asculum. He had at least one son, Lucius Manlius Torquatus who died during Caesar's Civil War. He may also have had a daughter who married Gnaeus Domitius Ahenobarbus.

== See also ==
- List of Roman consuls

== Sources ==
- T. Robert S. Broughton, The Magistrates of the Roman Republic, Vol II (1952).
- Holmes, T. Rice, The Roman Republic and the Founder of the Empire, Vol. I (1923)
- Syme, Ronald, The Roman Revolution, Clarendon Press, Oxford, 1939.
- Anthon, Charles & Smith, William, A New Classical Dictionary of Greek and Roman Biography, Mythology and Geography (1860).

Political offices
Preceded by Manius Aemilius Lepidus and Lucius Volcatius Tullus	Consul of the Roman Republic with Lucius Aurelius Cotta; 65 BC	Succeeded by Lucius Julius Caesar and Gaius Marcius Figulus
