= Publius Cornelius Cethegus (political boss) =

Roman senator and political boss

Publius Cornelius Cethegus (c. 131 BC – before 66 BC) was a politician of the Roman Republic. During the civil wars of the 80s BC, he was originally a partisan of Gaius Marius, but survived the purges of the political class by defecting to the eventual victor, Sulla, whose favor he endeavored to win by treacherously abetting in the massacre of several thousand prisoners of war. Although he was regarded as a moral reprobate with a dissolute lifestyle, Cethegus became in the 70s BC a leading figure in the Roman Senate as a master of intrigue and manipulation, to the extent that the most eminent men of the state vied for his favor. He played a key behind-the-scenes role in the allotment of important provincial governorships and military commands in the year 74 BC, and probably died not long afterwards.

== Life ==
=== Civil wars (80s BC) ===
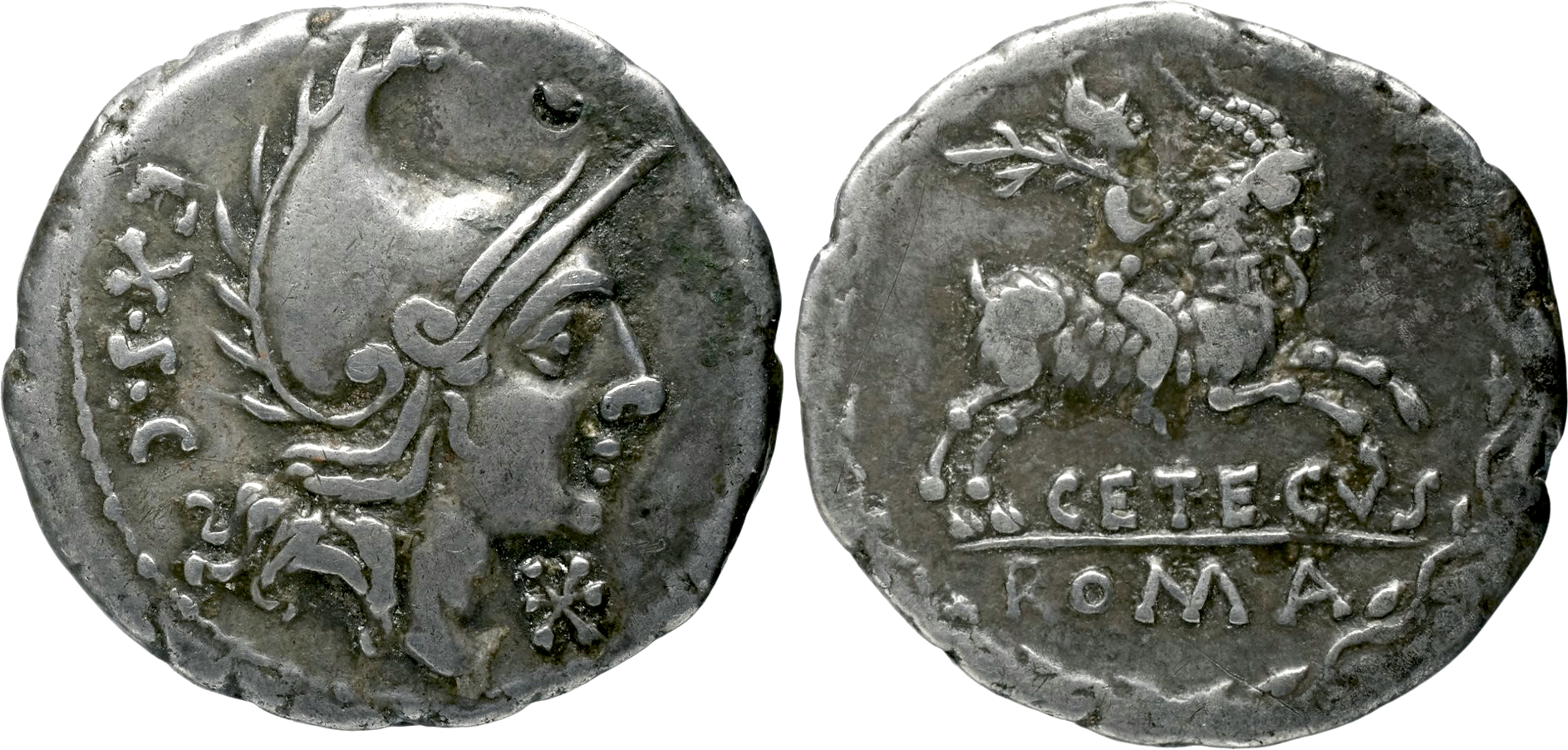
Denarius of Cethegus' father, minted in 115–114 BC. The obverse shows the head of Roma with a Phrygian helmet, while the reverse possibly depicts young Dionysus riding a he-goat. It is the only known specimen, now in the Cabinet des Médailles, Paris.

Born around 131 BC, Publius Cornelius Cethegus belonged to a patrician family which had not been recently prominent, and has been described as a decayed aristocrat with a mind for politics. The numismatist Michael Crawford tentatively identified one 'Cetegus', a moneyer who minted coins in 115 or 114 BC, as his father. Publius Cethegus first comes to note as a strong political supporter of Gaius Marius, and was one of the men whom Marius's enemy, Sulla, outlawed after marching on Rome and taking control of the government by force in 88 BC. Declared a public enemy, Cethegus, alongside Marius and other fellow outlaws, fled to Africa, but returned to Rome the following year, after Sulla and his army had left Italy to fight the Mithridatic War in the east.

Cethegus presumably stayed in Rome during the period 87–83 BC, when Marius and (after his death) his political successors dominated the government, and may have held high office, perhaps the praetorship. He nevertheless deserted to his old enemy, Sulla, when the latter returned with his army from the east in 83. Seeking to win Sulla's favor, Cethegus joined the victorious conqueror at the siege of Praeneste in 82, and there helped him organize a large-scale massacre of Marian prisoners of war by giving them false assurances of safety. It is unknown if Cethegus profited from Sulla's proscriptions, but he is found as the target of a speech in 77 BC by the senator Lucius Marcius Philippus, who accused him of supporting the rebellious general Lepidus in order to profit from prolonged civil strife.

=== Political boss (70s BC) ===
Although Cethegus was regarded as of low moral character and unsavory in his lifestyle choices, he acquired much influence in the Roman Senate during the post-Sullan era as a master of intrigue and manipulation. He came to command a bloc of senatorial support large enough to swing contentious votes in the house, to the extent that the most prominent men of the state vied for his favor. His contemporary Cicero, although thinking of him as a poor speaker, noted that Cethegus's eloquence in, and knowledge of, state affairs caused his auctoritas to rival that of former consuls. Keaveney takes this to mean that Cethegus achieved this by co-opting the rank-and-file members of the Senate, inconsequential and politically unskilled men who relied on him for guidance. They had significantly increased in number during Sulla's dictatorship, providing Cethegus with a large voting base in the house.

Ronald Syme notes that Cethegus "was the author of (or was subsequently credited with) various pieces of jobbery in the year 74". He collaborated together with the consul Marcus Aurelius Cotta to secure for the praetor Marcus Antonius a commission to combat piracy in the eastern Mediterranean. Several men also paid court to Cethegus in hope using his influence for obtaining the vacant governorship of Cilicia. Among the aspiring applicants for the office was the other consul of the year, Lucius Licinius Lucullus. Although he and Cethegus despised each other, Lucullus successfully lobbied Praecia, an influential courtesan whom Cethegus favored greatly, to have Cethegus act on his behalf.

Another recorded act of Cethegus that same year was the help he gave to a senator, Staienus, who had been accused of corruption. The two men were said to dislike each other, but Staienus was desperate enough to pay for Cethegus's help, which turned out to be useless advice. Although Cethegus's action was later denounced as deceitful by Cicero in 66 BC (by which time Cethegus was probably dead), others believed that Staienus's position was hopeless anyway and Cethegus's advice was the best that could be offered. Syme believed Cethegus died not long after this incident.
