= Chelidon (courtesan) =

Chelidon (fl. 74 BC) was a Roman courtesan, famed for her influence during the praetorship of Gaius Verres.

She was a freedwoman and a successful professional high class courtesan. She was introduced to Gaius Verres by the courtesan Pippa and Tertia (actress), and became his mistress.

She became known for the influence she wielded over public affairs in 74 BC, when her lover Gaius Verres served as urban praetor of Rome. Her influence was used against Gaius Verres by his enemies, who accused him of allowing her an excessive influence over state affairs. Allegedly, she acted as the political advisor of Gaius Verres, who allowed her to make decisions within civil cases and prepare laws and political reforms. Aware of her de facto position, she was courted by supplicants and political officials.

She died between 73 and 71 BC, when Verres apparently received an inheritance from her.

She is one of few free influential Roman courtesans mentioned by her contemporaries, others being Volumnia Cytheris and Praecia.
