= Lucius Autronius Paetus =

Lucius Autronius Paetus (fl. 1st century BC) was a Roman senator who was appointed suffect consul in 33 BC.

== Biography ==
Autronius Paetus was the son of Publius Autronius Paetus, who had been elected Roman consul for 65 BC, but was convicted of electoral fraud prior to entering office. A supporter of Octavianus, he was appointed suffect consul on 1 January 33 BC, replacing Octavianus on his first day as consul. Then in 29/28 BC, he was appointed the proconsular governor of Africa, during which time he was acclaimed imperator by his troops, for which he celebrated a triumph in 28 BC.

== Sources ==
- Broughton, T. Robert S., The Magistrates of the Roman Republic, Vol II (1952)
- Broughton, T. Robert S., The Magistrates of the Roman Republic, Vol III (1986)
- Syme, Ronald, "The Augustan Aristocracy" (1986). Clarendon Press.

Political offices
Preceded by Gaius Julius Caesar Octavianus II	Suffect Consul of the Roman Empire; 33 BC with Lucius Volcatius Tullus	Succeeded by Lucius Flavius (suffect)
