= Lucius Volcatius Tullus (consul 66 BC) =

1st century BC Roman politician

Lucius Volcatius Tullus was a Roman politician who became consul in 66 BC alongside Manius Aemilius Lepidus.

== Biography ==
Although he failed to be elected Aedile, Tullus was elected to the office of Praetor by 69 BC, and possibly Curator Viarum in 68 BC, before being elected consul in 66 BC. During his consulate, it was brought to his attention that Catiline was intending to seek the consulship for 65 BC. As Publius Clodius Pulcher had declared he was intending to prosecute Catiline on charges of corruption while Catiline was governor of Africa, Tullus, after consultation with leading senators, and with the support of Marcus Licinius Crassus and Julius Caesar, refused to accept Catiline's nomination for the consulate with such charges hanging over his head. With the unravelling of the second Catilinian conspiracy, he approved of Cicero’s measures against Catiline's accomplices, and spoke up in support of Cicero in the Senate.

In 56 BC, Tullus gave his support to the group who were pushing to grant Pompey a special commission to bring about the restoration of Ptolemy XII Auletes in Egypt. In 54 BC, he was one of the consulars who supported Marcus Aemilius Scaurus, who was standing trial for extortion. Largely abandoning politics after his consulate, he tried to stand aloof when the conflict between Pompey and Julius Caesar reached a crisis point in late 50 BC. In January 49 BC, he proposed sending peace envoys to Caesar to try to defuse the situation. He, like many other senators, obeyed Pompey's instructions and fled Rome, but returned when Caesar summoned all members of the Senate to return. Beyond this, he took no part in the struggle, but remained quietly in Italy. Cicero, however, noted that he was an enemy of Gaius Claudius Marcellus, whom Caesar pardoned in 45 BC.

Tullus was the father of Lucius Volcatius Tullus, who was consul in 33 BC.

== Sources ==
- T. Robert S. Broughton, The Magistrates of the Roman Republic, Vol II (1952).
- Holmes, T. Rice, The Roman Republic and the Founder of the Empire, Vol. I (1923)
- Holmes, T. Rice, The Roman Republic and the Founder of the Empire, Vol. III (1923)
- Smith, William (1849). Dictionary of Greek and Roman Biography & Mythology. Vol. III.

Political offices
Preceded by G. Calpurnius Piso; M'. Acilius Glabrio	Consul of the Roman Republic; 66 BC; With: M'. Aemilius Lepidus	Succeeded by L. Aurelius Cotta; L. Manlius Torquatus
