= Gaius Verres =

Roman politician, enemy of Cicero

Gaius Verres (c. 114 – 43 BC) was a Roman magistrate, notorious for his misgovernment of Sicily. His extortion of local farmers and plundering of temples led to his prosecution by Cicero, whose accusations were so devastating that Verres' defence advocate could only recommend that he should leave the country. Cicero's prosecution speeches were later published as the Verrines.

== Biography ==
Gaius Verres was born around 114 BC.

=== Public career ===
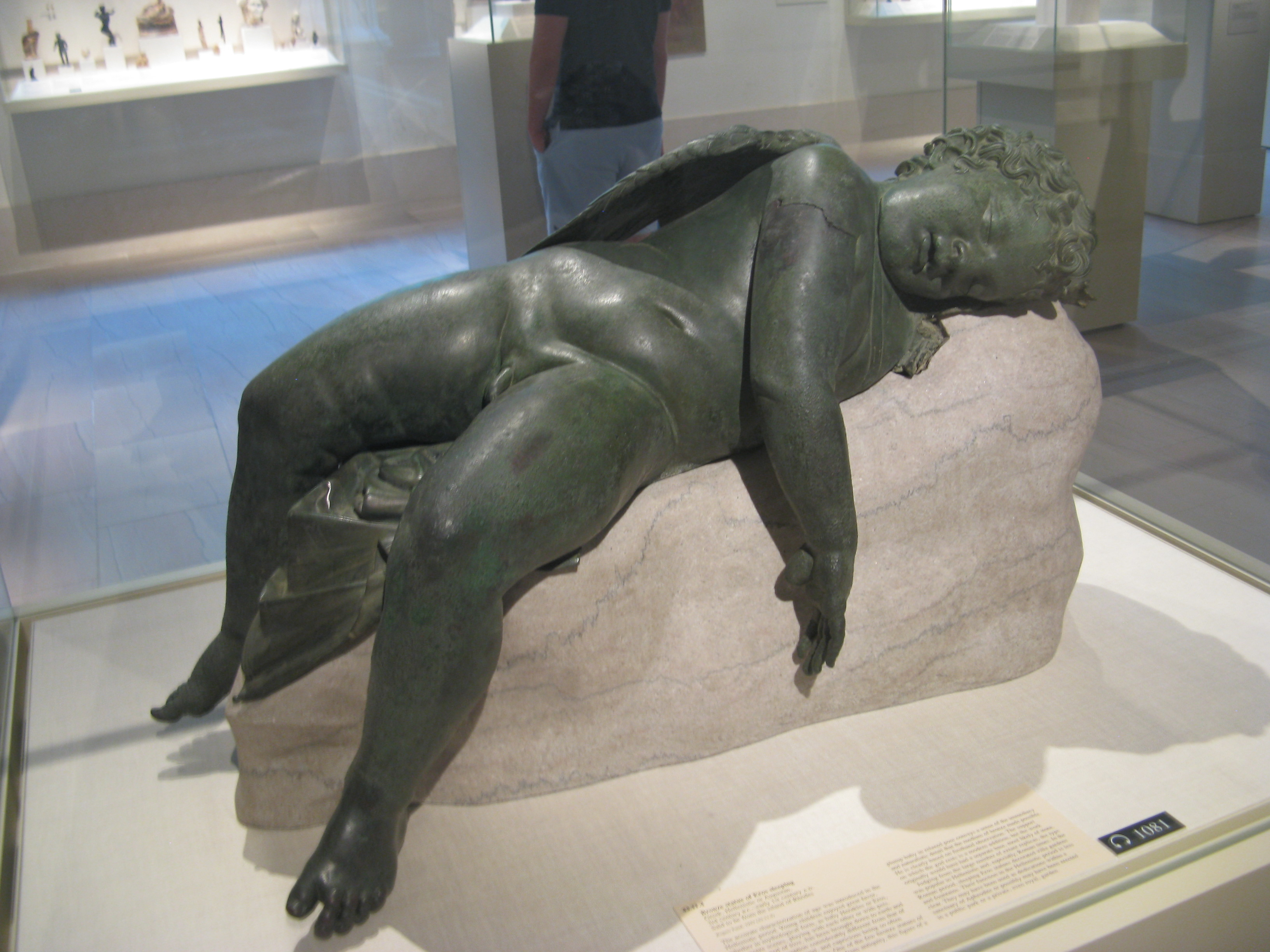
Hellenistic bronze of Sleeping Eros, the type of work that Verres extorted from Sicilian collectors

During Sulla's Civil War, Verres deserted the government faction of Gaius Marius and Carbo and went over to Sulla. Sulla made him a present of land at Beneventum and secured him against punishment for embezzlement. In 80 BC, Verres served on the staff of Gnaeus Cornelius Dolabella, governor of Cilicia. According to Cicero, the governor and his subordinate both ruthlessly plundered the province. In 78 BC Dolabella had to stand trial at Rome accused of extortion and was found guilty with the evidence of Verres, who had secured a pardon.

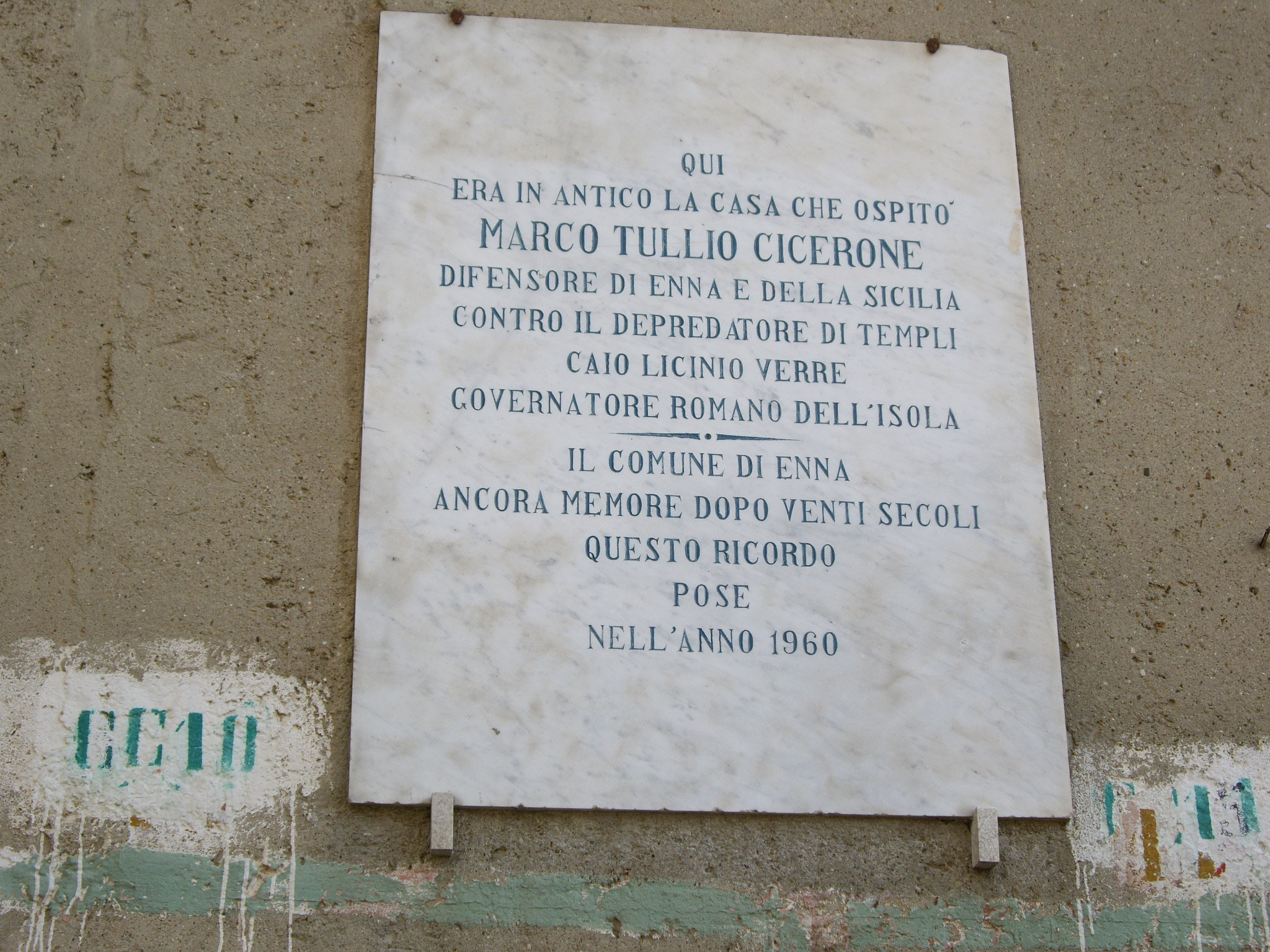
Commemorative plaque in Enna denouncing Verre's misdeeds

In 74 BC, by lavish use of bribes, Verres secured a praetorship. He abused his authority to further the political ends of his party. As a reward, the Senate sent him as governor (propraetor) to Sicily, the breadbasket of the Roman Republic – a particularly rich province thanks to its central position in the Mediterranean making it a commercial crossroads. The people were for the most part prosperous and contented, but under Verres the island experienced more misery and desolation than during the time of the First Punic War or the recent Servile Wars. Verres ruined the wheat-growers and the revenue collectors by exorbitant imposts or by the iniquitous canceling of contracts. He robbed temples (notably that on the site of the Cathedral of Syracuse) and private houses of their works of art, and disregarded the rights of Roman citizens.

Another major charge leveled against Verres during his Sicilian tenure alleged that, during the time of the Third Servile War against Spartacus, he had used the emergency to raise cash. He would, allegedly, pick key slaves of wealthy landowners and charge them with plotting to join Spartacus' revolt or otherwise causing sedition in the province. Having done so, he would sentence the slave to death by crucifixion, and then lay a broad hint that a sizable bribe from the slave's owner could expunge the charge and sentence. At other times he would name nonexistent slaves, charging that the landowner held a slave suspected of plotting rebellion and that the owner was actively hiding him. When the owner could not produce the fictitious person, Verres would throw the putative owner into prison until a bribe could be paid for his release.

He was also criticized for his public relationship with Tertia, which was regarded as scandalous, and Chelidon, who was attributed undue influence upon his office by his detractors.

Verres returned to Rome in 70 BC, and in the same year, at the request of the Sicilians, Marcus Tullius Cicero prosecuted him: Cicero later published the prosecution speeches as the Verrine Orations. Verres entrusted his defence to a very renowned orator, Quintus Hortensius, and he had the sympathy and support of several of the leading Roman patricians.

=== Trial and exile ===
The court was composed exclusively of senators, some of whom may have been his friends. However, the presiding judge, the city praetor, Manius Acilius Glabrio, was a thoroughly honest man, and his assessors were at least not accessible to bribery. Verres vainly tried to get the trial postponed until 69 BC when his friend Marcus Caecilius Metellus would be the presiding judge. Hortensius tried two successive tactics to delay the trial. The first was trying to sideline Verres' prosecution by hoping to get a prosecution of a former governor of Bithynia to take precedence. When that failed, the defense then looked to procedural delays (and gaming the usual format of a Roman extortion trial) until after a lengthy and upcoming round of public holidays, after which there would be scarce time for the trial to continue before Glabrio's term was up and the new and more malleable judge would be installed. However, on August 4, Cicero opened the case and vowed to short-circuit the plans by taking advantage of an opportunity to change the format of the trial to bring evidence and witnesses up much sooner, and opened his case with a short and blistering speech. He listed all of Verres crimes during his time as governor of Sicily and showed evidence that Verres had amassed 40 million sesterces in that time.

The effect of the first brief speech was so overwhelming that on August 13 Hortensius abandoned the defence as hopeless, and recommended his client leave the country. The following day, Verres was found guilty and fined three million sesterces. Before the expiration of the nine days allowed for the prosecution Verres was on his way to exile. There he lived until 43 BC, when he was proscribed by Mark Antony, apparently for refusing to surrender some art treasures that Antony coveted.

Verres may have had a more decent character than that with which Cicero, the primary source of information, credits him, but there is no evidence to counter the allegation that he stood preeminent among the worst specimens of Roman provincial governors. Of the seven Verrine orations collectively called In Verrem, only two were delivered; the remaining five were compiled from the depositions of witnesses and published after Verres' flight.

== Popular culture references ==
- Last Seen in Massilia, a novel in the Roma Sub Rosa series by Steven Saylor. Verres is a minor character.
- Imperium, the first novel of Robert Harris's trilogy about Cicero. The first half of the book features Cicero's prosecution of Verres.
- Spartacus: Swords and Ashes by Jonathan Clements. Verres is a major character in the novel, which is set on the eve of his governorship of Sicily and features an undocumented dispute with a young Cicero in Neapolis.
- Fortune's Favourites, a novel in the Masters of Rome series by Colleen McCullough. Verres, while a secondary character, describes his career in detail, from his pillaging of Samnium during the Social War, to his departure to Asia in the retinue of governor Gnaeus Cornelius Dolabella – where the author describes his vices and immeasurable greed, foreshadowing his misgovernment of Sicily – and, finally, Cicero's energetic prosecution.
- "Song for Cleomenes", a song by The Mountain Goats from their Beautiful Rat Sunset 10" EP, recounts the story of Verres.

== See also ==
- Quintus Caecilius Metellus Creticus § Role in Verres's trial
- Manius Acilius Glabrio (consul 67 BC)
- Heius, a Lilybaean, and a ward of Gaius Claudius Pulcher.

== Bibliography ==
- Badian, Ernst (2012). "Verres, Gaius". Oxford Classical Dictionary (4th ed.). doi:10.1093/acrefore/9780199381135.013.6743. ISBN 978-0-19-938113-5 – via Oxford Research Encyclopedias.
- Corvino, Ralph (2013). "Verres, Gaius". Encyclopedia of Ancient History. Wiley. doi:10.1002/9781444338386.wbeah20138. ISBN 978-1-4051-7935-5.
- Gruen, Erich (1995). The last generation of the Roman republic. Berkeley: University of California Press. ISBN 0-520-02238-6.
- Habermehl, Helmut (1958). "Verres 1". Realencyclopädie der classischen Altertumswissenschaft (in German). Vol. VIII A, 2. Stuttgart: Butcher. cols. 1561–1633.
- Pritchard, R T (1971). "Gaius Verres and the Sicilian Farmers". Historia: Zeitschrift für Alte Geschichte. 20 (2/3): 224–238. ISSN 0018-2311. JSTOR 4435193.
- Stone, Martin (2018). "Gaius Verres troubleshooter". In Blom, Henriette van der; Gray, Christa; Steel, Catherine (eds.). Institutions and Ideology in Republican Rome: Speech, Audience and Decision. Cambridge University Press. pp. 299ff. ISBN 978-1-108-62171-7.
- Tempest, Kathryn (2013). Gnomon. 85 (3): 269–272. ISSN 0017-1417. JSTOR 23502054.
- Tempest, Kathryn (2014) [First published 2011]. Cicero: politics and persuasion in ancient Rome. Bloomsbury Academic. ISBN 978-1-4725-3056-1.
