= Battle of Pharsalus =

Part of Caesar's Civil War (48 BC)

- Part of Caesar's invasion of Macedonia during Caesar's Civil War
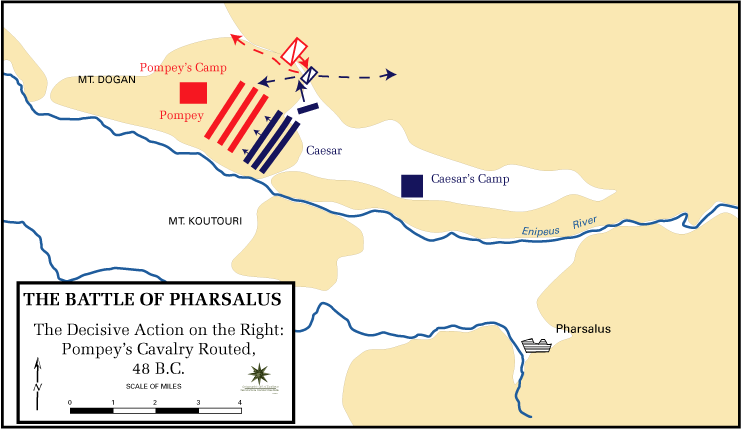
| Date | 9 August 48 BC |
| Location | Palaepharsalus, Greece 39°24′19″N 22°16′51″E |
| Result | Caesarian victory |
| Territorial changes | Most of the Eastern Roman provinces defect to Caesar |

Belligerents
| Caesarians | Pompeians |

Commanders and leaders
| Julius Caesar; Mark Antony; Domitius Calvinus; Publius Sulla | Pompey; Titus Labienus; Metellus Scipio; Ahenobarbus †; Lentulus |

Units involved
| Legio VI; Legio VII; Legio VIII; Legio IX; Legio X; Legio XI; Legio XII; Legio XIII | Syrian legions; Cilician legions; Legio I; Legio III |

Strength
| 23,000+ (Note: Caesar only mentions his legionaries and cavalry, he omits the number of auxiliary infantry fighting in his army): 22,000 legionaries; 1,000 cavalry; ??? light infantry | 41,000–54,000+: 36,000–47,000 legionaries; 5,000–7,000 cavalry; Thousands of light infantry |

Casualties and losses
| 200–1,200 killed | 30,000–39,000 (Note: According to Caesar, the Pompeians lost 60,000 soldiers): 6,000–15,000 killed; 24,000 captured |
- Location within Greece

The Battle of Pharsalus was the decisive battle of Caesar's Civil War fought on 9 August 48 BC near Pharsalus in Central Greece. Julius Caesar and his allies formed up opposite the army of the Roman Republic under the command of Pompey. Pompey had the backing of a majority of Roman senators and his army significantly outnumbered the veteran Caesarian legions.

Pressured by his officers, Pompey reluctantly engaged in battle and suffered an overwhelming defeat, ultimately fleeing the camp and his men, disguised as an ordinary citizen. Eventually making his way to Egypt, he was assassinated upon his arrival at the order of Ptolemy XIII.

== Prelude ==
Following the start of the Civil War, Caesar had captured Rome, forced Pompey and his allies to withdraw from Italy, and defeated Pompey's legates in Spain. In the campaign season for 48 BC, Caesar crossed the Adriatic and advanced on Dyrrachium. There, he besieged it, but was defeated.

Caesar then withdrew east into Thessaly, partly to relieve one of his legates from attack by Metellus Scipio's forces arriving from Syria. He besieged Gomphi after it resisted him. Pompey pursued, seeking to spare Italy from invasion by concluding the war on Greek soil, to prevent Caesar from defeating Metellus Scipio's forces arriving from Syria, and under pressure from his overconfident allies who accused him of prolonging the war to extend his command.

== Date ==
The decisive battle took place on 9 August 48 BC according to the Republican calendar.

== Location ==
The location of the battlefield was for a long time the subject of controversy among scholars. Caesar himself, in his Commentarii de Bello Civili, mentions few place-names; and although the battle is called after Pharsalos by modern authors, four ancient writers – the author of the Bellum Alexandrinum (48.1), Frontinus (Strategemata 2.3.22), Eutropius (20), and Orosius (6.15.27) – place it specifically at Palaepharsalus ("Old" Pharsalus). Strabo in his Geographica (Γεωγραφικά) mentions both old and new Pharsaloi, and notes that the Thetideion, the temple to Thetis south of Scotoussa, was near both. In 198 BC, in the Second Macedonian War, Philip V of Macedon sacked Palaepharsalos (Livy, Ab Urbe Condita 32.13.9), but left new Pharsalos untouched. These two details perhaps imply that the two cities were not close neighbours. Many scholars, therefore, unsure of the site of Palaepharsalos, followed Appian (2.75) and located the battle of 48 BC south of the Enipeus or close to Pharsalos (today's Pharsala). Among the scholars arguing for the south side are Béquignon (1928), Bruère (1951), and Gwatkin (1957).

An increasing number of scholars, however, have argued for a location on the north side of the river. These include Perrin (1885), Holmes (1908), Lucas (1921), Rambaud (1955), Pelling (1973), Morgan (1983), and Sheppard (2006). John D. Morgan in his definitive "Palae-pharsalus – the Battle and the Town", shows that Palaepharsalus cannot have been at Palaiokastro, as Béquignon thought (a site abandoned c. 500 BC), nor the hill of Fatih-Dzami within the walls of Pharsalus itself, as Kromayer (1903, 1931) and Gwatkin thought; and Morgan argues that it is probably also not the hill of Khtouri (Koutouri), some 7 miles north-west of Pharsalus on the south bank of the Enipeus, as Lucas and Holmes thought, although that remains a possibility. However, Morgan believes it is most likely to have been the hill just east of the village of Krini (Krini Larisas, formerly Driskoli) very close to the ancient highway from Larisa to Pharsalus. This site is some six miles (9.7 km) north of Pharsalus, and three miles north of the river Enipeus, and not only has remains dating back to Neolithic times but also signs of habitation in the 1st century BC and later. The identification seems to be confirmed by the location of a place misspelled "Palfari" or "Falaphari" shown on a medieval route map of the road just north of Pharsalus. Morgan places Pompey's camp a mile to the west of Krini, just north of the village of Avra (formerly Sarikayia), and Caesar's camp some four miles to the east-south-east of Pompey's. According to this reconstruction, therefore, the battle took place not between Pharsalus and the river, as Appian wrote, but between Old Pharsalus and the river.

An interesting side-note on Palaepharsalus is that it was sometimes identified in ancient sources with Phthia, the home of Achilles. Near Old and New Pharsalus was a "Thetideion", or temple dedicated to Thetis, the mother of Achilles. However, Phthia, the kingdom of Achilles and his father Peleus, is more usually identified with the lower valley of the Spercheios river, much further south.

== Name of the battle ==
Although it is often called the Battle of Pharsalus by modern historians, this name was rarely used in the ancient sources. Caesar merely calls it the proelium in Thessaliā ("battle in Thessalia"); Marcus Tullius Cicero and Hirtius call it the Pharsālicum proelium ("Pharsalic battle") or pugna Pharsālia ("Pharsalian battle"), and similar expressions are also used in other authors. But Hirtius (if he is the author of the de Bello Alexandrino) also refers to the battle as having taken place at Palaepharsalus, and this name also occurs in Strabo, Frontinus, Eutropius, and Orosius. Lucan in his poem about the Civil War regularly uses the name Pharsālia, and this term is also used by the epitomiser of Livy and by Tacitus. The only ancient sources to refer to the battle as being at Pharsalus are a certain calendar known as the Fasti Amiternini and the Greek authors Plutarch, Appian, and Polyaenus. It has therefore been argued by some scholars that "Pharsalia" would be a more accurate name for the battle than Pharsalus.

== Opposing armies ==
The total number of soldiers on each side is unknown because ancient accounts of the battle focused primarily on giving the numbers of Italian legionaries only, regarding allied non-citizen contingents as inferior and inconsequential. According to Caesar, his own army included 22,000 Roman legionaries distributed throughout 80 cohorts (8 legions), alongside 1,000 Gallic and Germanic cavalry. All of Caesar's legions were understrength; some only had about a thousand men at the time of Pharsalus, due partly to losses at Dyrrhachium and partly to Caesar's wish to rapidly advance with a picked body as opposed to a ponderous movement with a large army. Another source adds that he had recruited Greek light infantry from Dolopia, Acarnania, and Aetolia; these numbered no more than a few thousand. Caesar, Appian and Plutarch give Pompey an army of 45,000 Roman infantry. Osorius describes Pompey as having 88 cohorts of Roman infantry, which at full strength would come to 44,000 men, while Brunt and Wylie estimated Pompey's Roman infantry as being as 38,000 men, and Greenhalgh said they contained a maximum of 36,000. (Note: According to Caesar, Pompey had 45,000 Roman legionaries in 110 cohorts. Other ancient sources estimated 60,000–70,000 Italians fought in the battle, with the Pompeians outnumbering the Caesarians by anywhere from 50% to 100%. Caesar's figures are often rejected as exaggerations, partly because Pompey did not have had all of his 110 cohorts at the battle, and the correct number is probably 88. Greenhalgh, keeping to Caesar's own proportions, says Pompey had a maximum of 36,000 legionaries; Brunt and Wylie allow for approximately 38,000.)

It was in his auxiliary troops and in particular his cavalry, all of which vastly outnumbered Caesar's own, that Pompey had his greatest advantage. He had anywhere between 5,000 and 7,000 cavalry, and thousands of archers, slingers and light infantrymen at his disposal, composed of primarily Gallic and Germanic horsemen alongside all polyglot peoples of the east – namely Greeks, Thracians, and Anatolians from the Balkans and Syrians, Phoenicians, and Jews from the Levant. In addition, Pompey added horsemen conscripted from his own slaves to the force. Many of the foreigners served under their own rulers, who directed either in person or through proxies. Many of these rulers were Pompey's personal clients, including more than a dozen despots and petty kings under Roman influence in the east.

=== Caesarian legions ===
Caesar had the following legions with him:

- the VI legion (called Ferrata) veterans of his Gallic Wars
- the VII legion (later called Claudia Pia Fidelis) veterans of his Gallic Wars
- the VIII legion (later called Augusta) veterans of his Gallic Wars
- the IX legion (later called Hispana) veterans of his Gallic Wars
- the X legion (Equestris, later called Gemina) veterans of his Gallic Wars
- the XI legion (later called Paterna and Claudia Pia Fidelis, the same title as the seventh) veterans of his Gallic Wars
- the XII legion (later called Fulminata) veterans of his Gallic Wars
- the XIII legion (later also called Gemina, the 'twin' to the tenth) veterans of his Gallic Wars

The bulk of Caesar's army at Pharsalus was made up of his veterans from the Gallic Wars; very experienced, battle-hardened troops who were absolutely devoted to their commander.

== Deployment ==
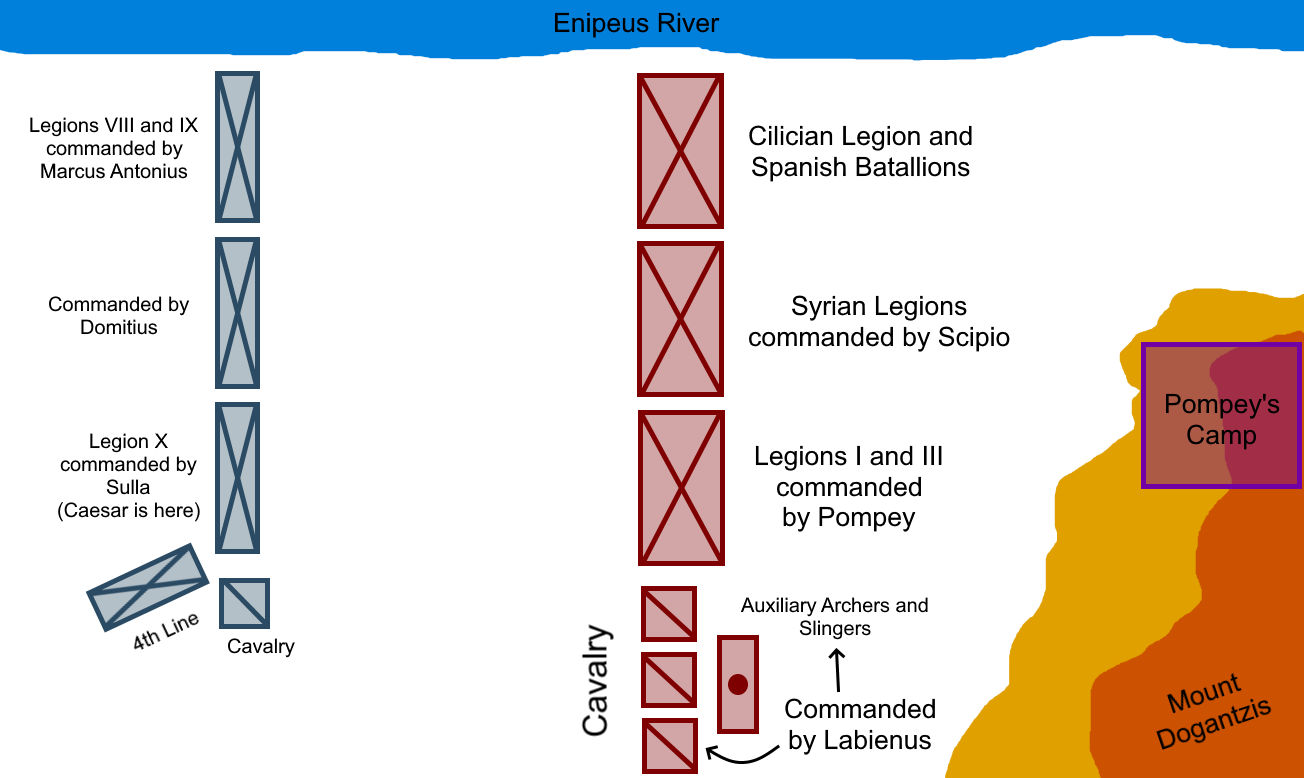
Initial deployment of forces at the Battle of Pharsalus, August 48 BC

The two generals deployed their legions in the traditional three lines (triplex acies), with Pompey's right and Caesar's left flanks resting on river Enipeus. As the stream provided enough protection to that side, Pompey moved almost all of his cavalry, archers, and slingers to the left, to make the most of their numerical strength. Only a small force of 500–600 Pontic cavalry and some Cappadocian light infantry was placed on his right flank. Pompey stationed his strongest legions in the center and wings of his infantry line, and dispersed some 2,000 re-enlisted veterans throughout the entire line in order to inspire the less experienced. The Pompeian cohorts were arrayed in an unusually thick formation, 10 men deep: their task was just to tie down the enemy foot while Pompey's cavalry, his key to victory, swept through Caesar's flank and rear. The column of legions was divided under command of three subordinates, with Lentulus in charge of the left, Scipio of the center and Ahenobarbus the right. (Note: The sources are confused on the position of Pompey's commanders. In the version of Caesar and Lucan (Pharsalia 7.217–223), Pompey, Lentulus, and the 1st and 3rd legions are said to be on the left wing, and Ahenobarbus on the right. Appian and Plutarch, on the other hand, place Pompey and Lentulus on the right and Ahenobarbus on the left. Morgan favors the testimony of Caesar and Lucan since the former was an eyewitness, and because Pompey is more likely to have placed himself where the decisive engagement was expected to occur, the left wing.) Labienus was entrusted with command of the cavalry charge, while Pompey himself took up a position behind the left wing in order to oversee the course of the battle.

Caesar also deployed his men in three lines, but, being outnumbered, had to thin his ranks to a depth of only six men, in order to match the frontage presented by Pompey. His left flank, resting on the Enipeus River, consisted of his battle-worn IX legion supplemented by the VIII legion, these were commanded by Mark Antony. The VI, XII, XI and XIII formed the centre and were commanded by Domitius, then came the VII and upon his right he placed his favored X legion, giving Sulla command of this flank – Caesar himself took his stand on the right, across from Pompey. Upon seeing the disposition of Pompey's army Caesar grew discomforted, and further thinned his third line in order to form a fourth line on his right: this to counter the onslaught of the enemy cavalry, which he knew his numerically inferior cavalry could not withstand. He gave this new line detailed instructions for the role they would play, hinting that upon them would rest the fortunes of the day, and gave strict orders to his third line not to charge until specifically ordered.

== Battle ==
There was significant distance between the two armies, according to Caesar. Pompey ordered his men not to charge, but to wait until Caesar's legions came into close quarters; Pompey's adviser Gaius Triarius believed that Caesar's infantry would be fatigued and fall into disorder if they were forced to cover twice the expected distance of a battle march. Also, stationary troops were expected to be able to defend better against pila throws. Seeing that Pompey's army was not advancing, Caesar's infantry under Mark Antony and Gnaeus Domitius Calvinus started the advance. As Caesar's men neared throwing distance, without orders, they stopped to rest and regroup before continuing the charge; Pompey's right and centre line held as the two armies collided.

As Pompey's infantry fought, Labienus ordered the Pompeian cavalry on his left flank to attack Caesar's cavalry; as expected they successfully pushed back Caesar's cavalry. Caesar then revealed his hidden fourth line of infantry and surprised Pompey's cavalry charge; Caesar's men were ordered to leap up and use their pila to thrust at Pompey's cavalry instead of throwing them. Pompey's cavalry panicked and suffered hundreds of casualties, as Caesar's cavalry came about and charged after them. After failing to reform, the rest of Pompey's cavalry retreated to the hills, leaving the left wing of his legions exposed to the hidden troops as Caesar's cavalry wheeled around their flank. Caesar then ordered in his third line, containing his most battle-hardened veterans, to attack. This broke Pompey's left wing troops, who fled the battlefield.

After routing Pompey's cavalry, Caesar threw in his last line of reserves – a move which at this point meant that the battle was more or less decided. Pompey lost the will to fight as he watched both cavalry and legions under his command break formation and flee from battle, and he retreated to his camp, leaving the rest of his troops at the centre and right flank to their own devices. He ordered the garrisoned auxiliaries to defend the camp as he gathered his family, loaded up gold, and threw off his general's cloak to make a quick escape. As the rest of Pompey's army were left confused, Caesar urged his men to end the day by routing the rest of Pompey's troops and capturing the Pompeian camp. They complied with his wishes; after finishing off the remains of Pompey's men, they furiously attacked the camp walls. The Thracians and the other auxiliaries who were left in the Pompeian camp, in total seven cohorts, defended bravely, but were not able to fend off the assault.

Caesar had won his greatest victory, claiming to have only lost about 200 soldiers and 30 centurions and assigning the Optimate losses to be 60,000 men. These numbers seem suspiciously exaggerated with Appian suggesting the Caesarean losses to be as many as 1,200 men and the Pompeian losses to be 6,000. In his history of the war, Caesar would praise his own men's discipline and experience, and remembered each of his centurions by name. He also questioned Pompey's decision not to charge.

== Aftermath ==
Pompey, despairing of the defeat, fled with his advisors overseas to Mytilene and thence to Cilicia where he held a council of war; at the same time, Cato and supporters at Dyrrachium attempted first to hand over command to Marcus Tullius Cicero, who refused, deciding instead to return to Italy. They then regrouped at Corcyra and went thence to Libya. Others, including Marcus Junius Brutus sought Caesar's pardon, travelling over marshlands to Larissa where he was then welcomed graciously by Caesar in his camp. Pompey's council of war decided to flee to Egypt, which had in the previous year supplied him with military aid.

In the aftermath of the battle, Caesar captured Pompey's camp and burned Pompey's correspondence. He then announced that he would forgive all who asked for mercy. Pompeian naval forces in the Adriatic and Italy mostly withdrew or surrendered.

Hearing of Pompey's flight to Egypt, Caesar remained in hot pursuit, first landing in Asia and reaching Alexandria on 2 October 48 BC, where he learned of Pompey's murder and then was embroiled in a dynastic dispute between Ptolemy XIII and Cleopatra.

== Importance ==
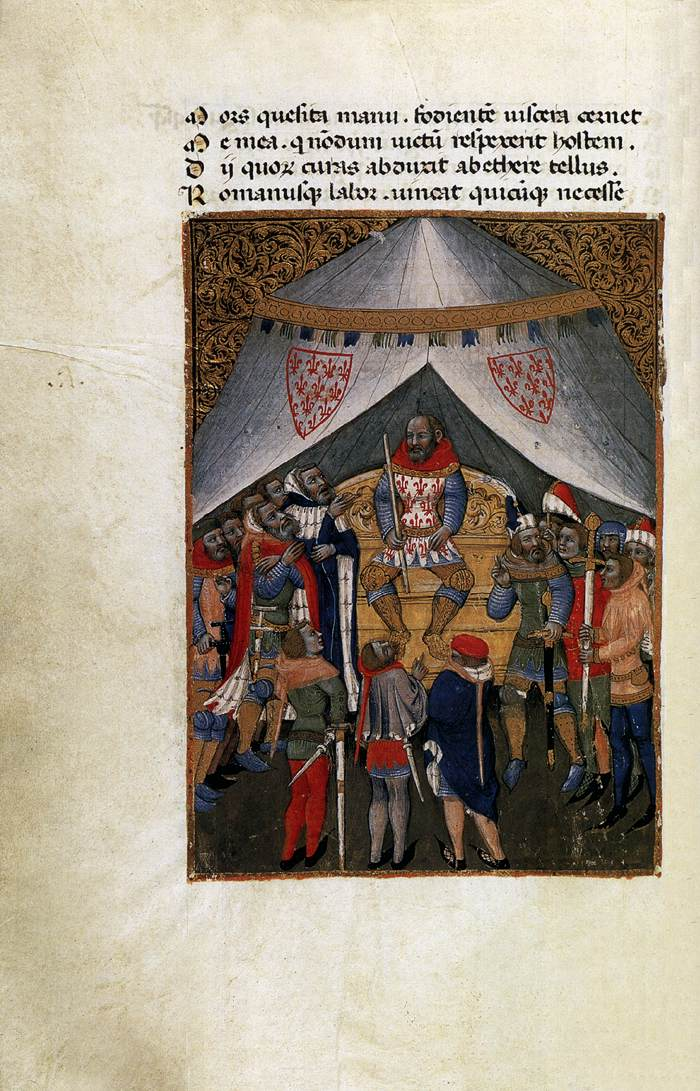
An anachronistic 14th-century miniature by Niccolò da Bologna showing Caesar, the victor over Pompey at the Battle of Pharsalus

Paul K. Davis wrote that "Caesar's victory took him to the pinnacle of power, effectively ending the Republic." The battle itself did not end the civil war but it was decisive and gave Caesar a much needed boost in legitimacy. Until then much of the Roman world outside Italy supported Pompey and his allies due to the extensive list of clients he held in all corners of the Republic. After Pompey's defeat former allies began to align themselves with Caesar as some came to believe the gods favored him, while for others it was simple self-preservation. The ancients took great stock in success as a sign of favoritism by the gods. This is especially true of success in the face of almost certain defeat – as Caesar experienced at Pharsalus. This allowed Caesar to parlay this single victory into a huge network of willing clients to better secure his hold over power and force the Optimates into near exile in search for allies to continue the fight against Caesar.

== In popular culture ==
The battle gives its name to the following artistic, geographical, and business concerns:

- Pharsalia, a poem by Lucan
- Pharsalia, New York, U.S.
- Pharsalia Technologies, Inc.

In Alexandre Dumas' The Three Musketeers, the author makes reference to Caesar's purported order that his men try to cut the faces of their opponents – their vanity supposedly being of more value to them than their lives.

In Mankiewicz's 1963 film Cleopatra, the immediate aftermath of Pharsalus is used as an opening scene to set the action in motion.
