= Lucius Volcatius Tullus (consul 33 BC) =

Lucius Volcatius Tullus was a Roman politician who was elected consul in 33 BC.

== Biography ==
Tullus was the son of Lucius Volcatius Tullus, the consul of 66 BC. Elected praetor urbanus in 46 BC, in 45 BC he was allotted the province of Cilicia for his propraetoral governorship, which he held until 44 BC. His decision not to give aid to Gaius Antistius Vetus, the governor of Syria, allowed Quintus Caecilius Bassus, the former governor and opponent of Julius Caesar, to hold out until the Parthians were able to reach Bassus.

Tullus subsequently was elected consul in 33 BC. He later was proconsul in Asia either from 28 to 27 BC, or from 27 to 26 BC.

== Sources ==
=== Primary sources ===
- Appian, Illyr. 27.
- Cassius Dio xlix. 43.
- Cicero ad Familiares xiii. 41.

=== Secondary sources ===
- Broughton, T. Robert S. (1952). The Magistrates of the Roman Republic, Vol II.

Political offices
Preceded by Paullus Aemilius Lepidus, and Marcus Herennius Picens as Suffect consuls	Consul of the Roman Republic; 33 BC with Octavian II, followed by Lucius Autronius Paetus	Succeeded by Lucius Flavius, and Gaius Fonteius Capito as Suffect consuls
