= Gaius Calpurnius Piso (consul 67 BC) =

Roman politician and general

Gaius Calpurnius Piso was a politician and general from the Roman Republic. He became praetor urbanus in 72/71 BC. After being elected consul in 67 BC, Piso opposed Pompeius' friends, the tribunes Gaius Cornelius and Aulus Gabinius. Assigned both Gallia Narbonensis and Gallia Cisalpina, he remained as proconsul until 65, or perhaps later in Cisalpina. Piso defeated an Allobrogian rebellion and repressed troubles in Transpadana, for which he was unsuccessfully prosecuted by Caesar. He supported Cicero during the Catiline conspiracy.

== Biography ==
In 72 or 71 BC, Piso became praetor urbanus after his acquittal on ambitus charges.

He was consul in 67 BC with Manius Acilius Glabrio. He belonged to the optimates, and, as consul, led the opposition to the proposed law of the tribune Aulus Gabinius, by which Pompey was to be entrusted with extraordinary powers for the purpose of conducting the war against the pirates. The law, however, was carried, notwithstanding all the opposition of Piso and his party. Shortly afterwards, when the orders that Pompeius had issued were not carried into execution in Gallia Narbonensis, in consequence, as it was supposed, of the intrigues of Piso, Gabinius proposed to deprive the latter of his consulship, an extreme measure which Pompey's prudence would not allow to be brought forward.

Piso did not have an easy life during his consulship. In the same year the tribune, Gaius Cornelius, proposed several laws, which were directed against the shameless abuses of the aristocracy. All these Piso resisted with the utmost vehemence, and none more strongly than a stringent enactment to put down bribery at elections. But as the senate could not with any decency refuse to lend their aid in suppressing this corrupt practice, they pretended that the law of Cornelius was so severe that no accusers would come forward, and no judges would condemn a criminal. They therefore made the consuls bring forward a less stringent law (Lex Atilia Calpurnia), imposing a fine on the offender, with exclusion from the senate and all public offices. It was with no desire to diminish corruption at elections that Piso joined his colleague in proposing the law, for an accusation had been brought against him in the preceding year of obtaining by bribery his own election to the consulship.

In 66 and 65 BC, Piso administered the province of Gallia Narbonensis as proconsul, and while there, he suppressed an insurrection of the Allobroges and repressed troubles in Transpadana. Like the other Roman nobles, he plundered his province, and was defended by Cicero in 63 BC when accused of robbing the Allobroges, and of executing unjustly a Cisalpine Gaul. The latter charge was brought against him at the instigation of Caesar, who had an interest in the area. Piso, in revenge, implored Cicero, without success, to accuse Caesar as one of the conspirators of Lucius Sergius Catilina.

In 61 BC, Piso was called on to speak first in the senate by Marcus Pupius Piso, one of his kinsmen, much to Cicero's chagrin.

Piso must have died before the outbreak of the civil war, but in what year is uncertain. He is not heard of after 59 BC. Cicero ascribes to him considerable oratorical abilities.

== See also ==
- List of Roman consuls

Political offices
Preceded by Lucius Caecilius Metellus; Quintus Marcius Rex	Roman consul 67 BC with Manius Acilius Glabrio	Succeeded by Manius Aemilius Lepidus; Lucius Volcacius Tullus
