= Manius Aemilius Lepidus (consul 66 BC) =

1st-century BC Roman consul

Manius Aemilius Lepidus was a Roman politician who became consul in 66 BC alongside Lucius Volcatius Tullus.

== Biography ==
A member of the patrician Aemilia clan, Lepidus was proquaestor in an eastern province between 84 BC and 78, and was the father of Quintus Aemilius Lepidus. By 69 he was elected to the post of praetor and in 66 he was elected consul together with Lucius Volcatius Tullus.

Lepidus is mentioned several times by Cicero, but never attained much political importance. In 65, he is spoken of as one of the witnesses against Gaius Cornelius, whom Cicero defended. In 63, Catiline offered to place himself in Lepidus's custody after Catiline was notified of an impending prosecution.

Lepidus belonged to the aristocratic party, but on the breaking out of the civil war in 49, he retired to his Formian villa to watch the progress of events. Here he was in almost daily intercourse with Cicero, from whose letters we learn that Lepidus was resolved not to cross the sea with Gnaeus Pompeius, but to yield to Julius Caesar if the latter was likely to be victorious. He eventually returned to Rome in March.

== Sources ==
- Sallust, Bellum Catilinae, 18
- Cicero, In Catilinam, 1.6; Pro Sulla, 4; Ad Atticum, 7.12, 7.23, 8.1, 8.6, 8.9, 8.15, 9.1
- Dio Cassius, Roman History, 36.42
- Asconius, in Cornel. p. 66, ed. Orelli

Political offices
Preceded by Manius Acilius Glabrio and Gaius Calpurnius Piso	Consul of the Roman Republic with Lucius Volcatius Tullus; 66 BCE	Succeeded by Lucius Manlius Torquatus and Lucius Aurelius Cotta
