= Quintus Hortensius =

Roman lawyer, orator and statesman (114–50 BC)

Quintus Hortensius Hortalus (114–50 BC) was a Roman lawyer, orator, and statesman. Politically he belonged to the Optimates. He was consul in 69 BC alongside Quintus Caecilius Metellus Creticus. His nickname was Dionysia, after a famous actress. After his retirement Hortensius took up fish-breeding as a hobby. Cicero spoke of him as a Piscinarius – 'fish fancier'.

== Biography ==
At the age of nineteen he made his first speech at the bar and shortly afterwards successfully defended either Nicomedes III or IV of Bithynia, one of Rome's dependants in the East, who had been deprived of his throne by his brother. From that time his reputation as an advocate was established. Through his marriage to Lutatia, daughter of Quintus Lutatius Catulus and Servilia, he was attached to the aristocratic party, the Optimates. During and after Lucius Cornelius Sulla's dictatorship, the courts of law were under the control of the Senate, the judges themselves being senators.

To this circumstance perhaps, as well as to his own merits, Hortensius may have been indebted for much of his success. Many of his clients were the governors of provinces which they were accused of having plundered. Such men were sure to find themselves brought before a friendly, not to say a corrupt, tribunal, and Hortensius, according to Cicero was not ashamed to avail himself of this advantage. Having served during two campaigns (in 90 and 89 BC) in the Social War, he served as quaestor in 81, aedile in 75, praetor in 72, and consul in 69. In the year before his consulship he came into collision with Cicero in the case of Gaius Verres, and from that time his supremacy at the bar was lost.

After 63, Cicero gravitated towards the faction to which Hortensius belonged. Consequently, in political cases, the two men were often engaged on the same side (e.g., in defence of Gaius Rabirius, Lucius Licinius Murena, Publius Cornelius Sulla, and Titus Annius Milo). After Pompey's return from the East in 61, Hortensius withdrew from public life and devoted himself to his profession. He may have assisted Cicero in the defence of Gnaeus Plancius against a charge of electoral malpractice (ambitus) in 54 BCE: Cicero mentions him in his speech, the Pro Plancio, but Hortensius's relationship to the case is uncertain.

He owned the Villa della Palombara near Rome and another in Gaeta.

In 56, Hortensius admired Cato the Younger "so much that he wanted them to be kinsmen, not merely friends," and proposed to marry Cato's daughter, Porcia Catonis, who was only about 20 years old at the time. Since Porcia was already married to Marcus Calpurnius Bibulus and had borne him children, Cato refused to dissolve the marriage. Instead, Cato offered his own wife, Marcia, on the condition that Marcia's father, Lucius Marcius Philippus, approve as well. Consent was obtained and Cato divorced Marcia, thereby placing her under her father's charge. Hortensius promptly married Marcia, who bore him a child. After Hortensius' death in 50 BC, she inherited "every last sesterce of his estate". This caused a minor scandal, as after Hortensius' death she remarried Cato, making both of them rich.

In 50, the year of his death, he successfully defended Appius Claudius Pulcher when accused of treason and corrupt practices by Publius Cornelius Dolabella, afterwards Cicero's son-in-law.

== Family ==
His daughter Hortensia became a successful orator. In 42, she spoke against the imposition of a special tax on wealthy Roman matrons with such success that part of it was remitted. His son Quintus Hortensius Hortalus, a friend of the poet Catullus, was granted the governorship of Macedonia in 44 by Julius Caesar, before switching allegiance to Brutus and perishing after the debacle of the Battle of Philippi in 42 BC. He likely also had a child with Marcia, possibly a daughter or son who became the mother or father of Marcius Hortalus.

== Oratory ==
Although none of Hortensius' speeches is extant, his oratory, according to Cicero, was of the Asiatic style, a florid rhetoric, better to hear than to read. Even though his gestures were highly artificial, and his manner of folding his toga was noted by tragic actors of the day, he was such a "gifted performer that even professional actors would stop rehearsal and come to watch him hold an audience captive with each swish of his toga." In addition to his style, he had a tenacious memory, and could retain every point in his opponent's argument. He also possessed a fine musical voice, which he could skillfully command.

He wrote a treatise on general questions of oratory, erotic poems, and an Annales, which gained him considerable reputation as a historian.

== Legacy ==
Hortensius' oratory gave him such vast wealth that he was able to spend his money gratuitously on splendid villas, parks, fish-ponds, costly entertainments, wine, pictures, and other works of art. He was also reputed to be the first to introduce peacocks as a table delicacy at Rome.

Cicero eventually wrote a dialogue, now lost, called Hortensius or "On Philosophy". The work defended the notion that genuine human happiness is to be found by using and embracing philosophy. St. Augustine wrote in his Confessions that this work left an impression upon him and moved him to embrace philosophy, and ultimately convert to Christianity.

Another of Cicero's works, his history of Latin oratory known as the Brutus, is dedicated to the memory of Hortensius. Though he criticises him at various points, Cicero's respect for Hortensius is evident throughout, and he frequently mourns his rival's death: 'I grieved to have lost in him not, as some may have thought, a rival jealous of my forensic reputation, but rather a friend, and a fellow worker in the same field of glorious endeavour ... each of us was helped by the other with exchange of suggestions, admonitions, and friendly offices'.

Over the centuries, Hortensius's orations were lost, and the last person reported in the literature to have read and commented upon one of Hortensius's original works was the first century AD rhetorician Quintilian. Today, not a single speech by Hortensius is extant.

Political offices
Preceded by Pompey; M. Licinius Crassus	Roman consul 69 BC with Q. Caecilius Metellus Creticus	Succeeded by Lucius Caecilius Metellus; Quintus Marcius Rex
