= Gaius Volusenus =

Late Roman Republic-era military officer

Gaius Volusenus Quadratus (fl. mid-1st century BC) was a distinguished military officer of the Roman Republic. He served under Julius Caesar for ten years, during the Gallic Wars and the civil war of the 40s. Caesar praised him for his strategic sense and courageous integrity.

== Italian origin ==
The name Volusenus may be Etruscan in origin (as Volasenna), but some scholars have attributed an Umbrian origin to the family, based on inscriptional evidence.

== Military service ==
During the Gallic War Volusenus served as tribunus militum in the 12th Legion under the legatus legionis Servius Galba, and distinguished himself in battle when Galba was defeated by the Nantuates in 57 BC.

In 55 BC Volusenus was sent out by Caesar in a single warship to undertake a week-long survey of the coast of south eastern Britain prior to Caesar's invasion. He probably examined the Kent coast between Hythe and Sandwich. However, when Caesar arrived at Dover with his forces he saw that landing would be impossible. Instead, he travelled north and landed on an open beach, probably near Walmer. Volusenus had evidently failed to find a suitable harbour, which would have prevented the damage Caesar's exposed ships would suffer at high tide. The great natural harbour at Richborough, a little further north, was used by Claudius in his invasion just 100 years later, but we do not know whether Volusenus travelled that far, or indeed whether it existed in a suitable form at that time (our knowledge of the geomorphology of the Wantsum Channel that created that haven is limited).

Volusenus later became Praefectus Equitum (cavalry commander). In 53 BC, during the revolt of Ambiorix, he was sent ahead by Caesar with cavalry to relieve Quintus Cicero, who was besieged by the Sugambri in Atuatuca, but found it difficult to convince the terrified defenders that the rest of Caesar's army was not far behind.

When the legate Titus Labienus suspected Commius, the formerly loyal king of the Atrebates, of conspiring against them in the winter of 54 or 53 BC, he invited him to a meeting and sent Volusenus and some centurions to execute him for his treachery. Commius escaped, but sustained a wound to the head.

In 51 BC Volusenus was serving as commander of cavalry under Mark Antony, and in the winter of that year was ordered by Antony to pursue Commius, who was conducting a campaign of agitation and guerrilla warfare. He defeated him in several skirmishes, and finally destroyed Commius's forces in a single engagement, although at the cost of a spear-wound to the thigh. S.P. Oakley sees this encounter as an unusual example of single combat in the Late Republic, echoing duels between Romans and physically superior Celts in the Early Republic. Commius himself escaped and later sued for peace on the condition that he never again had to meet a Roman.

In 48 BC, during the Civil War, an attempt to assassinate Volusenus was made by Aegus and Roscillus, two noble brothers of the Celtic Allobroges who had served in Caesar's cavalry throughout the Gallic Wars. The brothers had been caught defrauding their comrades of pay and decided to defect to Pompey's side. The death of Volusenus was meant to render Pompey useful service, but the task proved too difficult, and they were forced to defect without any such token.

Ronald Syme noted that Volusenus's decade-long tour of duty might have been uncommon for a man of his equestrian social rank, many of whom "owed their commissions less to merit than to the claims of friendship and influence or the hope of procuring gain and political advancement." The exemplary career of Volusenus, like that of Decidius Saxa, indicates that even in the Late Republic an equestrian might choose to excel as a career officer rather than as a publican or businessman. Volusenus is one of only three ranking officers to whom Caesar ascribes the quality of virtus.

== Political career? ==
Based on a "hopelessly corrupt" reading of one of Cicero's speeches against Mark Antony, Volusenus was sometimes identified by 19th-century scholars as a tribune of the plebs in 43 BC. The passage, and Volusenus's documented loyalty to Caesar, was thus interpreted to mean that he was a supporter of Mark Antony, but two other manuscripts indicate that the proper noun is in fact a verb (voluissent) and neither Cicero nor any other source mentions Volusenus among Antony's followers. T.R.S. Broughton does not record a plebeian tribunate for Volusenus in The Magistrates of the Roman Republic, confirming only that Volusenus was a military tribune in 56 and held the rank of praefectus equitum in 52–51 and again in 48.
