= Lex Acilia Calpurnia =

Roman electoral law

Lex Acilia Calpurnia was a law established during the Roman Republic in 67 BC mandating permanent exclusion from office in cases of electoral corruption. The law was passed by and named for the year's consuls Manius Acilius Glabrio and Gaius Calpurnius Piso.

== Background ==
Cassius Dio wrote that the law was directed at men convicted of bribery while seeking office and provided that they "should neither hold office nor be a senator, and should incur a fine besides." He connected this measure to the repeal of a ban on the plebeian tribunes being enrolled as senators or running for public offices after their tribunate. This led to many people 'aspiring to regain the rank of senator by one means or another [and] a great many factions and cliques were being formed aiming at all the offices.' According to Cassius Dio, the two consuls did not dislike the practice of bribery while canvassing.

Calpurnius Piso had been indicted on this charge but escaped prosecution, again, through bribery. They were forced to propose the law by the Senate. Gaius Cornelius, while he was a plebeian tribune, proposed severe penalties for bribery and this was passed by the people. The Senate realized that it was difficult to find men who would lodge accusations or who would or issue verdicts for bribery because of the severity of the penalties. It sought to moderate the penalties so as to "encourage many to accusations and not prevent condemnations." It got the consuls to frame this as a law. However, the elections had already been announced and no law could be enacted until they were held. The canvassers got up to mischief and there were even murders. The Senate decided to introduce the law before the elections and to give the consuls a lictor. Gaius Cornelius got angry and proposed to the assembly of the people that the senators should not be allowed to grant office to those who sought it in a way not prescribed by law, "or to usurp the people's right of decision in any other matter." The senators and Calpurnius Piso opposed this. There was a popular commotion. The lictor's fasces were broken and Piso was threatened. To avoid violence Cornelius dismissed the assembly without calling for a vote. He then added a provision to the law that the Senate should issue a preliminary decree on these matters and that the decree had to be ratified by the people. After this the law was passed.

== See also ==
- Roman Law
- List of Roman laws
- Gens Acilia and Calpurnia
