= Philopator =

Philopator (Greek: Φιλοπάτωρ), meaning "father-loving", was a common royal epithet among Hellenistic monarchs:

- Ptolemy IV Philopator, King of Egypt
- Ptolemy VII Neos Philopator, King of Egypt
- Ptolemy XIII Theos Philopator, King of Egypt
- Cleopatra VII Philopator, Queen of Egypt
- Ptolemy XV Philopator Philometor Caesar, son of Cleopatra VII and Julius Caesar
- Arsinoe III Philopator, Queen of Egypt
- Seleucus IV Philopator, Seleucid king
- Antiochus X Eusebes Philopator, Seleucid king
- Ariarathes V Eusebes Philopator, King of Cappadocia
- Ariarathes VI Epiphanes Philopator, King of Cappadocia
- Ariarathes IX Eusebes Philopator, King of Cappadocia
- Ariobarzanes II Philopator, King of Cappadocia
- Mithridates IV Philopator Philadelphos, King of Pontus
- Strato III Soter Philopator, Indo-Greek king

It can also refer to:

- Philopator I, Roman client king of Cilicia
- Philopator II, Roman client king of Cilicia
- Philopator (moth), a genus of moths in the family Zygaenidae

== See also ==
- Eupator (disambiguation)
- Philometor (disambiguation)
- Philadelphos (disambiguation)
