= Cilicia (Roman province) =

Roman province located in modern-day Turkey

Provincia Cilicia Ἐπαρχία Κιλικίας
- Province of the Roman Republic and the Roman Empire
- 64 BC–8th century
- Roman Cilicia, c. 125 AD
- Capital: Tarsus (modern-day Mersin, Turkey)
- History
  - Conquest by Pompey: 64 BC
  - Muslim conquest: 8th century
Preceded by
Cilicia
Succeeded by
Thughur
Cibyrrhaeot Theme
Theme of Seleucia
- Today part of: Turkey

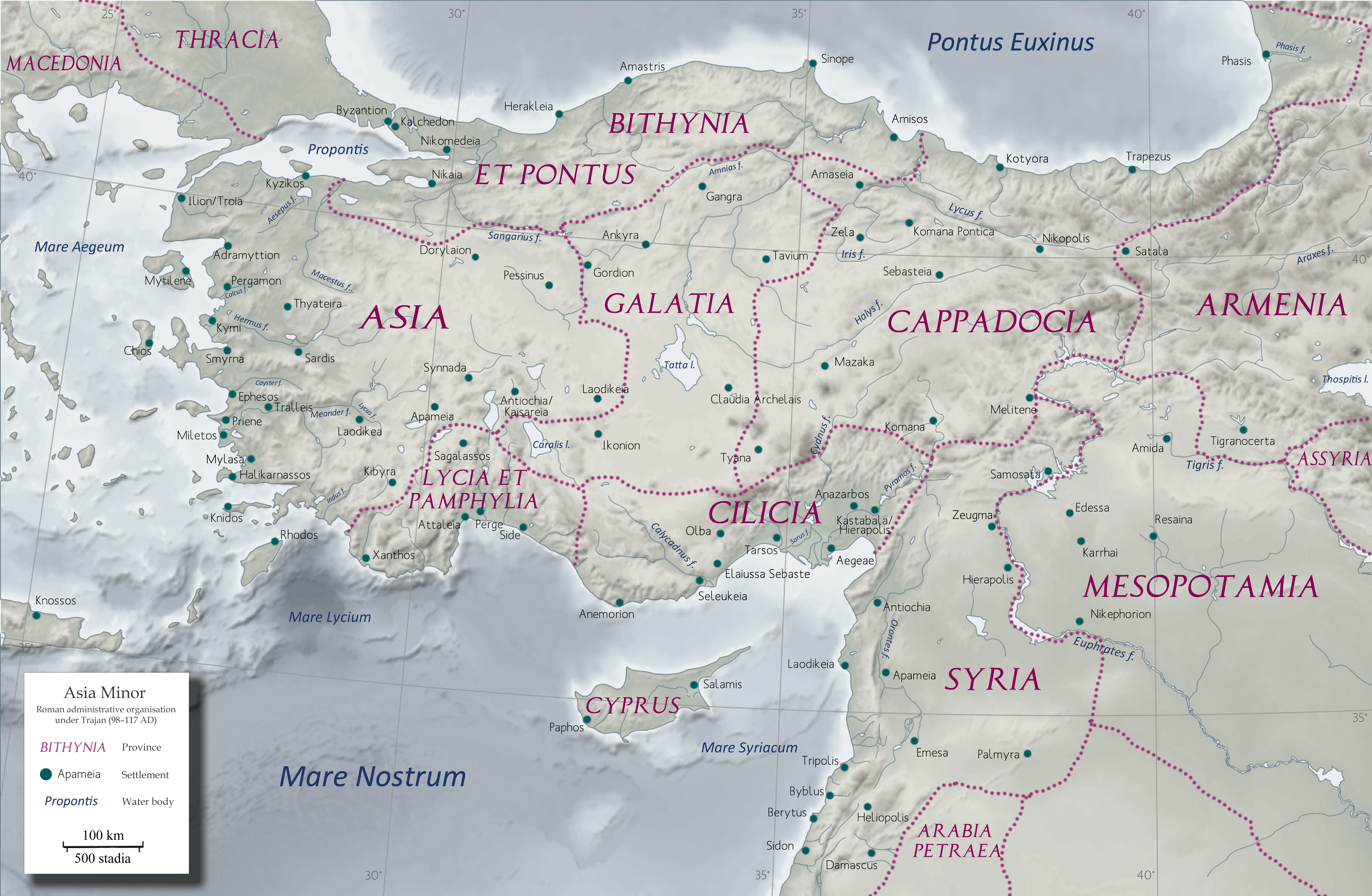
The Roman provinces of Asia Minor under Trajan, including Cilicia.

Cilicia (/sɪˈlɪʃiə/) was an early Roman province, located on what is today the southern (Mediterranean) coast of Turkey. Cilicia was annexed to the Roman Republic in 64 BC by Pompey, as a consequence of his victory over the Cilician pirates and in the Third Mithridatic War. It was subdivided by Diocletian in around 297, and it remained under Roman rule for several centuries, until falling to the Islamic conquests.

== First contact and establishment of the province (103–47 BC) ==
The area was a haven for pirates that profited from the slave trade with the Romans. When the Cilician pirates began to attack Roman shipping and towns, the Roman senate decided to send various commanders to deal with the threat. It was during the course of these interventions that the province of Cilicia came into being.

Parts of Cilicia Pedias became Roman territory in 103 BC, during Marcus Antonius’s first campaign against the pirates. While the entire area of Cilicia was his "province" (or more correctly, his area of imperium) during his propraetorial command, only a small portion of that region was made a Roman province at that time.

In 96 BC, Lucius Cornelius Sulla was appointed the propraetorial governor of Cilicia, during which time he stopped an invasion by Mithridates II of Parthia. In 80 BC, the governor of Cilicia was Gnaeus Cornelius Dolabella, who was later convicted of illegally plundering the province. His replacement in 78 BC was Publius Servilius Vatia Isauricus. He was given the responsibility of clearing out the pirates, and his posting lasted until 74 BC. From 77 to 76 BC, he achieved a number of naval victories against the pirates off the Cilician coast, and was able to occupy the Lycian and Pamphylian coasts. After the pirates fled to their fortified strongholds, Vatia Isauricus began attacking their coastal fortresses. He captured the town of Olympos before going on to capture Phaselis and subduing Corycus and a number of minor pirate strongholds.

Then in 75 BC Vatia Isauricus advanced across a Roman army across the Taurus Mountains for the first time, and succeeded in defeating the Isauri along the northern slopes. He laid siege to their principal town, Isaura, and managed to capture it after diverting the course of a river, thereby depriving the defenders in the town from their only source of water, after which they soon surrendered. By 74 BC, Vatia Isauricus had organized the territory he had conquered and incorporated it into the province of Cilicia. Nevertheless, much of Cilicia Pedias was still held by Tigranes the Great and belonged to the kingdom of Armenia, while Cilicia Trachea was still under the domination of the pirates.

Vatia Isauricus was succeeded as proconsul of Cilicia by Lucius Licinius Lucullus who used Isauricus' veterans and fleet to fight in the war against Mithridates VI of Pontus (see: Third Mithridatic War). Since Tigranes was Mithridates' ally Lucullus eventually moved against his possessions in Cilicia Pedias and added them to the Roman province of Cilicia.

It was not until Pompey was granted his extraordinary command against the pirates in 67 BC, and the decisive Battle of Korakesion (in modern Alanya), that the pirates were finally driven out and subdued, and Cilicia Trachea was brought under Roman control. After Pompey was granted command of the Third Mithridatic War, he forced the surrender of King Triganes and proceeded to strip off of the king the parts of Cilicia Pedias that Triganes still possessed. By 64 BC, as part of his general settlement of the East, Pompey had organized the new province, adding all of his recent conquests to the original province of Cilicia, and made Tarsus the capital of the new province.

Pompey's reorganized Cilicia had six parts: Cilicia Campestris, Cilicia Aspera, Pamphylia, Pisidia, Isauria, and Lycaonia; with the largest part of Phrygia, including the Conventus iuridicus of Laodicea, Apamea, and Synnada. To the east of Cilicia Campestris, Pompey left a local dynast, Tarcondimotus I, in control of Anazarbos and Mount Amanus. The Tarcondimotid dynasty would continue to hold the region as loyal allies of Rome until the reign of Tiberius.

In 58 BC, the island of Cyprus was added, which the Romans had taken from the king of Egypt. This was the extent of the Roman province of Cilicia when Cicero was proconsul of Cilicia in 51–50 BC. The Romans had by now divided it into eight Conventus (or Fora): the Conventus of Tarsus, where the governor resided; the Forum of Iconium for Lycaonia; the Forum Isauricum, possibly at Philornelium; the Forum Pamphylium, the place of which is unknown; the Forum Cibyraticum, at Laodicea on the Lycus; the Forum of Apamea; the Forum of Synnada; and Cyprus.

== Provincial changes (47 BC – 14 AD) ==
The Roman Empire under Hadrian (ruled 117-38), showing the senatorial province of Cilicia in southern Anatolia

The province was reorganized by Julius Caesar in 47 BC. The Forum (or Conventus) of Cibyra was attached to the province of Asia, together with the greater part of Pisidia, Pamphylia, as well as possibly the Conventus of Apamea and Synnada. Further changes were made by Marcus Antonius in 36 BC, when he gave Cyprus and Cilicia Aspera to Cleopatra VII, and eastern Phrygia with Lycaonia, Isauria, and Pisidia, to king Amyntas of Galatia.

In 27 BC, the Roman emperor Augustus made further changes, reducing the province of Cilicia still further. Cyprus was made a separate province; and Pamphylia with Isauria and Pisidia, after the death of Amyntas in 25 BC, was also made a separate province (the province of Galatia), to which Lycaonia was also attached. The result was that Cilicia was reduced to the original parts Campestris and Aspera, and renamed Syria-Cilicia Phoenice. Under Augustus, Cilicia was an imperial province, administered by a consular Legatus Augusti pro praetore.

As per the late Republican and early imperial methods of provincial rule, the western mountainous parts of Cilicia, which were not easy for a governor to manage, were left to the native princes. There were a total of three of these independent native dynasties. One was that of Olba, in the mountains between Soli and Cyinda, ruled by priest-dynasts. A second was Cilicia Aspera, which Marc Antony had originally given to Cleopatra. Augustus placed this territory under the rule of king Archelaus of Cappadocia in 25 BC. The son of Tarcondimotos in eastern Cilicia had lost his throne in 30 BC because of his father's unwavering support of Mark Antony, but the kingdom was restored in 20 BC; it was to last another 37 years before Tiberius finally abolished this client kingdom and changed it to a full province.

== Under the Principate (14–297 AD) ==
In 72 AD, during the reign of Vespasian, all three remaining client kingdoms established by Augustus were disestablished, and merged with the imperial province of Cilicia. By the reign of Caracalla, the proconsular governor was named as a Consularis, and it contained 47 known cities.

== Under the late empire (297 – c. 700 AD) ==
Sometime during the rule of the Diocletian and the Tetrarchy (probably around 297 AD), Cilicia was divided into three parts: Cilicia Prima, under a consularis, with its capital at Tarsus; Cilicia Secunda, under a praeses, with its capital at Anazarbus; and Isauria (originally Cilicia Aspera), under a praeses, with its capital at Seleucia. These 3 Cilician provinces, plus the Syrian, Mesopotamian, Egyptian and Libyan provinces, formed the Diocese of the East (in the late 4th century the African component was split off as Diocese of Egypt), part of the praetorian prefecture of the East, the rich bulk of the eastern Roman Empire.

Cilicia proper remained under East Roman (Byzantine) control until the early 8th century, when it was conquered by the Umayyad Caliphate and became part of the Islamic borderlands (thughur) with the Romans. The region had, however, been almost completely depopulated already since the middle of the 7th century and formed a no man's land between the Romans and the Caliphate. The western parts of the old province of Cilicia remained in Roman hands and became part of the Cibyrrhaeot Theme. The status quo would remain unchanged for over 260 years before Cilicia was eventually reconquered for the Romans in the 950s and 960s by Nikephoros Phokas and John Tzimiskes.

== See also ==
- List of Roman governors of Cilicia
- Pompey's campaign against pirates

== Sources ==
- Pilhofer, Philipp. 2018. Das frühe Christentum im kilikisch-isaurischen Bergland. Die Christen der Kalykadnos-Region in den ersten fünf Jahrhunderten (Texte und Untersuchungen zur Geschichte der altchristlichen Literatur, vol. 184). Berlin/Boston: De Gruyter (ISBN 978-3-11-057381-7), p. 25–49.
- Broughton, T. Robert S., The Magistrates of the Roman Republic, Vol. I (1951)
- Smith, William, Dictionary of Greek and Roman Biography and Mythology, Vol III (1867)
- Smith, William, Dictionary of Greek and Roman Geography (1854)
