= Tarcondimotus I =

Roman client king of Upper Cilicia

Tarcondimotus I Philantonios
- Basileus
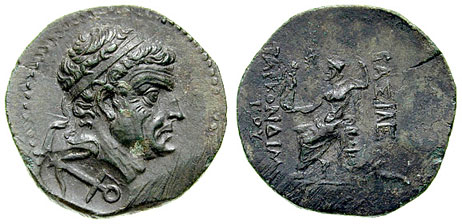

Toparch of Upper Cilicia
- Reign: c. 70–38 BC

King of Upper Cilicia
- Reign: c. 38-31 BC
- Successor: Philopator I
- Born: c. 100 BC
- Died: 31 BC; Battle of Actium
- Issue: Laius; Philopator I Julia; Tarcondimotus II
- Dynasty: Tarcondimotid dynasty
- Father: Strato

Tarcondimotus I Philantonios ((Greek: Ταρκονδίμοτος; died 31 BC) was a Roman client ruler of Upper Cilicia. He rose to power during the collapse of the Seleucid kingdom and was confirmed as toparch by Pompey in or after 66 BC. Within fifteen years he was described by Cicero as Rome's most loyal ally east of the Taurus Mountains. He was formally recognized as king by Mark Antony c.38 BC, taking the epithet Philantonios ("friend of Antony"). He died fighting on Antony's behalf at the Battle of Actium in 31 BC. His descendants, the Tarcondimotids, continued to rule Upper Cilicia until AD 17, when the emperor Tiberius incorporated their territory into the Roman provincial system.

== Name ==
The name Tarcondimotus is a Hellenised rendering of the indigenous Luwian theophoric compound Tarhu[nt]-mu(ua)ta, in which the prefix Tarhu[nt] denotes the omnipotent sky-god of the Taurus mountains, and the suffix mu(ua)ta suggests something akin to "the strength of." The name may therefore be translated as "the strength of Tarhu[nt]."

== Toparch of Upper Cilicia ==
=== Origins and Early Rule ===
Tarcondimotus was the son of Strato, known from an honorary inscription at Hierapolis-Castabala. Although Strato's own name is Greek, his son was given a Hellenized name of Luwian origin, suggesting the family belonged to the Hellenized indigenous Cilician elite. Syme and Wright speculated that Strato may have held regional authority preceding his son.

Tarcondimotus rose to prominence during the collapse of the Seleucid Kingdom in the early first century BC. Strabo records that Tarcondimotus secured control of the strategic highland strongholds of Mount Amanus, which had previously been in the possession of "several powerful tyrants." The core of Tarcondimotus' territory comprised the cities of Anazarbus and Castabala, along with the surrounding regions of Bryclice, Characene, and Lacanitis. Tarcondimotus (or his father Strato) was confirmed in his holdings as part of Pompey's eastern settlement following his campaigns against Mithridates VI of Pontus and the reorganization of the region in 66-63 BC. In this settlement Pompey recognized a number of local dynasts across the Near East as client rulers subordinate to Rome, and Tarcondimotus was among them, holding the title of toparch rather than king.

However, Castabala and the east Cilician plain were at the same time attached by Pompey to the neighboring Kingdom of Cappadocia. Although the original capital of Tarcondimotus' dominion may have been Castabala, its transfer to Ariobarzanes I of Cappadocia by Pompey indicates that Anazarbus, the site of the royal mint, subsequently served as the administrative center of the kingdom. Castabala remained under Cappadocian control for some years thereafter, and Syme suggested that it may have passed back to Tarcondimotus only following the assassination of Ariobarzanes II of Cappadocia c. 52 BC, when the Cappadocian kingdom underwent significant territorial revision.

=== Parthian Threat ===
It was around this time that Tarcondimotus first appears in the historical record. In 51 BC, Cicero, serving as proconsul of Cilicia, received urgent intelligence from Tarcondimotus warning that the Parthian crown prince, Pacorus, had crossed the Euphrateswith an army and invaded Syria. Cicero relayed this information to the Senate, describing Tarcondimotus as "the most loyal ally beyond the Taurus and the best friend to the Roman people."

Although Tarcondimotus securely held the lowland plain and its cities, Cicero found it necessary to conduct military operations against recalcitrant tribes in the southern sections of Mount Amanus. Cicero's campaign against the southern Amanus tribes was not merely to curb endemic banditry. According to Cicero, they "were eagerly expecting the arrival of the Parthians." The tribes may have risen in support of the Parthian invasion precisely in order to shake off the authority of Tarcondimotus and his Roman allies. Setting out from Epiphania, Cicero stormed Erana, "the capital of Amanus," along with Sepyra and Commoris, before encamping at Arae Alexandri south of Issus. Cicero then conducted a prolonged siege of Pindenissus (perhaps the later Irenopolis), the high and strongly fortified town of the Eleutherocilices, "Free Cilicians", who Cicero said, "never submitted even to kings."

Despite Tarcondimotus being conspicuously absent from Cicero's account of these operations, he had certainly provided the proconsul with intelligence on Parthian movements and presumably lent some form of physical assistance. The successful conclusion of these operations likely extended Tarcondimotid influence southwards into previously ungovernable sections of the mountain range. The arrangement suited Rome equally well, as a friendly dynast securing the mountain passes between the provinces of Cilicia and Syria was a far more practical solution than directly governing the far reaches of Cilicia.

== King of Upper Cilicia ==
=== Caesar's Civil War ===
When civil war broke out between Julius Caesar and the Pompeian-led Senate in 49 BC, Tarcondimotus aligned himself with his earlier patron Pompey, providing ships for the Pompeian fleet in the Adriatic naval campaigns of 48 BC. Cilician ships were also listed among the allies in the Pompeian fleet led by Cassius Longinus against Sicily during the same campaign. Following Caesar's decisive victory at the Battle of Pharsalus, Tarcondimotus was pardoned along with other eastern allied rulers and confirmed in his position. Caesar may have granted Tarcondimotus the tria nomina around this time, conferring Roman citizenship upon him, as evidenced by the Latin name of his daughter Julia and the later appearance of the name Gaius Julius Strato among his descendants.

=== Liberators' Civil War ===
Following Caesar's assassination in 44 BC, his conspirators fled Rome and sought support in the East. Cassius, whom Tarcondimotus had previously supported in Caesar's civil war, moved to Syria in 43 BC and brought Tarcondimotus into alliance with him against Octavian and Mark Antony. Following Cassius' defeat at Philippi in 42 BC, Tarcondimotus transferred his allegiance to Antony, the new master of the Roman East.

=== Recognition as King ===
In 40 BC, a Parthian invasion under Pacorus, whom had previously invaded Syria during Cicero's terms as proconsul of Cilicia, and the Pompeian holdout, Quintus Labienus, occupied the province of Syria, drawing many regional dynasts into an anti-Roman alliance. Tarcondimotus did not submit to the Parthians but continued to protect the flank of Roman-controlled Anatolia. In recognition of this loyalty, Antony granted him the royal title c.38 BC. Strabo records that he "was named king by the Romans because of his manly virtues (andragathiai)." A recently identified coronation coin issue, a small bronze denomination showing a flying eagle carrying a diadem accompanied by the TAPK monogram, has been interpreted as commemorating this grant of kingship, with the eagle symbolizing Rome conferring the diadem of royalty upon Tarcondimotus. Upon receiving the royal title, Tarcondimotus took the epithet Philantonios (Antony-lover) as an expression of his devotion to Antony. He minted bronze coins bearing this epithet alongside his name and royal title.

=== Death at Actium ===
As the conflict between Antony and Octavian approached its climax, Tarcondimotus, by then in his late sixties or early seventies, led his own fleet in support of Antony. He was serving under the admiral Gaius Sosius, Antony's supreme naval commander, off the west coast of Greece, alongside the fleets of Cleopatra VII of Egypt and the other eastern client kings.

Immediately prior to the main naval encounter at Actium, Sosius engaged and routed the fleet of Octavian's junior admiral Tarius, using a thick sea mist to cover his approach. In the ensuing pursuit, however, the Antonian fleet was in turn engaged and decisively defeated by Marcus Agrippa's newly arrived forces. Tarcondimotus led his own squadron during the engagement and died fighting against Agrippa; he was the only eastern client king to fall in the battle. His sons deserted Mark Antony's cause after Octavian's victory in the Battle of Actium. Tarcondimotus was succeeded as king by his eldest surviving son, Philopator I, though Octavian would strip him of the royal title within the year, though Philopator appears to have retained his position as toparch of Upper Cilicia.

In 20 BC, Augustus restored the royal title to Tarcondimotus II, the younger brother of Philopator I. In 19 BC, Tarcondimotus II refounded the kingdom's capital Anazarbos as Caesarea in a demonstrative act of loyalty to the Roman princeps. He was succeeded by his son, Philopator II, the last Tarcondimotid king who died in AD 17. According to Tacitus, at Philopator II's death the population of the kingdom was divided between a small monarchist faction and those who sought direct Roman rule. Tiberius resolved the question by incorporating the territory directly within the Roman provincial system.
