= Justinopolis =

Justinopolis (Greek: Ιουστινούπολις) may refer to several cities named after Justin I or Justin II:

- Justinopolis in Cilicia, a former name of Anavarza, Turkey
- Justinopolis in Istria, a former name of Koper, Slovenia
- Justinopolis in Osrhoene, a former name of Urfa, Turkey
