= Cilician pirates =

Generic term used for all pirates of the Mediterranean Sea in the 2nd and 1st century BC

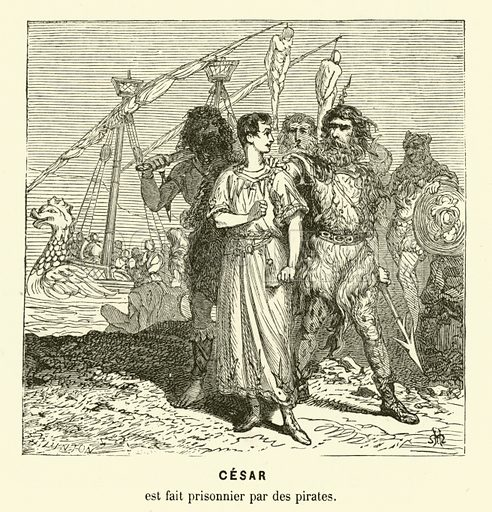
Julius Caesar taken captive by Cilician pirates (Henri De Montaut, 1865)

Cilician pirates dominated the Mediterranean Sea from the 2nd century BC until their suppression by Pompey in 67–66 BC. Because there were notorious pirate strongholds in Cilicia, on the southern coast of Asia Minor (modern-day Turkey), the term "Cilician" was long used to generically refer to any pirates in the Mediterranean.

== Rise of piracy ==
With the destruction of Carthage, the demise of the Seleucid Empire, and Ptolemaic Egypt on the wane, there was no strong naval power left in the Mediterranean. Rome was the only major Mediterranean power left, but, being land-based, it had a reduced navy at that time and relied on hiring ships as needed. Rome protected the Tyrrhenian and Adriatic seas, on account of their proximity, with expeditions sent against the pirate bases on the Ligurian and Illyrian coast.

As a result, the pirates became consolidated and organized. The smaller communities of the Greek and African waters were left to make their own arrangements. Communities unable to fend off the pirate incursions were forced to come to an understanding with the pirates, and thus became havens.

Crete was still independent. Civil wars had devastated the land, and much of the population turned to piracy. Crete became a major haven for pirates, with its strategic position in the midst of the Mediterranean and because it did not fall under the control of any of the Mediterranean empires.

Cilicia was the other major pirate refuge. Like Crete, Cilicia enjoyed excellent natural harbours which geography rendered easily defensible. The Seleucids, who ruled over most of Cilicia, were too weak to suppress them, and Diodotus Tryphon, king of the Seleucid Empire from 142–138 BC, actually supported them, in order to strengthen his position.

Around 140 BC, Rome sent Scipio Aemilianus to assess the situation. He reported that the governments of the region were too weak or unwilling to settle the issue. Rome at this time was unwilling to spend the effort needed to reduce the Cilician pirates, perhaps because of the benefits piracy afforded the Romans (the pirates supplied the Romans with cheap slaves – captured during their raids).

Consequently, the pirates remained the only considerable naval power in the Eastern Mediterranean. They eventually had bases throughout the Mediterranean.

The piracy problem in the Mediterranean increased over the decades: A large network of pirates coordinated operations over wide areas, with large fleets. According to Cassius Dio, many years of war contributed to this. Many war fugitives joined them. Pirates were more difficult to catch or break up than bandits. The pirates pillaged coastal fields and towns. Rome was affected through shortages of imports such as grain, but the Romans did not pay proper attention to the problem. They sent out fleets when ‘they were stirred by individual reports’ and these did not achieve anything. Cassius Dio wrote that these operations caused greater distress for Rome's allies. It was thought that a war against the pirates would be big and expensive and that it was impossible to attack all the pirates at once or to drive them back everywhere. As not much was done against them, some towns were turned into pirate winter quarters and raids further inland were carried out. Many pirates settled on land in various places and relied on an informal network of mutual assistance. Towns in Italy were also attacked, including Ostia, the port of Rome: ships were burnt and there was pillaging. The pirates seized important Romans and demanded large ransoms.

Plutarch also linked the worsening of the piracy problem to war and did so in more specific terms. The Third Mithridatic War (73–63 BC) against king Mithridates VI of Pontus (in modern northern Turkey) played a part in giving the pirates boldness because piracy lent itself to Mithridates’ service. This suggested that Mithridates fostered piracy as a means to weaken the Romans. Plutarch also thought that with the civil wars in Rome the Romans left the sea unguarded, which gave the pirates the confidence to lay waste islands and coastal cities in addition to attacking ships at sea. Piracy spread from its original base in Cilicia (on the southern coast of modern Turkey). The pirates also seized and ransomed some towns. Men of distinction also got involved in piracy. Plutarch claimed that pirates had more than 1,000 ships, that they captured 400 towns and plundered temples in Greece and sacred and inviolable sanctuaries, listing fourteen of them. He cited the praetors Sextilius and Bellinus and the daughter of Antonius among the important Romans who were seized for a ransom. The pirates also mocked their captives if they were Romans. Piracy spread over the whole of the Mediterranean, making it unnavigable and closed to trade. This caused scarcity of provisions.

Appian attributed the escalation of piracy to Mithridates plundering the Roman province of Asia extensively in 88 BC and the rest of the First Mithridatic War (89–85 BC). The destitute people who lost their livelihood became pirates. At first, they scoured the sea with a few small boats. As the war dragged on they became more numerous and used larger ships. When the war ended piracy continued. They sailed in squadrons, besieged towns or took them by storm and plundered them, and kidnapped rich people for ransom. The ragged part of the Cilician coast became their main area for anchorage and encampment and the Crags of Cilicia (the promontory of Coracesium) became their main base. It also attracted men from Pamphylia, Pontus, Cyprus, Syria and elsewhere in the east. There were soon tens of thousands of pirates and they dominated the whole Mediterranean. They defeated some Roman naval commanders, even off the coast of Sicily. The sea became unsafe. This disrupted trade and some lands remained untilled, leading to food shortages and hunger in Rome. Eliminating such a scattered and large force from no particular country and of an intangible and lawless nature seemed a difficult task. In Appian's opinion Lucius Licinius Murena and his successor Publius Servilius Vatia Isauricus (78–74 BC) did not accomplish anything against them.

Cilicia had been a haven for pirates for a long time. It was divided into two parts, Cilicia Trachaea (rugged Cilicia), a mountainous area in the west, and Cilicia Pedias (flat Cilicia) in the east by the Limonlu River. The first Roman campaign against the pirates was led by Marcus Antonius in 102 BC. Parts of Cilicia Pedias became Roman territory. Only a small part of that area became a Roman province. Publius Servilius Vatia Isauricus was given the command of fighting piracy in Cilicia in 78–74 BC. He won several naval victories off Cilicia and occupied the coasts of nearby Lycia and Pamphylia. He received his agnomen of Isaurus because he defeated the Isauri who lived in the core of the Taurus Mountains, which bordered on Cilicia. He incorporated Isauria into the province of Cilicia Pedias. However, much of Cilicia Pedias belonged to the kingdom of Armenia. Cilicia Trachea was still under the control of the pirates.

== Slave trade ==
One of the pirates' main sources of income was slavery. Rome's economy had become dependent on slaves as Roman landowners held large plantations worked by them. Sicily was particularly notorious for its large Roman estates worked by slaves from all over the Mediterranean. When the Republic was not at war, it needed an alternative supply and so it turned to the pirates, who were Rome's most consistent supplier. That had the additional effect of powerful interest groups in Rome (mainly the business class) who lobbied for inactivity.

The island of Delos became the centre of the Mediterranean slave market; other markets included those of Rhodes and Alexandria. In its heyday, 10,000 slaves passed through Delos' markets in a single day. With the plantations came a harsher system of slavery and greater demand. Western Asia was the main supply and was reduced by piracy and Roman tax farmers.

== Rome and the pirates ==
By the 1st century BC, what began as a nuisance became a plague on the Mediterranean commerce. The Cilician pirates roamed across the entire Mediterranean, and began to attack the towns of Italy itself. In fact, even Ostia was plundered. There were three campaigns, first by Marcus Antonius Creticus in 102 BC, and second by Publius Servilius Vatia Isauricus in 78–74 BC. The pirates regrouped a few years after, and a third campaign by Pompey 66 BC permanently removed the Cilician pirates from the Mediterranean.

=== Marcus Antonius' 102 BC campaign ===
Eventually, Rome took action. In 102 BC, the Romans sent Marcus Antonius the Orator to Cilicia with an army and a fleet. The pirates were no match for this onslaught so they fled, Antonius proclaimed victory, and the Senate awarded him a triumph. But the pirates merely regrouped on Crete, and soon returned to their old bases in Cilicia and piracy resumed. For over two decades Rome, occupied with other threats, ignored the problem again.

=== Publius Servilius' 78–74 BC campaign ===
In 79 BC, Publius Servilius Vatia Isauricus was allocated the province of Cilicia and a command against the pirates. From 78–74 BC, he led a naval and land campaign against pirate bases in Cilicia (the land campaign was aimed at the Isauri). Although Servilius Vatia was awarded a Triumph he did not solve the problem; his campaign was only a temporary relief and after he left the pirate problem resurfaced.

=== Pompey's 66 BC campaign ===
In 68 BC, the pirates launched a raid at Ostia, barely fifteen miles from Rome, by sailing into the harbour and burning the consular war fleet. The port went up in flames and the grip of famine tightened around Rome. Starving citizens took to the Forum, demanding action.

Finally, after heated debate, under the lex Gabinia Pompey was granted extraordinary powers to eliminate the Cilician pirates. He organized his efforts in a two-stage campaign, first clearing the western Mediterranean, and second overwhelming the pirates trapped in the eastern Mediterranean. The western campaign lasted 40 days. The eastern campaign lasted 49 days. In total, Pompey's campaign removed the Cilician pirates, who had held a stranglehold on Mediterranean commerce and threatened Rome with famine, in a mere 89 days in the summer of 66 BC.

==== Western campaign ====
Pompey divided the Mediterranean into thirteen districts, to each of which he assigned a fleet and a commander. Pompey then swept through the western Mediterranean with his own powerful fleet, driving the pirates out or into the paths of his other commanders.

By keeping vigilance over all the sea at the same time (and at great cost), there was nowhere to run or hide. Those Cilician pirates that did escape fled to the eastern Mediterranean. Pompey completed this first part of his campaign in 40 days.

==== Eastern campaign ====
Pompey then turned to the eastern Mediterranean. He gave mild terms to those pirates who surrendered to him personally, as opposed to his other commanders. Some pirates surrendered their ships, their families and themselves up to Pompey. From these, he learned about where others were hiding.

Many pirates retreated to their strongholds of Asia Minor, where they gathered and waited for Pompey to attack them. At Coracesium Pompey won a decisive victory and blockaded the town. The Cilician pirates surrendered all their harbours and fortified islands.

==== Peaceful resettlement ====
The Romans took the wealth the pirates had collected, and released many of their prisoners, (prisoners of worth whom the pirates intended to ransom), but other prisoners were still sold into slavery. Strabo writes that Pompey destroyed 1,300 pirate vessels of all sizes.

Pompey spared the lives of numerous Cilician pirates who had been taken prisoner, realizing that many had been driven to such recourse by desperation. Those who surrendered were settled in various parts of the southern coast of Asia Minor, where the population was sparse. Many were settled at Soli, which was thereafter called Pompeiopolis. Other settlements were created at Mallus, Adana, and Epiphaneia in Cilicia.

== Notable encounters ==
=== Quintus Sertorius ===
When Quintus Sertorius, the renegade Roman general, was driven from Hispania, he fell in with Cilician pirates. Together they attacked and took Pityussa, the most southerly of the Balearic Islands, which they started using as a base. When the governor of Hispania Ulterior found out he sent a war-fleet and almost a full legion which drove Sertorius and the pirates from the Balearics. They regrouped in Baetica where the pirates decided to break with Sertorius and sail to Africa to help install the tyrant Ascalis (a man supported by Sertorius's Roman opponents) on the throne of Tingis. Sertorius followed them to Africa, rallied the Mauritanians around Tingis, and defeated Ascalis and the pirates in battle.

=== Julius Caesar ===
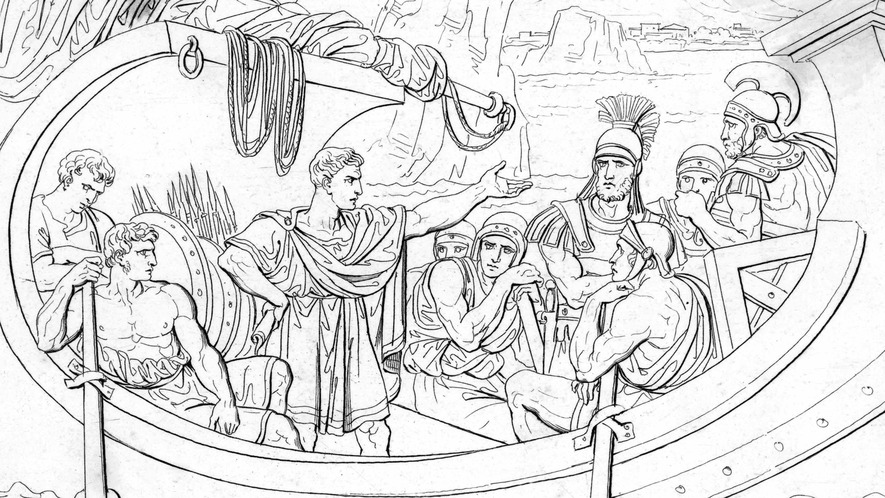
Caesar harangues his pirate captors (Bettmann, 1820)

When Sulla died in 78 BC, Julius Caesar returned to Rome as a lawyer, prosecuted Sulla's supporters, and headed to the Greek city of Rhodes to study oratory. Pirates seized his vessel in 75 BC, kidnapped Caesar (then aged 25), and held him for ransom. Caesar felt insulted at the twenty talents (480,000 sesterces) ransom and insisted that the pirates raise the demand to fifty talents (1,200,000 sesterces) more suitable for his status; his retinue quickly raised the money in the local cities, before returning to the pirate stronghold.

Caesar had decided that he would crucify the pirates after he was free. After the money was paid and he was released he assembled a small army and a fleet, after which he captured the pirates and crucified them as he had promised while in captivity – a promise that the pirates had taken as a joke. As a form of leniency, he first had their throats cut.

=== Spartacus ===
During the slave rebellion known as the Third Servile War, Spartacus was said to have brokered a deal with the Cilician pirates, hoping to smuggle a force of rebels across to Sicily. Sometime in 71 BC, the pirates deserted Spartacus and he had to give up his plans to cross over to Sicily.

=== Publius Clodius ===
In 67 BC, the Roman governor of Cilicia, Quintus Marcius Rex, sent his brother-in-law, Publius Clodius Pulcher, with a war fleet to patrol the coastline of his province. While on this patrol Clodius was seized by the pirates he had been sent to hunt down. Hoping to win his release, Clodius promised his captors a substantial reward, and they solicited a ransom from Ptolemy of Cyprus, an ally of the Romans. The amount offered was so paltry (two talents) that it was clear that Clodius had greatly overestimated his worth, the amused pirates released him anyway.

== Pirate culture ==
Plutarch recounts a particular custom of the Cilician pirates. When one of their prisoners called out that he was Roman, the pirates would pretend to be scared and beg for mercy. If the prisoner took the pirates' mockery in earnest, they would dress him in Greek athletic shoes and a toga so that they might not repeat the mistake. After they were satisfied mocking him, they would lower a ladder into the sea and, wishing him a fortuitous journey, invite him to step off. If the man would not go of his own accord, they would push him overboard.

According to Plutarch, the Cilician pirates were the first to celebrate the mysteries of Mithras. When some of them were resettled in Apulia by Pompey, they might have brought the religion with them, thus sowing the seeds of what would in the latter part of the 1st century AD blossom into Roman Mithraism.

== See also ==
- Thalassocracy
- Pompey's campaign against pirates

== Bibliography ==
- Theodor Mommsen. The History of Rome, Book IV. Translated by William Purdie Dickson.
- Long, George (2011). Decline of the Roman Republic. British Library. ISBN 978-1-241-43737-4. OCLC 942693599.
