= List of Roman governors of Cilicia =

This is a list of known governors of the Roman province of Cilicia. Although imperium along the southern coast of Asia Minor had been assigned to various propraetors beginning in 104 BC, it was only annexed to the Roman Republic as a province in 64 BC by Pompey as a consequence of his victory in the Third Mithridatic War. Cyprus was included in this province from 58 BC until 27 BC. Further subtractions and additions to its territory were made until AD 72, after which its boundaries were unchanged until Diocletian divided the province into three parts: Cilicia Prima, under a consularis; Cilicia Secunda, under a praeses; and Isauria, also under a praeses. Although passing into Byzantine control following the division of the Empire into Western and Eastern parts, these later provinces were lost in the seventh century as a result of the Muslim conquest of the Levant.

== Republican province ==
The list of governors from 96 BC to 31 BC is based on Thomas Robert Shannon Broughton, The Magistrates of the Roman Republic, vol. II and David Magie, Roman Rule in Asia Minor to the End of the Third Century After Christ, pp. 1594–1596.

- Sulla — circa 96 BC
- Gnaeus Cornelius Dolabella — 80 BC
- Publius Servilius Vatia Isauricus — 78—74 BC
- Lucius Octavius — 74 BC
- Lucius Licinius Lucullus Ponticus — 73—65 BC
- Quintus Marcius Rex — 67—66 BC
- Pompey the Great — 65—62 BC
- Titus Ampius Balbus — 57—56 BC
- Publius Cornelius Lentulus Spinther — 56—53 BC
- Appius Claudius Pulcher — 53—51 BC
- Cicero — 51—50 BC
- Gaius Coelius Caldus — 50 BC
- Publius Sestius — 49—47 BC
- Quintus Phylippus — 47—46 BC
- Quintus Cornificius — 46—45 BC
- Lucius Volcatius Tullus — 45—44 BC

== Imperial province ==
The list of governors from 31 BC to the mid-third century is based on Bernard Rémy, Les carrières sénatoriales dans les provinces romaines d'Anatolie au Haut-Empire (31 av. J.-C. - 284 ap. J.-C.) (Istanbul: Institut Français d'Études Anatoliennes-Georges Dumézil, 1989), pp. 341–357.

- Cossutianus Capito—c. AD 50s
- Publius Nonius Asprenas Caesius Cassianus—c. 72/73-73/74
- Septimius—74/75-75/76 ?
- L. Octavius Memor—76/77-77/78
- Tiberius Julius Celsus Polemaeanus—88/89-90/91 ?
- Q. Gellius Longus—91/92-93/94
- Marcus Titius Lustricus Bruttianus—Before 108
- Marcus Pompeius Macrinus—c. 110/111-112/113
- Titus Calestrius Tiro—113/114-115/116
- Gaius Bruttius Praesens—c. 116/117-117/118
- Jul(ius) Castus? or Jul(ius) Gallus? -- c. 118/119-119/120
- Titus Vibius Varus—130/131-132/133
- Publius Pactumeius Clemens—136/137-138/139
- Gaius Julius Plancius Varus Cornutus—Between 119 and 138
- Aulus Claudius Charax—144/145-145/146 or 146/147
- Gaius Etrilius Regillus Laberius Priscus—147-149
- Publius Cornelius Dexter— c. 157
- L. Saevinius Proculus—c. 174/175-176/177
- [...]isus (?) Claudius Silus Q. Plautius Haterianus—c. 177/178-178/179
- Marcus (?) Claudius Cassius Apronianus—c.182/183
- Q. Venidius Rufus Marius Maximus L. Calvinianus—c. 194/196
- M. (?) Antonius Balbus—c. 198-200
- Antonius [...]ius—198/209
- Flavius Ulpianus—c. 202
- Flavius Julianus—c. 215/216-217/218
- Rutilianus—c. 215
- Ostor[ius?] -- Between 222 and 235
- M. Domitius Valerianus—Between 222 and 235
- L. Servius [...]us Zeno—Between 238 and 244
- Caecilius Arellianus (procurator) -- Between 211 and 249
- C. Mevius Donatus Junianus—1st half 3rd century
- A. Voconius Zeno—Between 253 and 268

== See also ==
- Lists of ancient Roman governors
