= Battle of Korakesion =

Naval battle

- Part of Pompey's campaign against pirates
Date	67 BC
Location	Korakesion, Roman Republic (modern-day Alanya, Antalya, Turkey) 36°31′48″N 32°00′36″E
Result	Roman victory

Belligerents
Roman Republic	Cilician pirates

Commanders and leaders
Pompey	Unknown

Strength
200 ships (Roman claim)	1,000 ships (Roman claim)

Casualties and losses
Unknown	3,000 pirates surrendered
- Location within Turkey

The Battle of Korakesion, also known as the Battle of Coracaesium, was a naval battle fought in 67 BC between the Cilician Pirates and the Roman Republic. It was the culmination of Pompey the Great's campaign against the pirates of the Mediterranean; Plutarch describes it as the key battle of Pompey's clearing of the Mediterranean of pirates after several smaller battles. According to Plutarch the pirates had about a thousand ships (almost certainly an exaggeration) against Pompey's two hundred, but were defeated in the initial naval engagement. Florus also states it was not a hard-fought affair as the pirates soon realised they were out-classed and most of them simply surrendered. After retreating to the shore, the remaining pirates were apparently besieged in the town of Coracaesium, modern day Alanya, before surrendering.

== See also ==
- Pompey's campaign against the pirates
