= Philometor =

Philometor (Greek: Φιλομήτωρ), meaning "mother-loving", was a common royal epithet among Hellenistic monarchs:

- Ptolemy VI Philometor, King of Egypt, r. 180 to 145 BC.
- Cleopatra Philometor Soteira, Queen of Egypt; c.160–101 BC; r. 142 to 131 BC, 127 to 101 BC.
- Paerisades IV Philometor, King of the Bosporan Kingdom; fl. c. 150 to 125 BC.
- Attalus III Philometor Euergetes, King of Pergamon; r. 138 to 133 BC.
- Seleucus V Philometor, Seleucid King; r. 126–125 BC.
- Antiochus VIII Philometor, Seleucid King; r. 125 to 96 BC.
- Ariarathes VII Philometor, King of Cappadocia; r. 116 or 111 BC to 101–100 BC.
- Seleucus VII Philometor, Seleucid King; r. 83–69 BC.
- Ptolemy XV Philopator Philometor Caesar, son of Cleopatra VII and Julius Caesar

== See also ==
- Eupator (disambiguation)
- Philopator (disambiguation)
- Philadelphos (disambiguation)
