= Eupator =

Several Hellenistic rulers used or adopted the name or epithet Eupator (Greek: Εὑπάτωρ) - the Greek word Ευ·πατωρ literally means "of well (= noble) father".

- Antiochus V Eupator of the Seleucid Empire (r. 164 BCE – 161 BCE)
- Mithridates VI Eupator, King of Pontus (r. 120 BCE – 63 BCE)
- Ptolemy Eupator, co-ruler of Cyprus in 152 BCE
- Tiberius Julius Eupator, client-king of the Bosporan Kingdom (died 170 CE)

== See also ==
- Eupatoria (disambiguation)
- Evpaty
- Philopator (disambiguation)
- Philometor (disambiguation)
- Philadelphos (disambiguation)
