= Asclepiades of Anazarba =

Ancient Greek writer of a work on rivers

Asclepiades (Ancient Greek: Ἀσκληπιάδης) or Asclepios of Anazarba in Cilicia was a historian of ancient Greece. He is mentioned by several ancient writers as the author of many works, though today we know specifics about only two of them: one was a work called On Rivers (περὶ ποταμῶν), and another was about the antiquities of his native city, The Land of Anazarba (πάτρια Ἀναζάρβου). Of his time, we know only that he lived at some point before the 6th century CE.
