= Philadelphus (disambiguation) =

Philadelphus is the scientific name of mock-oranges, a genus of shrubs.

Philadelphus is the Latinized form of the ancient Greek Philadelphos (Φιλάδελφος, meaning "brother-loving" or "sibling-loving"), it may also refer to:

People:

- Ptolemy II Philadelphus (309–246 BC), king of Ptolemaic Egypt 283 BC-246 BC
- Arsinoe II, given the epithet "Philadelphoi" (plural form) after marrying her brother Ptolemy II Philadelphus
- Mithridates IV Philopator Philadelphus (before 179- c.150 BC), king of Pontus c.155 –c.150 BC
- Attalus II Philadelphus (220–138 BC), king of Pergamon 160- 138 BC
- Laodice VII Thea Philadelphus (after 122 to after 86 BC), princess of the Seleucid Empire and later queen of Commagene
- Antiochus XI Ephiphanes Philadelphus (d. 92 BC), king of the Seleucid Empire 95-92 BC
- Philip I Philadelphus, king of the Seleucid Empire 95 BC-84/83 BC
- Ptolemy XII Auletes (Philopator Philadelphos), Ptolemaic king: r. 80 to 58 BC and 55 BC to 51 BC.
- Ptolemy Philadelphus (son of Cleopatra) (36-29 BC), prince of Ptolemaic Egypt 36 BC-30 BC, son of Mark Antony

- Deiotarus Philadelphus (died c.6 AD), last king of Paphlagonia before 31 BC-c.6AD
- Iotape Philadelphus (before 17- c. 52 AD), princess and later queen of Commagene
- Philadelphus of Byzantium, bishop of Byzantium 211-217 AD

- Philadelphus Philadelphia, stage name of Jacob Philadelphia, 1735-1795 CE

- Philadelphos/Philadelphus, Christian martyrs commemorated in the Eastern Orthodox liturgical calendar on February 8, May 10 and September 2

Other uses:

- Philadelphus Jeyes, the chain of pharmacies operated by the inventors of Jeyes Fluid
- Philadelphus, North Carolina, a Registered Historic Place in Robeson County, North Carolina

== See also ==
- Philadelphia (disambiguation)
- Phyladelphus, a genus of the fly family, Chloropidae
- Philometor (disambiguation), "mother-loving"
- Philopator (disambiguation), "father-loving"
- Eupator (disambiguation), "of noble father"
