= Eupatoria =

Eupatoria may refer to:

- Eupatoria or Yevpatoria, a city of Crimea
  - the Battle of Eupatoria, 1855
- Eupatoria (Pontus), an ancient city of Pontus
- Agrimonia eupatoria, common agrimony

== See also ==
- Eupator (disambiguation)
