= Cyinda =

Cyinda (Greek: Κὐινδα) was an ancient Cilician city, situated in Anatolia in modern Turkey.

Cyinda in western Cilicia was famous as a treasure city in the wars of Eumenes of Cardia. It apparently served as a collection point where booty from the Asian interior was stored for shipment to Macedonia. "Despite the removal of great quantities of wealth from Cyinda at various times by Antigonus and his son, Demetrius, this fortress continued to possess large amounts of treasure, and for years during the fourth and third centuries 'the gold of Cyinda' was world famous." Its exact location is unknown; it is possible that it is to be identified with the fortress known in Assyrian as Kundi, which played a similar role in the Assyrian Empire in the time of Esarhaddon. It was formerly wrongly identified with Anazarbus.

== Bibliography ==
- R.H. Simpson, "A Note on Cyinda," Historia 6 (1957): 503-04.
- J.D. Bing, "A Further Note on Cyinda/Kundi," Historia 22 (1973): 346-350.
