= Pompey's eastern settlement =

Political reorganization of the near eastern Roman Empire in the 60s BC

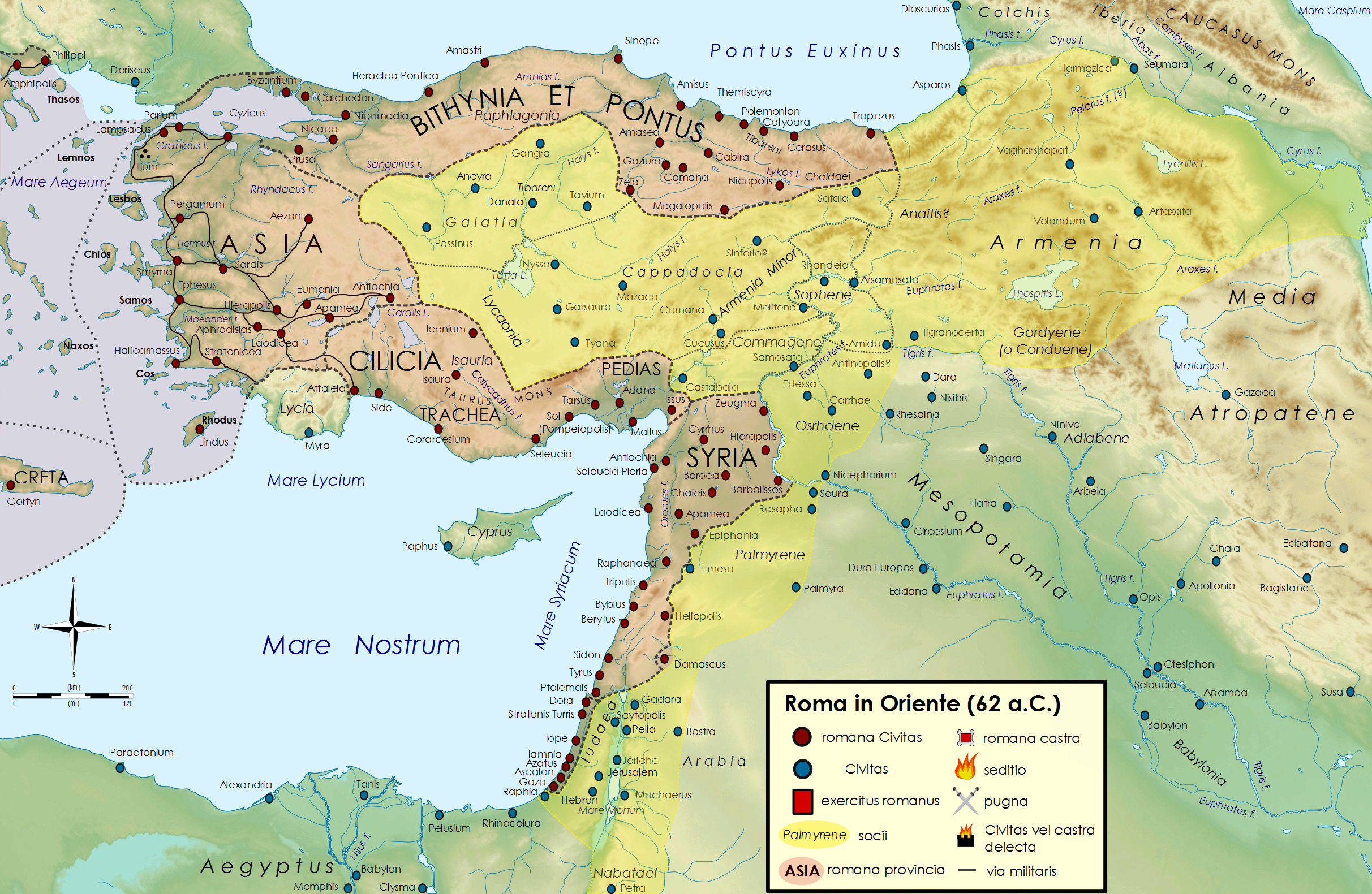
Map of the Roman East in 62 BC, after Pompey's reorganization. Roman provinces in red, client kingdoms in yellow

Pompey's eastern settlement was the reorganization of Asia Minor and the Levant carried out by the Roman general Pompey in the 60s BC, in the aftermath of his suppression of piracy, his victory in the Third Mithridatic War and the dissolution of the Seleucid Empire, which brought the entire Near East under Roman control. It involved the establishment of new Roman provinces: alongside an enlarged Asia, Bithynia and Pontus in the north and Cilicia in the south, while the Seleucid realm was annexed as the province of Syria. In the interior, a network of native client kingdoms was established as a buffer to the Parthian Empire. Broadly speaking, the area thus placed under direct Roman control was that nearest the coast of the Black Sea and the eastern Mediterranean. Here the long existence of cities with Greek traditions had created a social system which could be fitted with reasonable ease into the Roman method of administration.

Pompey also carried out reforms to the provincial administrative and taxation systems in the Roman East, and founded new cities. Although generally acknowledged as humane and sound, the Eastern Settlement was carried out without the advice or consent of the Roman Senate, and the reorganization was not ratified for several years due to senatorial opposition against Pompey, who stood to gain enormous prestige, as well as expand his patronage over the entire East. This eventually led Pompey to join forces with Crassus and Julius Caesar in the First Triumvirate; ratification of the eastern settlement was one of the main legislative planks of Caesar's first consulship in 59 BC. Many of the provisions of Pompey's survived for centuries, well into the Roman Empire.

== Sources ==
- Freeman, P.W.M. (1994). "Pompey's Eastern settlement. A matter of presentation?". Latomus. 227: 143–179.
- Greenhalgh, Peter (1980). Pompey. The Roman Alexander. Weidenfeld and Nicolson. ISBN 0-297-77640-1.
- Leach, John (1978). Pompey the Great. Croom Helm Ltd. ISBN 0-85664-659-8.
- Marshall, A. J. (1968). "Pompey's Organization of Bithynia-Pontus: Two Neglected Texts". The Journal of Roman Studies. 58: 103–109. doi:10.2307/299699. JSTOR 299699. S2CID 164063655.
- Morrell, Kit (2017). Pompey, Cato, and the Governance of the Roman Empire. Oxford University Press. ISBN 978-0-19-875514-2.
- Rising, Thilo (2013). "SENATORIAL OPPOSITION TO POMPEY'S EASTERN SETTLEMENT. A STORM IN A TEACUP?". Historia: Zeitschrift für Alte Geschichte. 62 (2): 196–221. JSTOR 24433672.
