= Epiphania (Cilicia) =

City in Cilicia, now ruined

Coordinates: 36°58′20″N 36°07′30″E

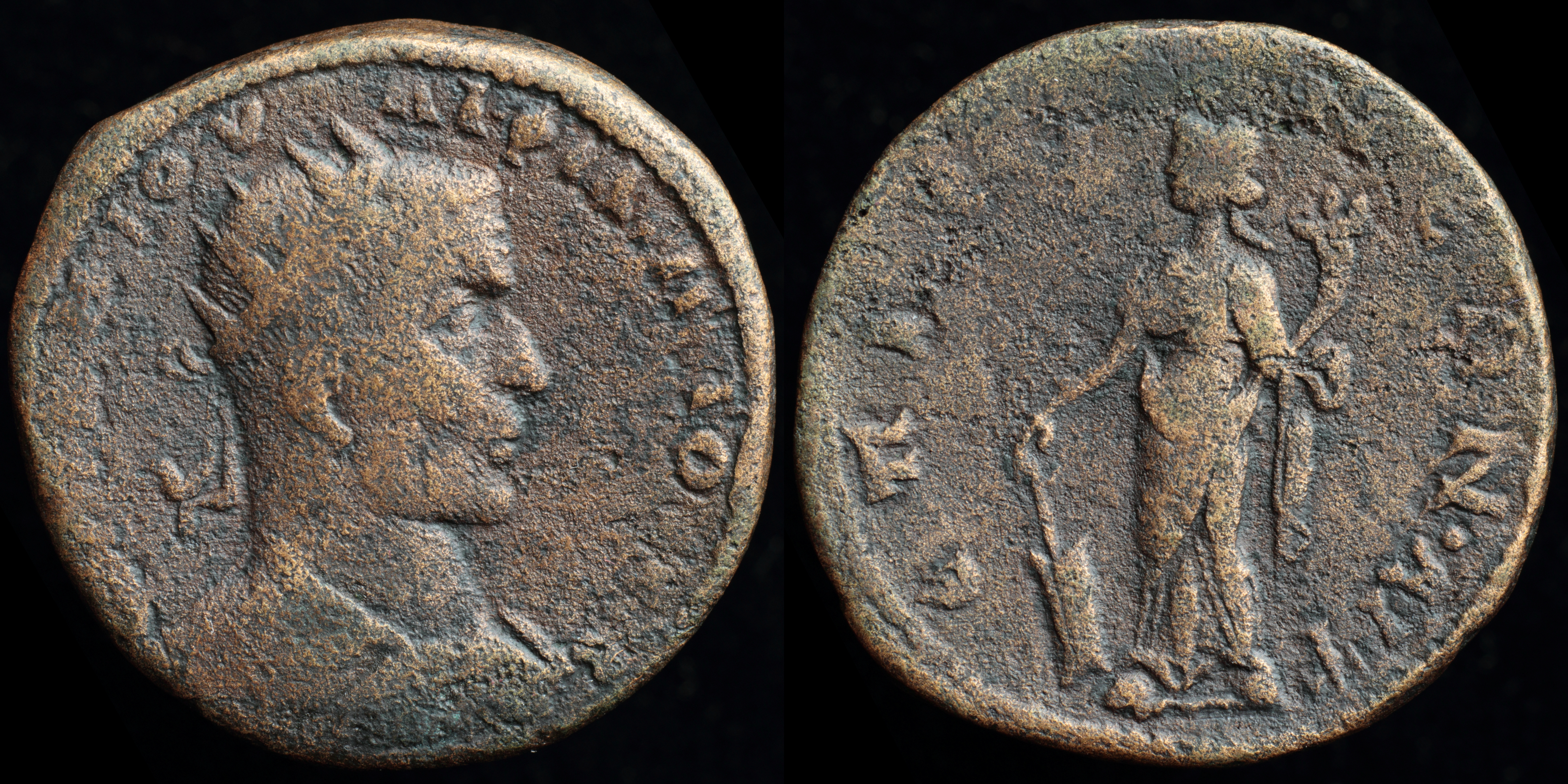
O: laureate draped and cuirassed bust

AVT K M IOV_ΛI ΦIΛIΠΠOC CEB

R: Tyche holding rudder and cornucopia

EΠIΦA_NEΩN·AIT^{*}

bronze coin struck by Philip the Arab in Epiphania 244-245 AD; ref.: L&K A1491B (same dies)

^{*}Epiphania dated their calendar from Pompey's victory over the Cilician pirates 67-66 BC.

Epiphania or Epiphaneia (Ancient Greek: Ἐπιφανεία) was a city in Cilicia Secunda (Cilicia Trachea), in Anatolia.

The city was originally called Oeniandos or Oiniandos, and was located in the area of the northern tip of the Gulf of Iskenderun, on the route from Missis to Antioch. In the 2nd century BC the city was renamed Epiphania, in honour of Antiochus IV Epiphanes, King of Syria from 175 BC to 164 BC.

The city is mentioned in the writings of Ptolemy, Ammianus and Pliny the Elder. Cicero stayed there briefly during his exile. In 66 BC, the Roman general Pompey led a campaign against the Mediterranean pirates. After the surrender of the pirates, they were dispersed and many were settled at Epiphania.

== Bishopric ==
According to Gibbon, Saint George was born here, in a fuller's shop

in the late 4th century. Saint Amphion was the earliest known bishop of Epiphania in 325, as a suffragan of the Bishop of Anazarbus. He attended the First Council of Nicaea in 325, and later suffered under the persecutions of Diocletian.

- Hesychius
- Polychronius
- Marinus
- Nicetus
- Basilius
- Paul

Today, its ruins include the remains of walls, a temple, an acropolis, an aqueduct, and many houses, all built in basalt.

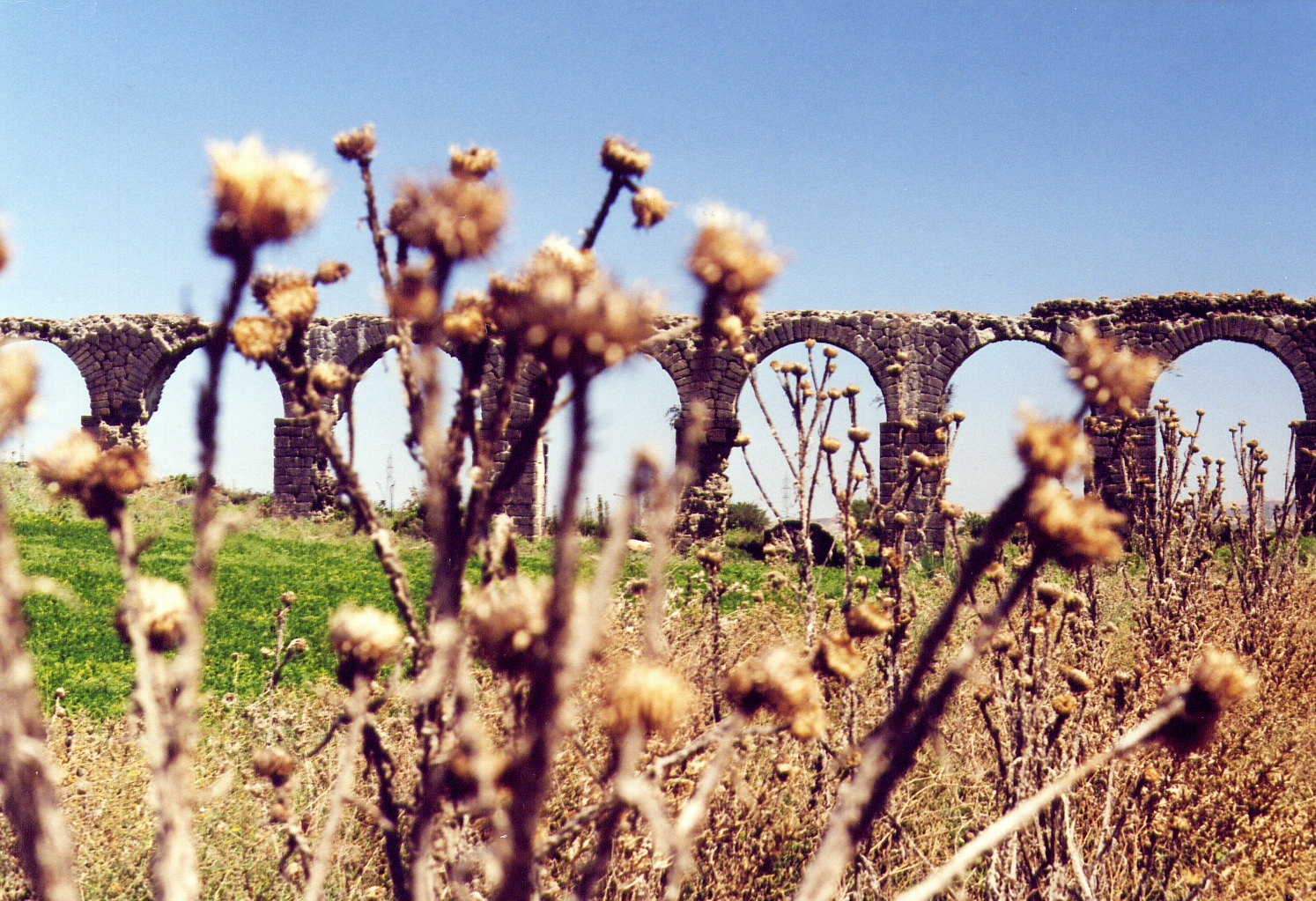
Aqueduct in Epiphania.
