= Pompey's campaign against the pirates =

Conflict between the Roman Republic and the Cilician pirates

- Part of the wars of the Roman Republic
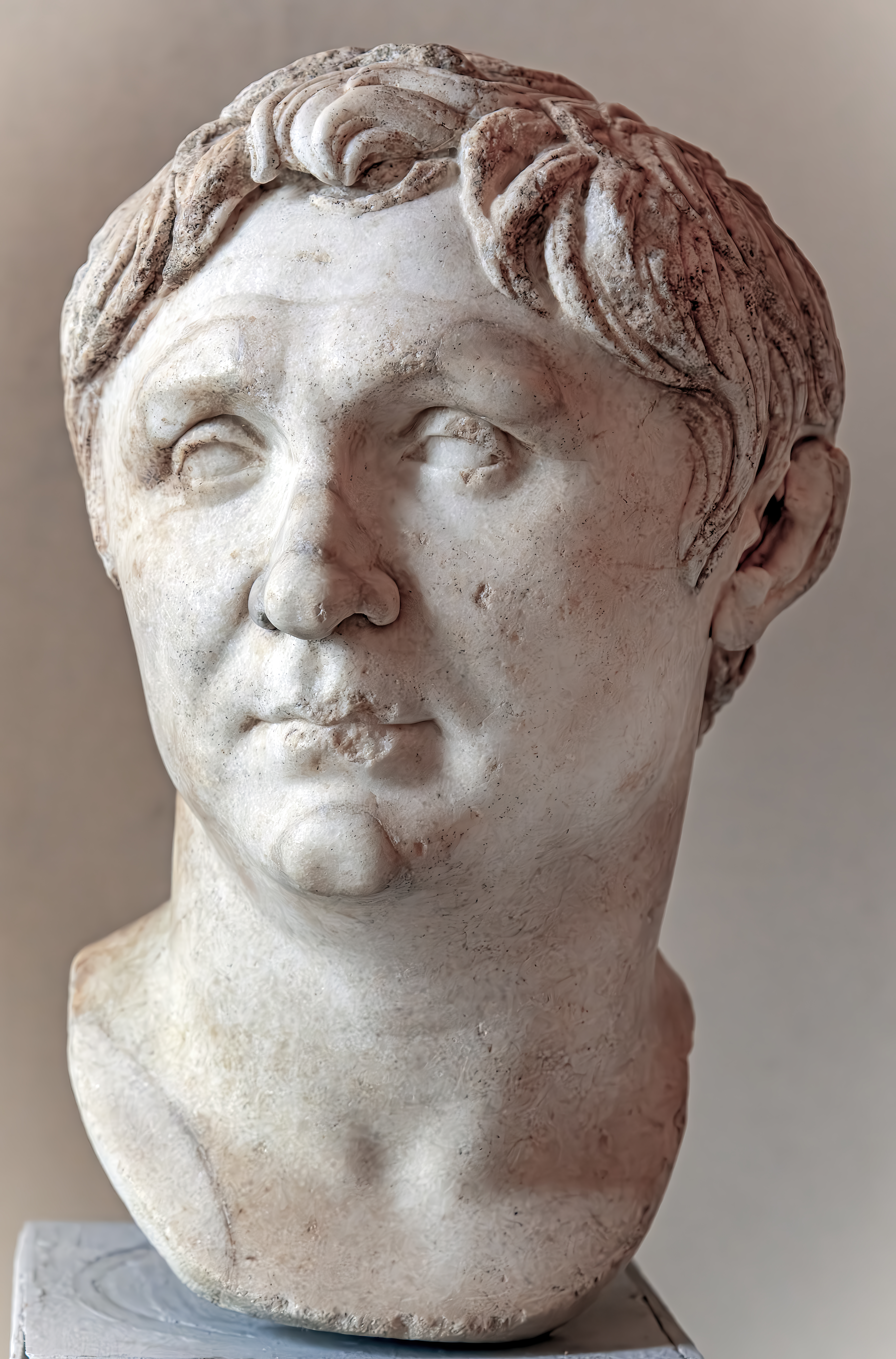
- Bust of Pompey, copy of an original from 70–60 BC, Venice National Archaeological Museum
Date	67 BC
Location	Anatolia, Crete and Aegean Sea
Result	Roman victory

Belligerents
Roman Republic and Rhodes	Cilician pirates

Commanders and leaders
Pompey	

Strength
270/500 ships 120,000 soldiers 4,000/5,000 horsemen	More than 1,000 ships

Casualties and losses
	377/800 ships captured 10,000 dead 20,000 captured 120 cities captured

Pompey's campaign against the pirates represented the final phase of the Roman Republic's efforts to combat piracy in the eastern Mediterranean, which had been adversely affecting the eastern Roman provinces. This campaign was completed in approximately 40 days under the command of Pompey in 67 B.C.

The pirates no longer sailed in small groups, but in large hosts, and they had their own commanders, who increased their fame [by their exploits]. They despoiled and plundered first of all those who sailed, not leaving them alone even in winter [...]; then also those who were in the ports. And if one dared to challenge them on the open sea, he was usually defeated and destroyed. If he then managed to beat them, he was unable to capture them, because of the speed of their ships. So the pirates would go right back and loot and burn not only villages and farms, but whole towns, while others made them allies, so much so that they wintered there and set up bases for new operations, as if it were a friendly country.

— Cassius Dio, Roman History, XXXVI, 21.1-3.

== Historical context ==
Rome's first intervention in the Aegean Sea in response to piracy occurred in 189 B.C., when Lucius Fabius Labeo, commander of the fleet, undertook a mission on the island of Crete. However, he was unsuccessful in securing the return of Roman citizens who had been captured by pirates.

Subsequent Roman interventions took place in the seas around Asia Minor following the establishment of the first province in the East, Asia (133—129 B.C.). In 102 B.C., the consul Marcus Antonius led a campaign in the Cilician area. His reported successes against pirate populations culminated in the establishment of a second Roman province, Cilicia, between 101 and 100 B.C. The latter province initially consisted of Lycaonia, Pisidia, Pamphylia, southeastern Phrygia, and part of Cilicia Trachea, although its coastline remained partially surrounded with pirates.

During the First Mithridatic War, Roman commander Quintus Brucius Sura initially faced Metrophanes with a small army, engaging in a naval confrontation in which he succeeded in sinking a large ship. He subsequently conducted raids on the harbor of Skiathos, a known pirate stronghold, where he executed slaves and mutilated freedmen who sought refuge there in 87 B.C. In the following years, from 86 to 85 BC, Sulla's legatus, Lucullus, was sent to collect a fleet consisting of ships from Cyprus, Phoenicia, Rhodes and Pamphylia. He faced multiple risks of capture by pirates while successfully ravaging much of their coastline.

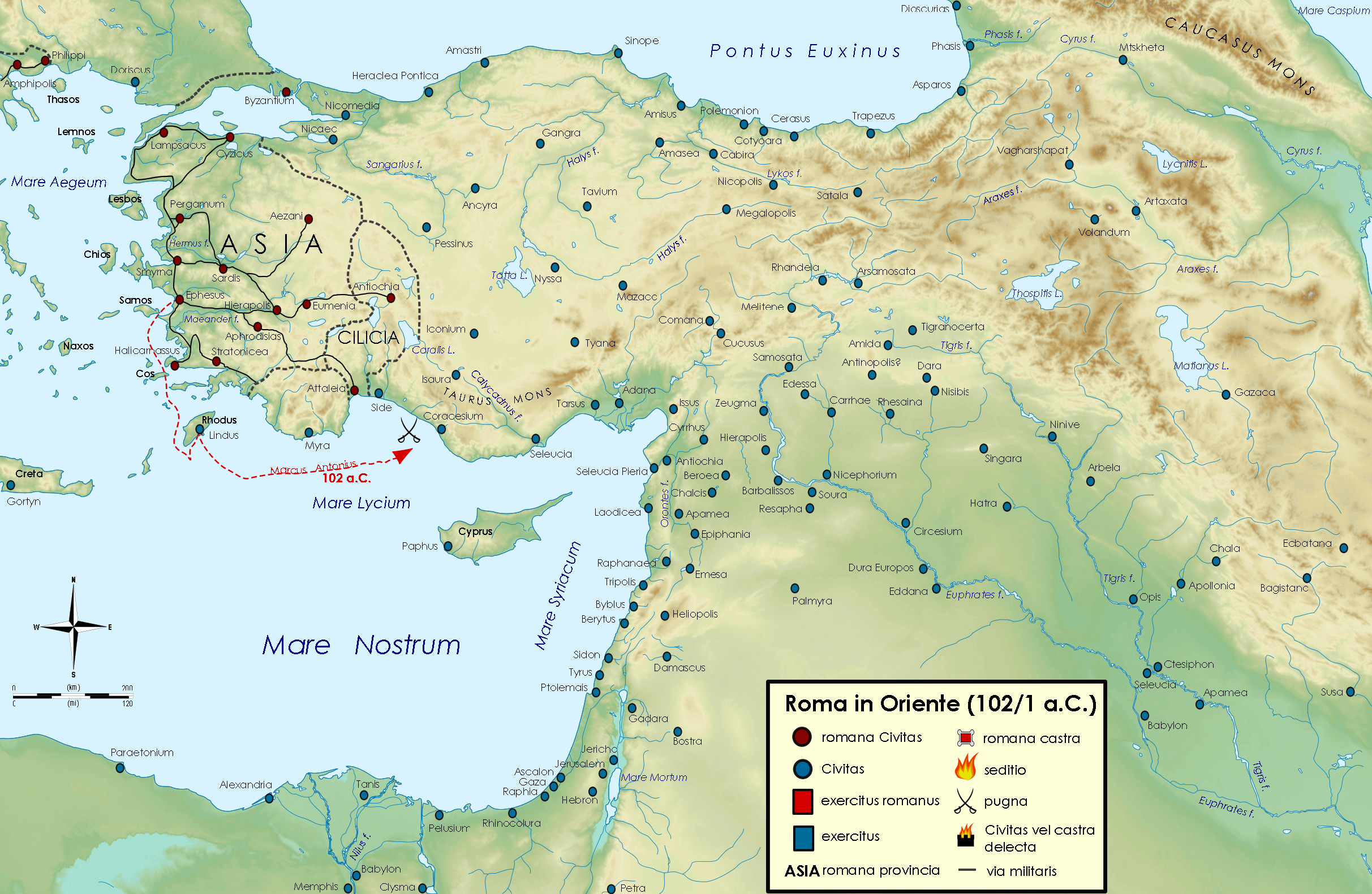
The second Roman province of Asia, Cilicia, conquered by Marcus Antonius during the military campaigns of 102 BC.

At the conclusion of the First Mithridatic War, the province of Asia was left in a state of significant distress. The conflict had subjected its territories to persistent assaults by numerous pirate bands, which operated more like organized fleets than mere brigands. Mithridates VI had facilitated this increase in piracy during his campaign against the Roman coasts, anticipating that he would not maintain control over these regions for long. Consequently, the number of pirates surged, leading to continuous attacks on ports, fortresses, and cities. The pirates captured several cities, including Iassus, Samos, Clazomenae, and even Samothrace, where Sulla was present at the time. It was reported that they plundered the temple on Samothrace, which housed treasures valued at 1,000 Attic talents. Plutarch noted that the number of pirate ships exceeded 1,000, and the settlements they overtook totaled at least 400. They attacked and looted previously untouched locations, including sanctuaries such as those at Claros, Didyma, and Samothrace, as well as temples dedicated to Chthonia Terra at Hermione, Asclepius at Epidaurus, and Poseidon at Isthmus, Taenarum, and Kalaureia. They also defiled temples of Apollo at Actium and Lefkada, and those of Hera at Samos, Argos, and Lacinium. Additionally, they engaged in unusual sacrifices at Olympus and celebrated secret rites, including those dedicated to Mitra.

Between 78 B.C. and 75 B.C., Publius Servilius Vatia served as proconsul of Cilicia, achieving significant victories against the pirates, who were equipped with fast, light warships, ultimately forcing them to retreat into the Isauric hinterland. Vatia, an energetic and resolute commander, swiftly captured the city of Olympus in Lycia from the pirate leader Zenicetus, who died defending it. He then advanced through Pamphylia, seizing Phaselis, and entered Cilicia, where he took the coastal fortress of Corycus. After reclaiming all the coastal cities from the pirates, Vatia led his army across the Taurus Mountains, marking the first Roman incursion into the region, and aimed for the Isaurian capital of Isaura. He achieved this by diverting a river to deprive the city of water, successfully capturing it. For his commendable leadership, he was acclaimed imperator by his troops and awarded the Isauric agnomen. Upon his return to Rome, he celebrated his triumph in 74 B.C.. It is also noted that the young Julius Caesar participated in these campaigns as a military tribune. However, following these victories, new pirate raids targeted the city of Brindisi and Etruria,resulting in the abduction of women from noble Roman families and even a few praetors.

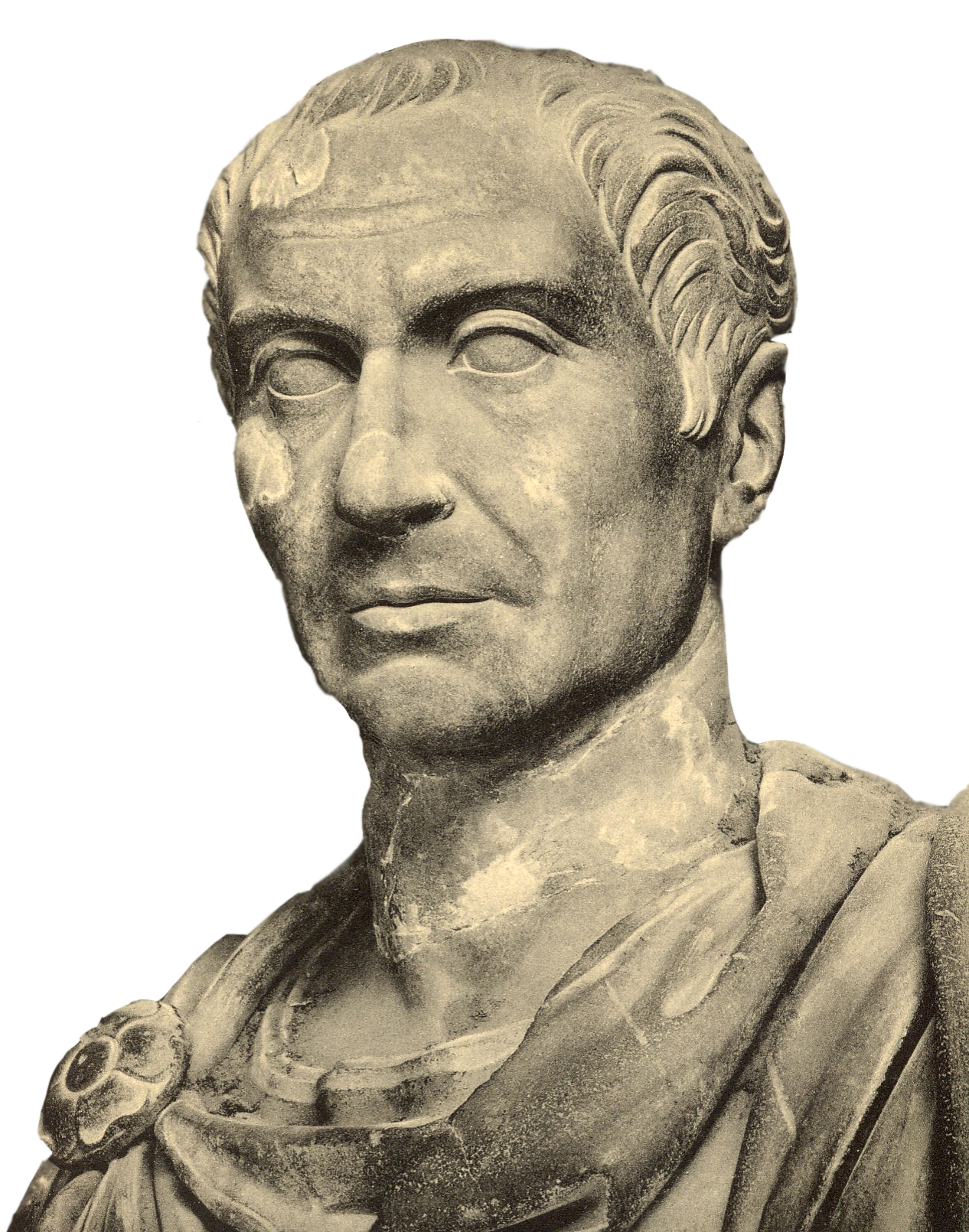
Bust of Caesar, who was seized by pirates in 74 BC.

In 74 B.C., Marcus Antonius Creticus, the father of Mark Antony, led an expedition to the seas around Crete, which ultimately ended in defeat. Following this, Quintus Caecilius Metellus Creticus undertook a new campaign, supported by the cities of Gortina (now Gortyn) and Polyrrhenion, which gradually subdued the main centers of anti-Roman resistance, including Cydonia, Knossos, Eleutera, Lappa, Lytto, and Hierapytna. This campaign faced challenges due to conflicts between Quintus Metellus and Lucius Octavius, a legate sent to the island by Pompey, who held extraordinary command against the pirates under the Gabinia law (lex Gabinia). After the successful conquest of Crete, Quintus Caecilius Metellus adopted the surname "Creticus." During this period, a notable incident involving the young Julius Caesar occurred. While en route to Rhodes in 74 B.C.—a destination favored by young Romans seeking to learn Greek culture and philosophy—he was kidnapped by pirates and taken to the island of Farmakonisi, located among the southern Sporades south of Miletus. When the pirates demanded a ransom of talents, Caesar countered that he would pay fifty talents and sent his companions to Miletus to collect the necessary funds. He chose to remain on Farmakonisi with two slaves and his personal physician. During his thirty-eight days in captivity, Caesar composed numerous poems, which he presented to his captors. He interacted with the pirates in a manner that suggested he was in command, repeatedly promising that he would have them executed once he regained his freedom. When Caesar's companions returned with the ransom money, he escaped to the province of Asia, where Marcus Iuncus served as propraetor. Upon reaching Miletus, Caesar equipped ships and returned to Farmakonisi, easily capturing the pirates. He then transported them to Bithynia, where Iuncus was managing the implementation of Nicomedes IV in his will. Although Caesar requested that the propraetor punish the pirates, Iuncus attempted to seize the ransom money for himself, and planned to resell the captives. Anticipating Iuncus's actions, Caesar set sail from Bithynia and executed the pirates himself, having them crucified after strangling them to spare them a prolonged death. According to pro-Cesarian sources, this act fulfilled his promise to the pirates during their captivity and allowed him to return the ransom money that his comrades had secured.

In 70 B.C., Praetor Caecilius Metellus successfully confronted the pirates surrounding the seas of Sicily and Campania, who had even sacked Gaeta, Ostia (in 69–68 B.C.) and had kidnapped the daughter of Marcus Antonius at Cape Miseno.

== Casus belli ==
By 69 B.C., Pompey had become a favored figure among the Roman masses, although many members of the optimates were wary of his intentions. His prominence in the state was bolstered by two extraordinary proconsular appointments, unprecedented in Roman history. In 67 BC, two years after serving as consul, Pompey was appointed commander of a special fleet tasked with conducting a campaign against the pirates surrounding the Mediterranean Sea. The Cilician pirates, in particular, had disrupted trade and relations among various populations, leading to widespread conflict and significant repercussions for maritime commerce, including the vital grain supply for the city of Rome. This situation had largely resulted from the Mithridatic Wars, which allowed these pirate bands to operate with impunity, plundering ports, cities, and merchant ships. Initially, the pirates, led by their commander Isodorus, restricted their activities to nearby waters, including those around Crete, Cyrene, Achaia, and Cape Maleas. The immense wealth derived from their plundering earned these waters the moniker "Golden Sea", but they eventually expanded their range of operations.

Pompey's appointment was controversial from the outset. The conservative faction in the Senate expressed suspicion regarding his intentions and feared the consolidation of his power. The optimates made numerous attempts to block his nomination. Notably, Julius Caesar was among the few senators who supported Pompey's leadership from the beginning. The nomination was ultimately advanced by the tribune of the plebs, Aulus Gabinius, who proposed the Lex Gabinia. This law granted Pompey command of the war against the Mediterranean pirates for a period of three years, conferring extensive powers that included absolute control over maritime operations and the coasts extending 400 stadia inland (approximately 70 km). This authority placed him above any military leader in the eastern provinces. In addition to these powers, Pompey was authorized to select 15 legates from the Senate to oversee key maritime areas, draw funds from the public treasury and tax collectors as needed, and command a fleet of 200 fully armed and equipped ships, including soldiers and oarsmen.

== Forces in the field ==
=== Romans ===
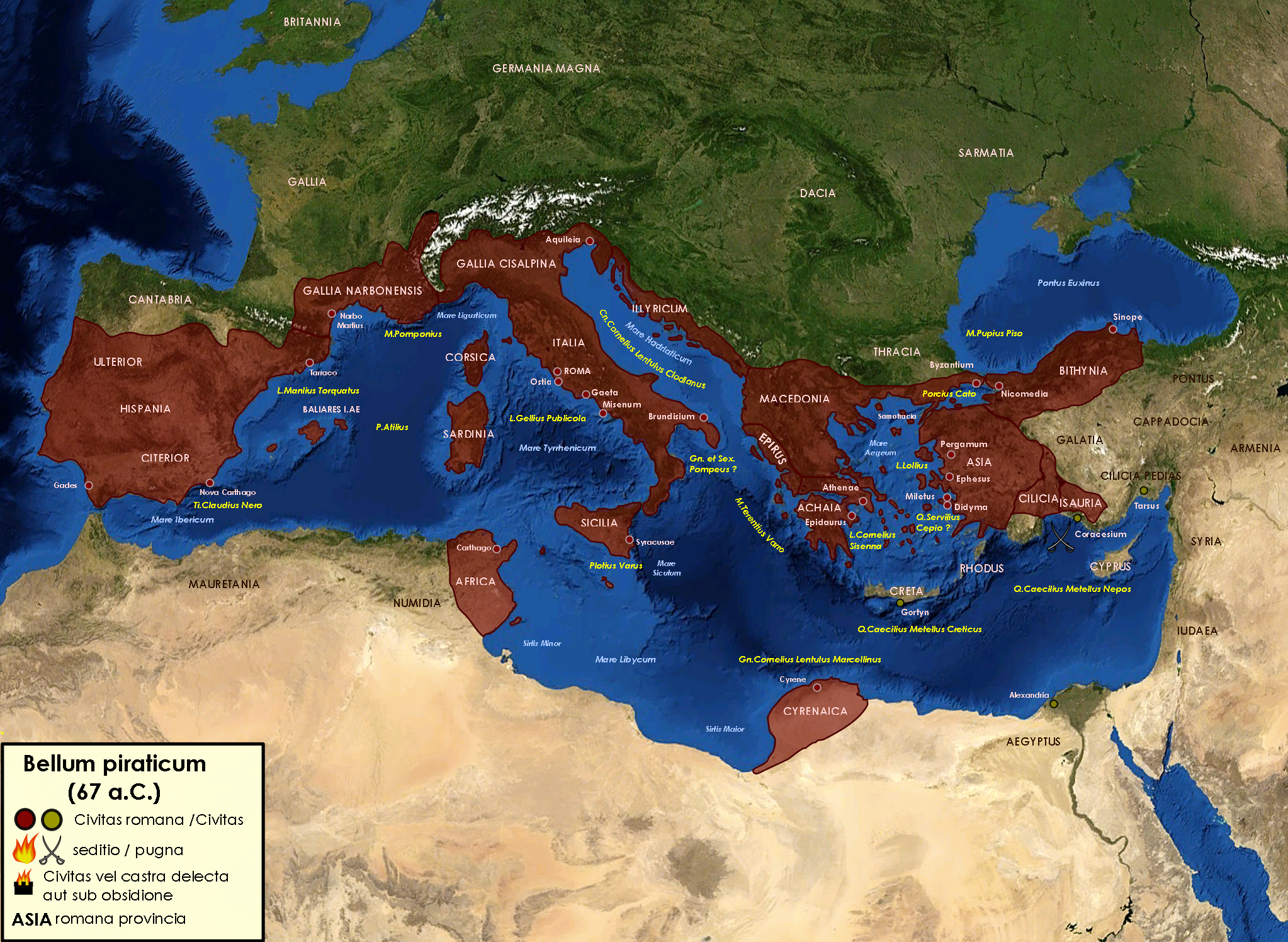
General map of the Bellum piraticum with its commanders, by territorial area

According to the provisions set forth by the Senate, the army that Pompey could assemble for deployment throughout the Mediterranean was initially expected to comprise 500 ships, 120,000 armed men (approximately equivalent to 30 legions), and 5,000 cavalry. These forces would be under the command of 24 praetors and 2 quaestors, with a total budget of 1,000 Attic talents. Historical accounts indicate that Pompey sought assistance from the fleet of the Rhodians as well. In practice, however, the forces available to Pompey amounted to no more than 270 ships (including hemiolias), 4,000 horsemen, and 120,000 infantry. These troops were commanded by either 14 legates, as reported by Florus, or 25, according to Appian. The legates and their assigned areas of command included:

1. Gellius (consul in 72 BC), in charge of the Tuscan Sea;
2. Gnaeus Cornelius Lentulus Clodianus in the upper Adriatic Sea, in whose employ may have been Pompey's young sons (Gnaeus Pompeius Magnus and Sextus Pompey) and not, as Florus would have it, the latter placed to guard the Egyptian Sea;
3. Plotius Varus on the Sea of Sicily;
4. Atilius in the Ligurian Sea (according to Florus) or the Sardinian-Corsica Sea (according to Appian);
5. Pomponius in Gallia Narbonensis;
6. Torquatus in the Balearic Sea;
7. Tiberius Nero in the Strait of Gades;
8. Lentulus Marcellinus on the Libyan-African Sea;
9. Terentius Varro on the lower Adriatic to Acarnania;
10. Lucius Sisenna on the Peloponnese, Attica, Euboea, Thessaly, Macedonia and Boeotia;
11. Lucius Lollius on the upper Aegean and its islands to the Hellespont;
12. Publius Piso over Pontus Euxinus in the seas of Thrace and Bithynia, north of the Propontis;
13. Metellus over the eastern Aegean, southern Ionia, Lycia, Pamphylia, Cyprus, and Phoenicia;
14. Cepion over the Asiatic Sea;
15. Cato the Younger was to close the Propontis passages.

=== Pirates ===
Plutarch reports that by the end of the First Mithridatic War, pirate ships had increased to over 1,000 and had sacked or occupied at least 400 cities. Below is how Appian describes them:

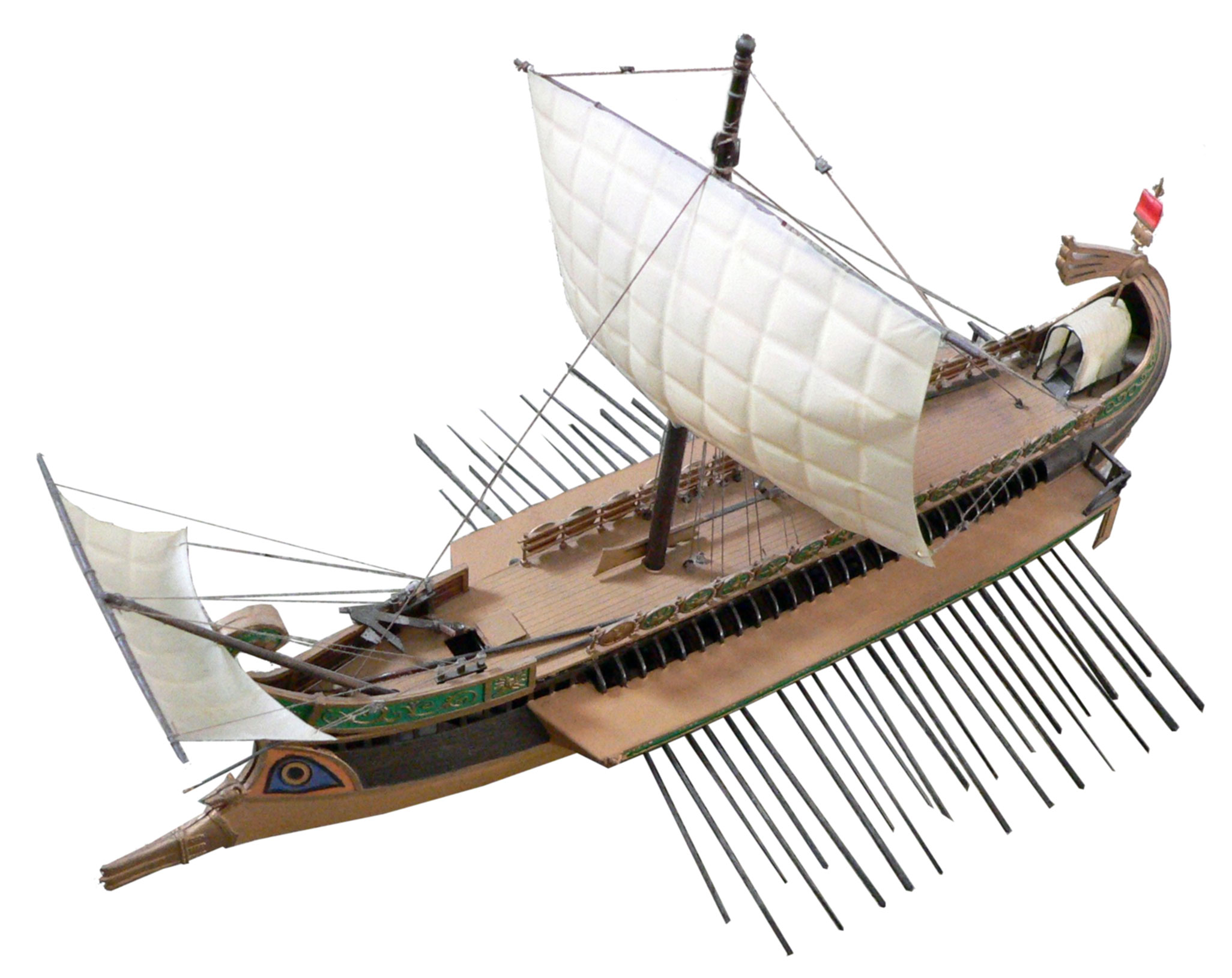
Model of a Roman trireme, also used by pirates.

In the beginning [the pirates] roamed around with a couple of small boats, worrying the inhabitants of the area as [they were] thieves. As the war went on, they became more and more numerous and built larger ships. Having big gains, they did not stop [engaging in piracy] when Mithridates was defeated and called for peace, and then withdrew [from the conquered territories]. Having lost both their livelihood and their country due to the war, having fallen into extreme misery, they used the sea instead of land-holding; at first using vessels such as the pinnaces and the hemiolias, then with biremi and triremi, which sailed in actual squads under pirate leaders who were like the generals of an army. They occupied an unfortified city. They tore down the walls of the others, captured after a regular siege, looting them. They then took the wealthiest citizens away to their hidden headquarters, holding them hostage and demanding their ransom. They scorned the appellation of thieves, describing their spoils as war prizes. They had chained artisans to do work for them, and continually bringing them materials of wood, brass and iron.

— Appian of Alexandria, Mithridatic Wars, 92.

Fueled by their easy successes, the pirates chose not to abandon their way of life after the war; instead, they began to see themselves as kings, tyrants, and formidable armies. They believed that their unity rendered them invincible and thus embarked on constructing ships and weapons to bolster their strength. The pirates established their headquarters at Cragus in Cilicia (modern-day Coracesium), which they selected as their main anchorage and encampment. They fortified their position with towers and built fortresses, claiming control over various islands throughout the Mediterranean. The rugged coastline of Cilicia, characterized by sheer cliffs and few safe mooring points, served as an ideal base for their operations. This geographical reality led to the collective label of "Cilicians" for the pirates, despite the fact that some hailed from regions such as Syria, Cyprus, Pamphylia, Pontus, and other eastern territories. Over time, their numbers swelled into the tens of thousands, spreading throughout the Mediterranean as far as the Pillars of Hercules.

== War ==
Pompey undertook the task of dividing the entire Mediterranean Basin into at least 15 districts, each assigned a specific number of ships and a designated commander. With his forces distributed across the various sectors surrounded by pirate fleets, he began his campaign by pursuing the enemy in the western regions. He successfully tracked down their headquarters and captured a significant number of their vessels, ultimately laying siege to the coast of Cilicia, in the East. For the operations against the pirates in Cilicia, Pompey chose to lead the charge personally with his 60 best ships. Initially, he focused on the western pirate strongholds, completely subduing them within just forty days. This successful campaign encompassed the Tyrrhenian Sea, Libyan Sea, Sea of Sardinia, Sea of Corsica, and the of Sicily, a feat accomplished through his relentless energy and the dedication of his lieutenants. After concluding these initial operations, Pompey made a brief stop in Rome before heading to Brindisi. He then turned his attention to the eastern pirate strongholds, which were significantly larger in terms of numbers, ships, and armaments, indicating a more formidable challenge ahead.

Some of the bands of pirates who were still free but asked for forgiveness were treated humanely [by Pompey], so much so that after their ships were seized and people handed over, no further harm was done to them; the others then had hope of being forgiven, tried to escape from the other commanders, and went to Pompey with their wives and children, surrendering to him. All these were spared, and through their help all those who were still free in their hiding places were tracked down, seized, and punished, as they knew they had committed unforgivable crimes.

— Plutarch, Life of Pompey, 27.4.

The most numerous and powerful bands of pirates had sought refuge with their families and treasures in fortified fortresses and citadels near the Taurus Mountains. They awaited Pompey's impending attack near the promontory of Coracesium in Cilicia (modern Alanya), where they initially faced defeat in battle before being besieged. Ultimately, the pirates opted to send ambassadors to the Roman proconsul, leading to their surrender along with the rebellious cities and islands under their control, which had often proven difficult to capture. The campaign against piracy concluded in less than three months, resulting in the surrender of all pirate ships—71 captured and 306 surrendered—some of which had brass bows. Over 20,000 pirates were taken prisoner, with an additional 10,000 killed during the conflict. Rather than executing the captured pirates, Pompey chose to detain them, recognizing that allowing them to go free could lead to the reformation of disorganized and belligerent bands, posing a significant threat for the future.

Reflecting, then, that by nature man is not and does not become a savage or asocial creature, but is transformed by the unnatural practice of vice; where he can be softened by new customs through the change of place and life, then, if even ferocious beasts can extinguish their ferocious and savage way of being when these live in a gentler way of life, [Pompey] decided to transfer the men from the sea to the land, allowing them to live in a gentler way of life, in cities and cultivating the land. Some of them, therefore, were welcomed and integrated into the small, semi-deserted cities of Cilicia, to which he added additional territories; after rebuilding the city of Soli, which had recently been devastated by Tigrane, king of Armenia, Pompey settled many of them there. For most of them, however, he gave as his residence the city of Dyme in Achaia, which was then devoid of men and had much good land.

— Plutarch, Life of Pompey, 28.3-4.

Pompey resettled some of the captured pirates in the cities of Mallus, Adana, and Epiphanea. Meanwhile, Metellus was engaged in eradicating piracy in Crete, a task he had undertaken before Pompey was assigned command of the anti-piracy campaign. Metellus was related to the Metellus who had previously served alongside Pompey in Hispania. Crete was considered a significant second base for piracy, following Cilicia in importance. Although Metellus had killed many pirates, he had yet to completely eliminate their presence. According to Plutarch, the surviving pirates under siege by Roman forces sent messages appealing to Pompey for assistance. Accepting their invitation, Pompey instructed Metellus to suspend the siege and dispatched one of his legates, Lucius Octavius, to engage with the pirates. Octavius entered three of the pirates' strongholds and fought alongside them, which resulted in Pompey appearing vulnerable and envious of Metellus’s accomplishments. However, Metellus did not yield to this rivalry. He ultimately succeeded in capturing and punishing the remaining pirates, even sending Octavius back after having insulted and beaten him in front of the army.

== Consequences ==
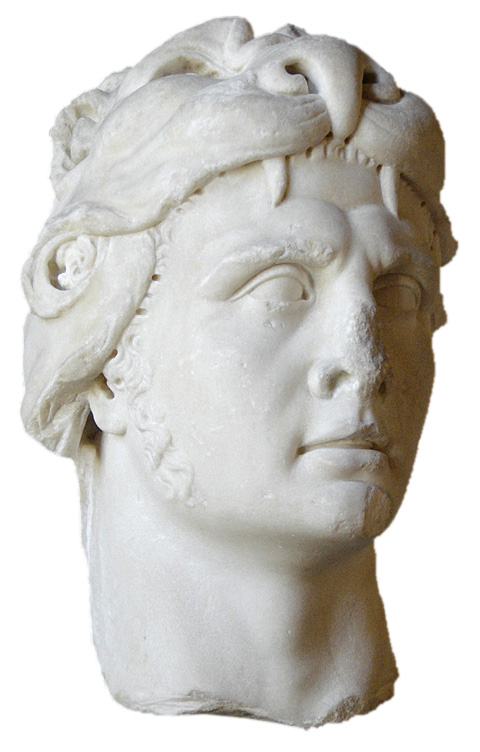
Mithridates depicted in a first-century Roman statue, now in the Louvre Museum.

Pompey's forces successfully purged the entire Mediterranean Basin of pirates, reclaiming key territories including the island of Crete, the coasts of Lycia, Pamphylia, and Cilicia. His military efforts reflected effective discipline and organizational skills, culminating in the control of Cilicia, which had been a center of piracy for over forty years. Following these actions, Tarsus was established as the capital of the newly formed Roman province, and Pompey oversaw the foundation of 39 new cities. The rapid pace of his campaign highlighted his talents as a naval general with strong logistical capabilities.

Subsequently, Pompey was commissioned to lead a new military campaign against Mithridates VI, king of Pontus, in the East. This command effectively tasked Pompey with the conquest and reorganization of the entire eastern Mediterranean, further solidifying his influence. Supported by Caesar, Pompey conducted his campaigns from 65 BC to 62 BC with remarkable military prowess and administrative efficiency, resulting in the annexation of much of Asia under firm Roman control.

In addition to defeating Mithridates, Pompey also vanquished Tigranes the Great, king of Armenia, with whom he negotiated treaties. He conquered Syria, then under the rule of Antiochus XIII, and swiftly advanced towards Jerusalem, which he occupied in a short period. Pompey implemented a comprehensive reorganization of the newly acquired eastern provinces, taking into account the geographical and political dynamics necessary for establishing a Roman frontier in the East. Through his campaigns, which included victories over Mithridates, Tigranes II, and Antiochus XIII) Pontus and Syria became Roman provinces, and Jerusalem was brought under Roman control.

== See also ==
- Pompey
- Cilician pirates
- Cilicia

== Bibliography ==
- Appian. Mithridatic Wars. Archived from the original on October 3, 2015.
- Cassius Dio. Roman history, XXXVI.
- Cicero. De Imperio Cn. Pompei ad Quirites oratio.
- Florus. Epitome of Roman History, I, 41.
- Livy. Periochae ab Urbe condita libri.
- Plutarch. Life of Pompey.
- Plutarch. Life of Caesar.
- Polyaenus. Stratagems.
- Strabo. The Geography, XII.
- Valerius Maximus. Factorum et dictorum memorabilium libri IX.
- Velleius Paterculus. Historiae Romanae ad M. Vinicium libri duo, II, 31-33.
- Antonelli, Giuseppe (1992). "Mitridate, il nemico mortale di Roma". Il Giornale - Biblioteca Storica (49). Milan.
- Brizzi, Giovanni (1997). Storia di Roma. 1. Dalle origini ad Azio. Bologna: Pàtron. ISBN 88-555-2419-4.
- Canfora, Luciano (1999). Giulio Cesare. Il dittatore democratico. Laterza. ISBN 88-420-5739-8.
- Crawford, M. H. (2008). "Origini e sviluppi del sistema provinciale romano". La Repubblica imperiale: l'Età della conquista, Storia Einaudi dei Greci e dei Romani. 14. Milan: Il Sole 24 Ore.
- Leach, John (1983). Pompeo, il rivale di Cesare. Milan: Rizzoli. ISBN 88-17-36361-8.
- Piganiol, André (1989). Le conquiste dei Romani. Milan: Il Saggiatore. ISBN 88-04-32321-3.
