= Philopator I =

Philopator I (Ancient Greek: Φιλοπάτωρ) was the Roman client king of Cilicia briefly in 31–30 BC.

He was a son of Tarcondimotus I who, like his father, at first sided with Mark Antony during the civil war between him and Octavian. After Octavian's victory in the Battle of Actium in 31 BC, and his father's death, he quickly changed sides, but Octavian nevertheless deposed him from his kingdom in 30 BC. In 20 BC, Cilicia was restored as a kingdom with a king called Tarcondimotus II. The identity of this Tarcondimotus is obscure, but Gilbert Dagron and Denis Feissel have suggested he is the same person as Philopator I; in which case he ruled until his death in 17 AD.
