= Anazarbus =

Former city in southern Turkey

- Anavarza (Turkish)
- Caesarea, Justinopolis
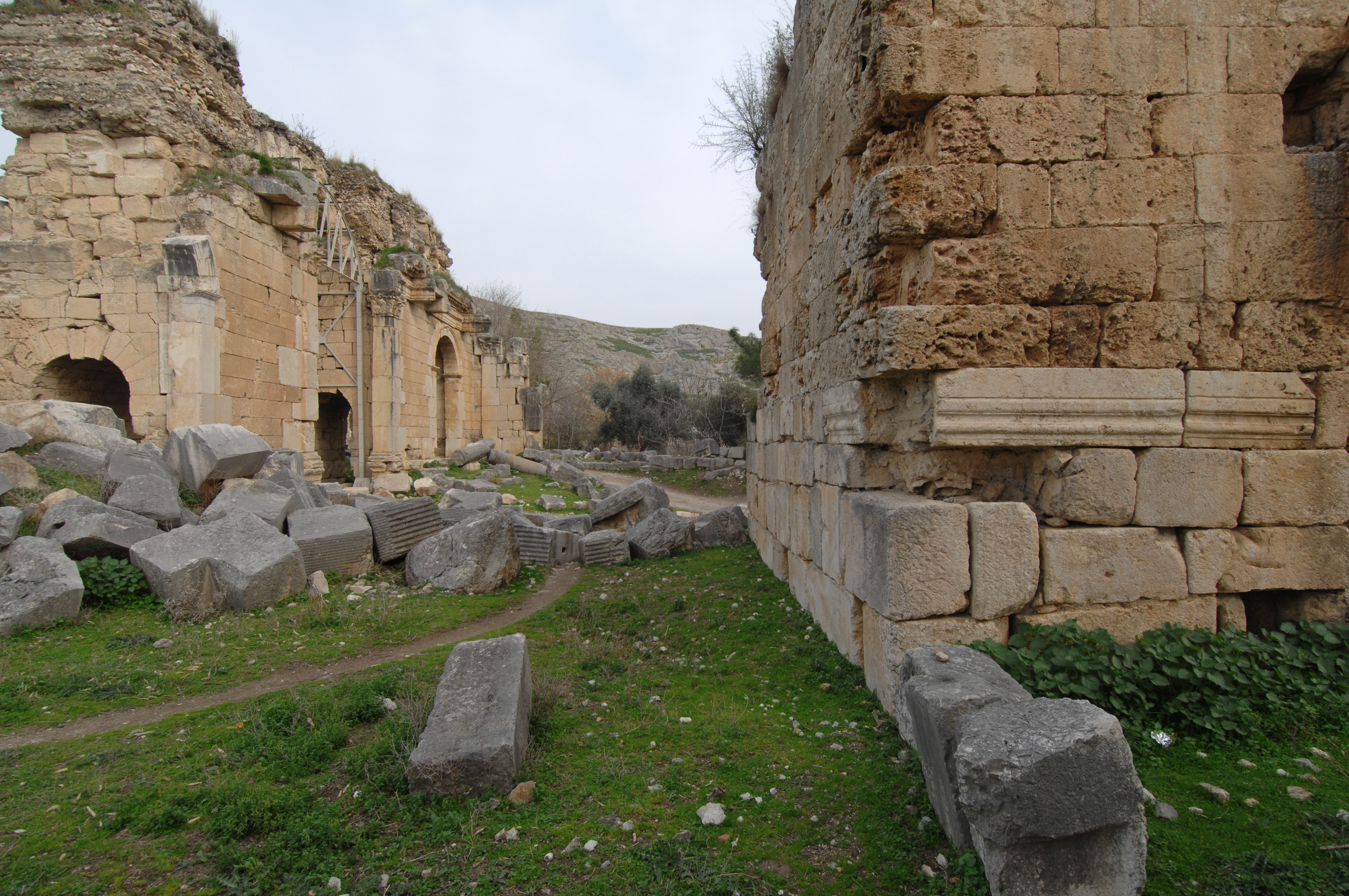
- The triumphal arch of Anazarbus was later converted to the city's South Gate.

- Location within Turkey
- 37°15′50″N 35°54′20″E
- Type: Settlement
- Location: Adana Province, Turkey
- Region: Cilicia

History
- Abandoned: 1374

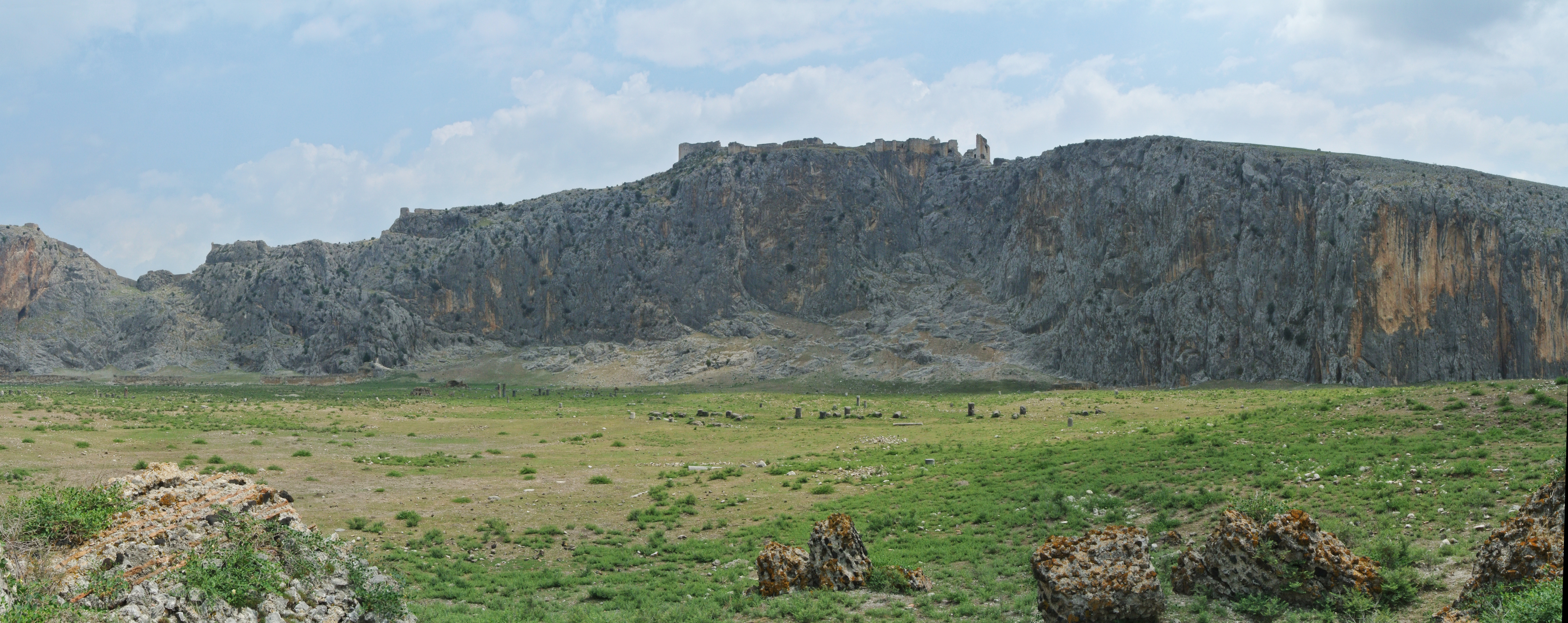
General view of the site

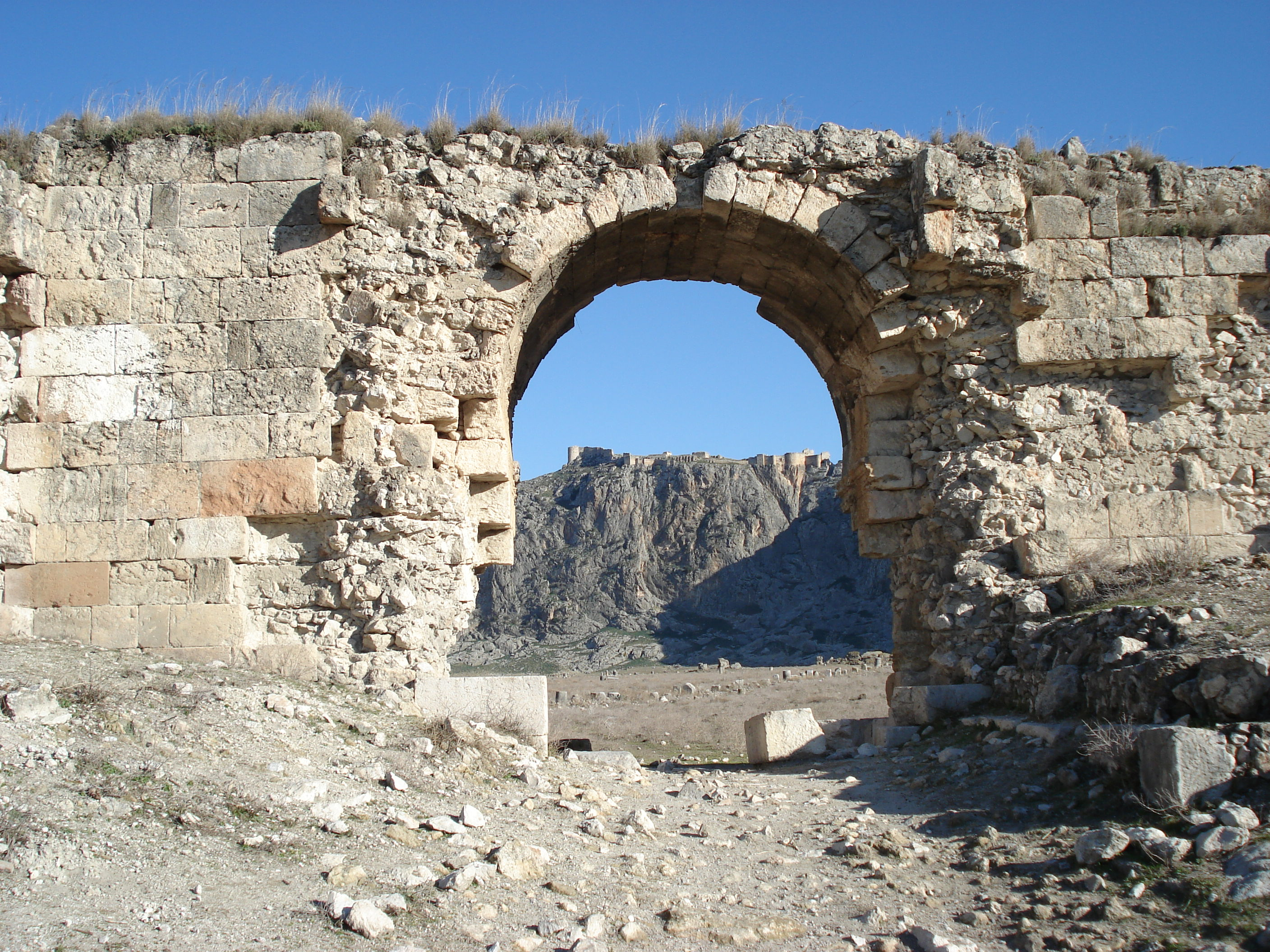
Anazarbus West Gate

Anazarbus, also known as Justinopolis (Ancient Greek: Ἀναζαρβός / Ἰουστινούπολις, medieval Ain Zarba; modern Anavarza; Arabic: عَيْنُ زَرْبَة), was an ancient Cilician city. Under the late Roman Empire, it was the capital of Cilicia Secunda. Roman emperor Justinian I rebuilt the city in 527 after a strong earthquake hit it. It was destroyed in 1374 by the forces of the Mamluk Empire, after their conquest of Cilician Armenia.

== Location ==
It was situated in Anatolia in modern Turkey, in the present Çukurova (or classical Aleian plain) about 15 km west of the main stream of the present Ceyhan River (or classical Pyramus river) and near its tributary the Sempas Su.

A lofty isolated ridge formed its acropolis. Though some of the masonry in the ruins is certainly pre-Roman, the Suda's identification of it with Cyinda, famous as a treasure city in the wars of Eumenes of Cardia, cannot be accepted in the face of Strabo's express location of Cyinda in western Cilicia.

== History ==
According to the Suda, the original name of the place was Cyinda or Kyinda or Quinda (Greek: Κύϊνδα); and that it was next called Diocaesarea (Διοκαισάρεια). A city in Cilicia called Kundu rebelled against the Assyrian king Esarhaddon in 7th century BC, but it's unclear if there is a connection. At least it's known a city called Anazarbus (Ἀνάζαρβος) and Anazarba (Ἀνάζαρβα) and Anazarbon (Ἀνάζαρβον), situated on the river Pyramus, existed in the first century BC and was a part of the small client-kingdom of Tarcondimotus I until it was annexed by Rome. How the city obtained the name is a matter of conjecture. According to Stephanus of Byzantium, after the city was destroyed by an earthquake, the emperor Nerva sent thither one Anazarbus, a man of senatorial rank, who rebuilt the city, and gave to it his name. This account cannot be accurate, as Valesius remarks, for it was called Anazarbus in Pliny's time. There are three writers of antiquity from this city. Pedanius Dioscorides is called a native of Anazarbus; but the period of Dioscorides is not certain. It was also the home of the poet Oppian and the historian Asclepiades of Anazarba. Its later name was Caesarea ad Anazarbum, and there are many medals of the place in which it is both named Anazarbus and Caesarea at or under Anazarbus. On the division of Cilicia it became the chief place of the Roman province of Cilicia Secunda, with the title of Metropolis. Early in the sixth century, in the reign of Eastern Roman emperor Justin I, it was named Justinopolis or Ioustinoupolis (Ἰουστινούπολις). The city suffered from an earthquake in 526 and was rebuilt by Justinian I and renamed Justinianopolis or Ioustinianoupolis (Ἰουστινιανούπολις); but the old name persisted, and when Thoros I, king of Lesser Armenia, made it his capital early in the 12th century, it was known as Anazarva.

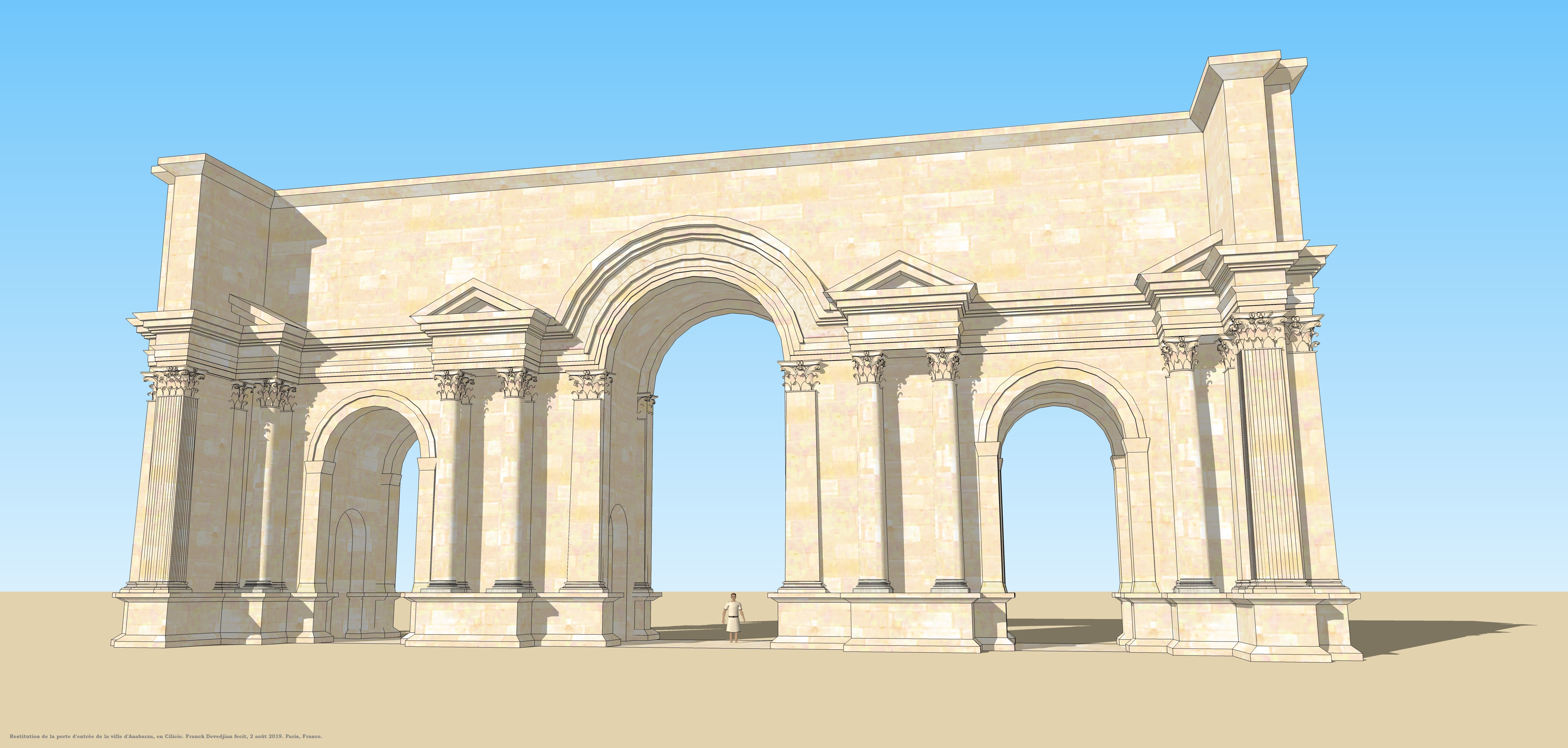
Digital reconstruction of the main gate of the city

Its great natural strength and situation, not far from the mouth of the Sis pass, and near the great road which debouched from the Cilician Gates, made Anazarbus play a considerable part in the struggles between the Eastern Roman Empire and the early Muslim invaders. It had been rebuilt by Harun al-Rashid in 796, refortified at great expense by the Hamdanid Sayf al-Dawla (mid-10th century) and again destroyed in 962 by Nikephoros II Phokas. In the 11th century it was again a major fortress, comparable to Tarsos and Marash, and belonged to the realm of Philaretos Brachamios before it was captured around 1084 by the Seljuk Turks. In late 1097 or early 1098 it was captured by the armies of the First Crusade and after the conquest of Antioch it was incorporated into Bohemond of Taranto's Principality of Antioch. The site briefly exchanged hands between the Byzantine Empire and Armenians, until it was formally part of the Armenian Kingdom of Cilicia. Anazarbus was one of a chain of Armenian fortifications stretching through Cilicia. The castle of Sis (modern Kozan, Adana) lies to the north while Tumlu Castle and Yilankale are to the south, and the fortresses of Amouda and Sarvandikar are to the east. The Mamluk Empire of Egypt finally destroyed the city in 1374.

== Remains ==
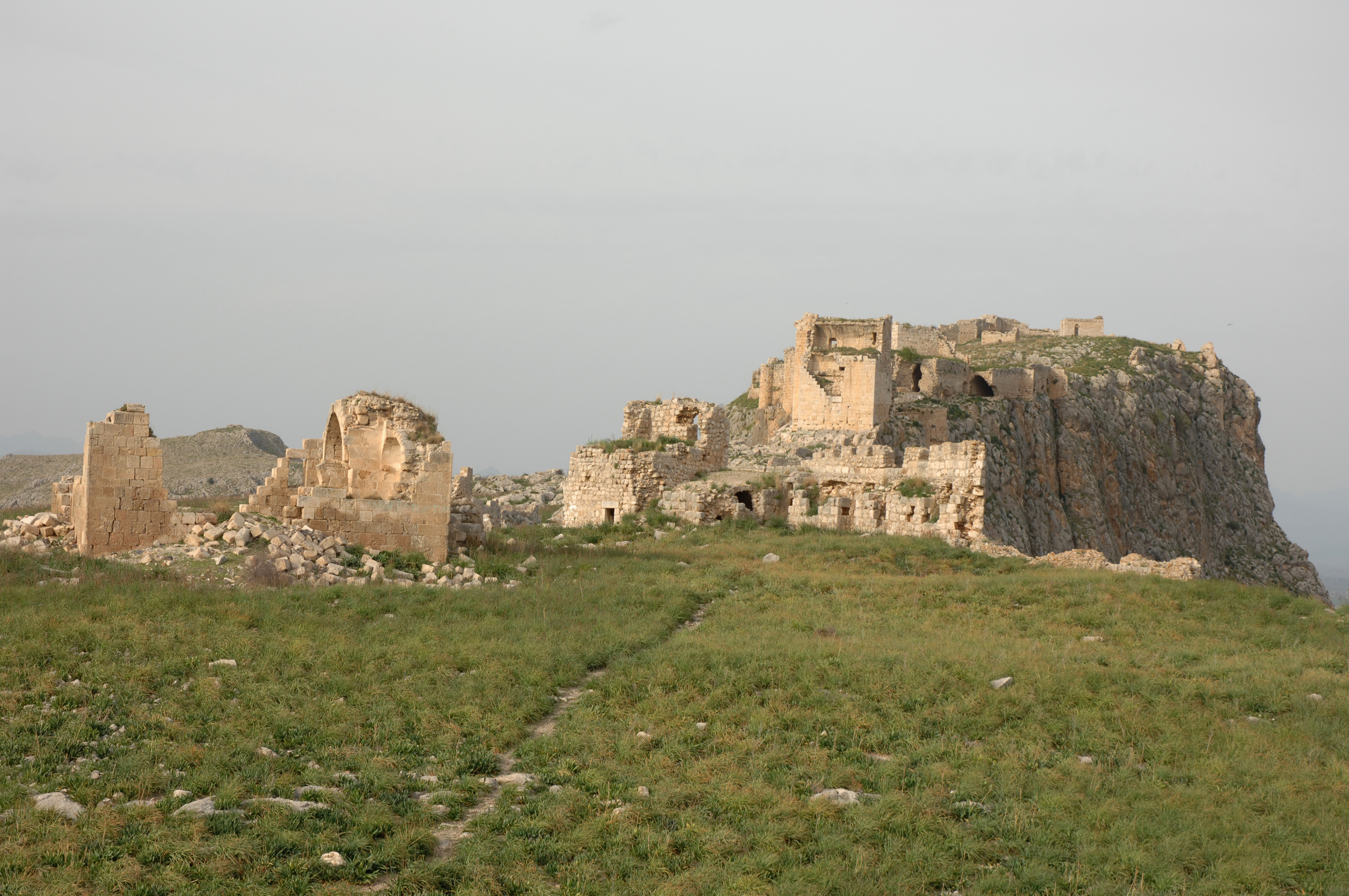
Anavarza's upper city

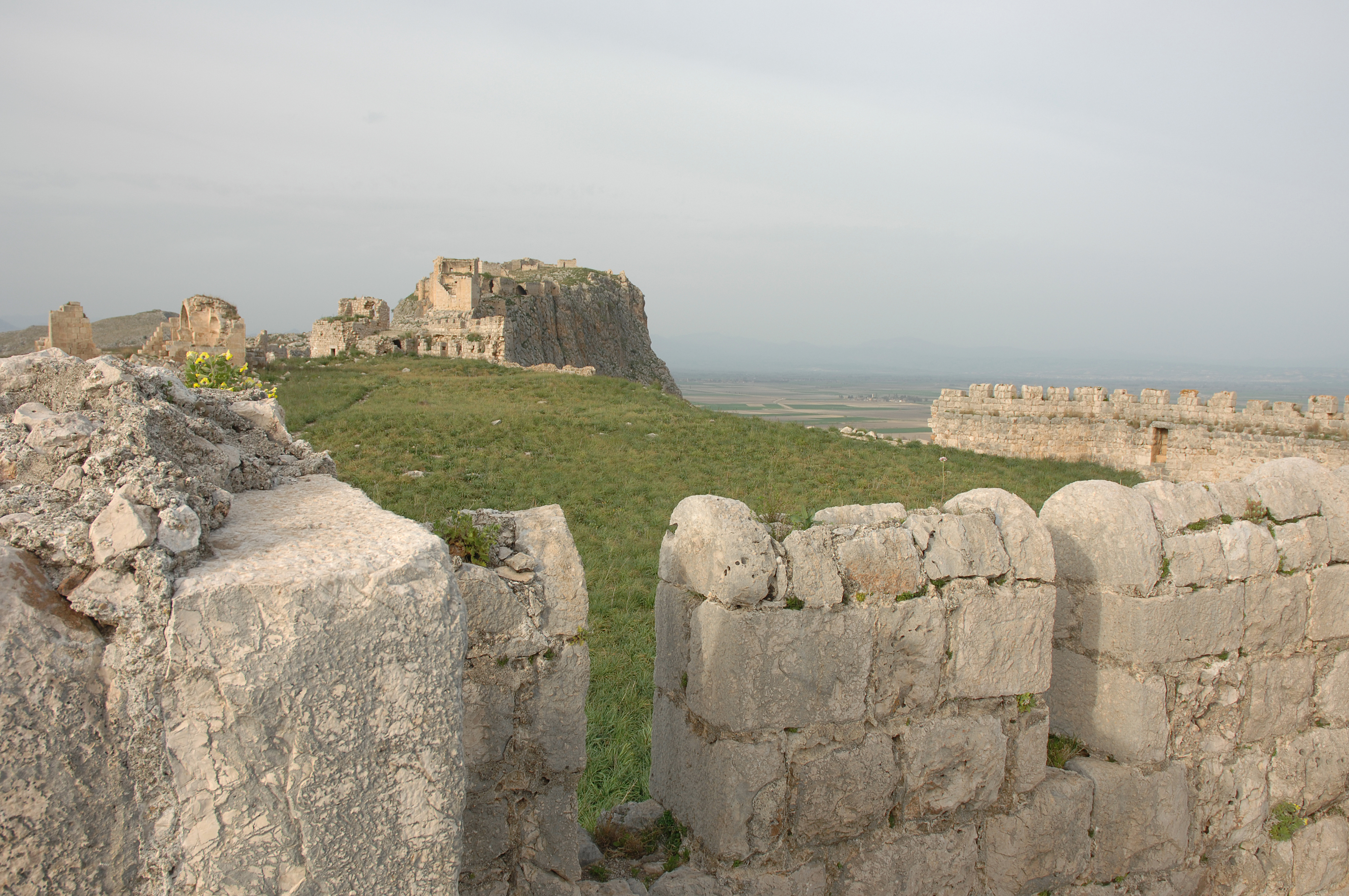
Anavarza's upper city

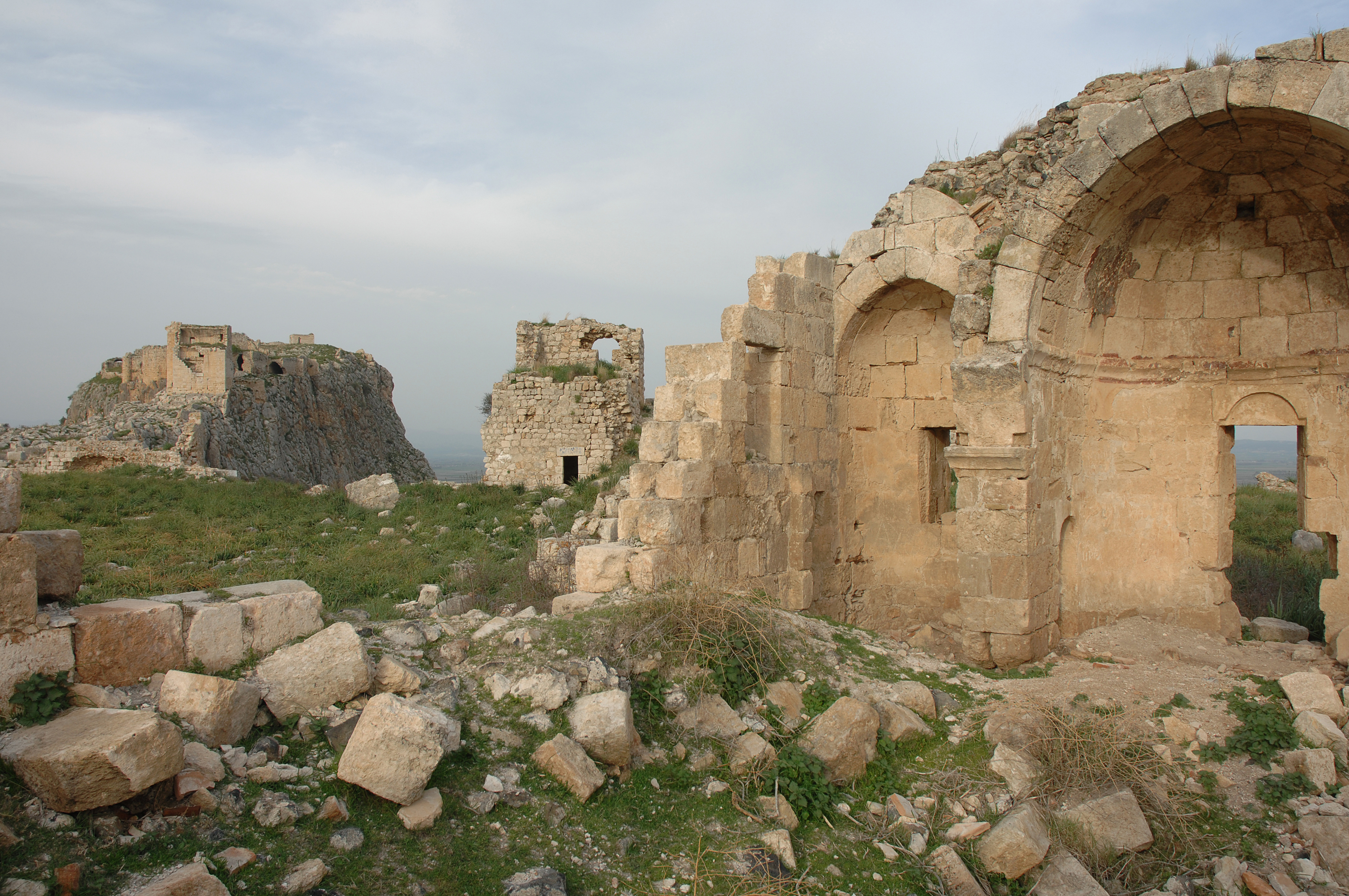
In the foreground: Some remains of the burial church of the Armenian kings, 12th century

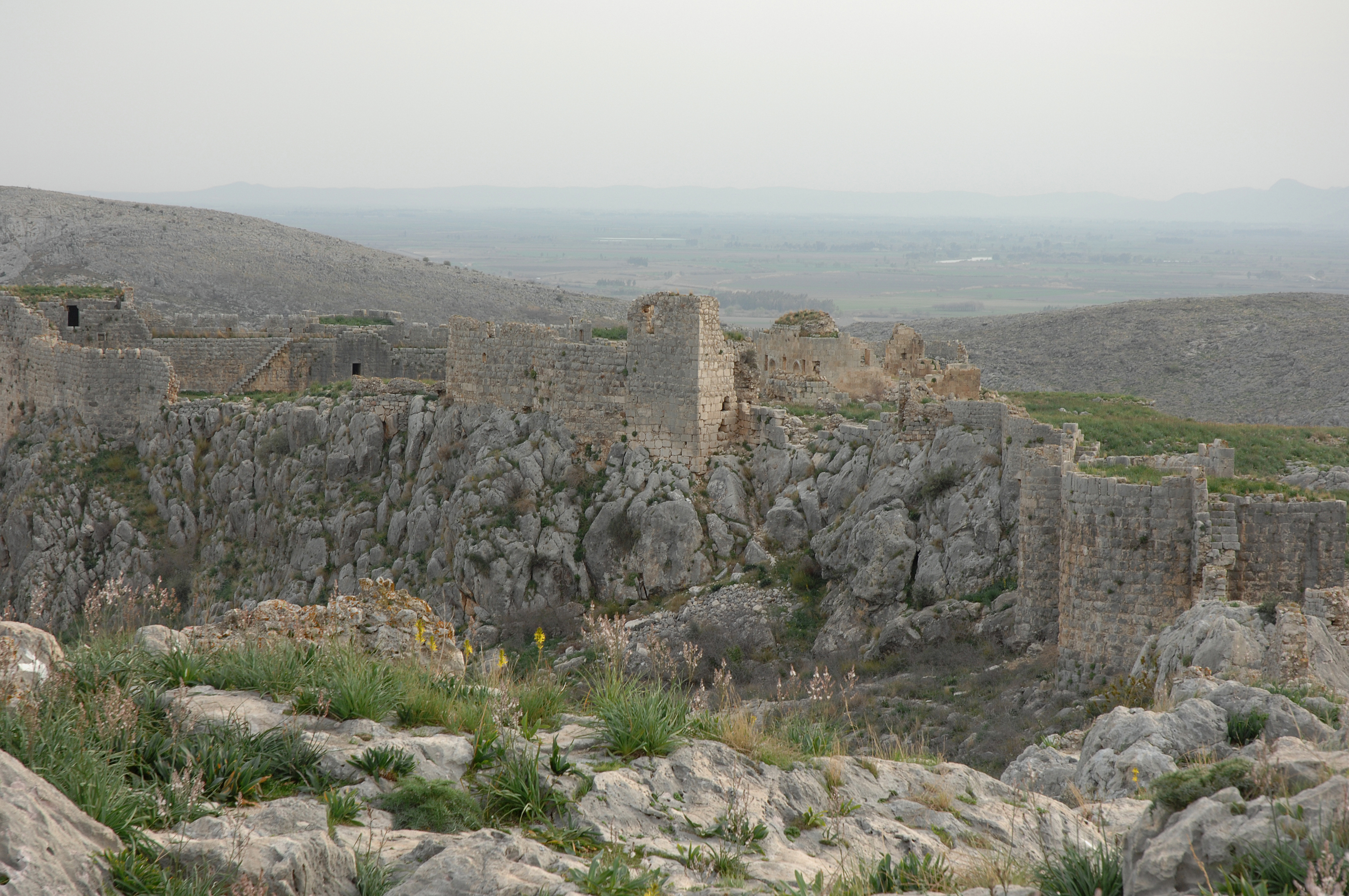
Anavarza's castle

The Crusaders are probably responsible for the construction of an impressive donjon atop the center of the outcrop. Most of the remaining fortifications, including the curtain walls, massive horseshoe-shaped towers, undercrofts, cisterns, and free-standing structures date from the Armenian periods of occupation, which began with the arrival of the Rubenid Baron T‛oros I, c. 1111. Within the fortress are two Armenian chapels and the magnificent (but severely damaged) three-aisle church built by T‛oros I to celebrate his conquests. The church was once surrounded by a continuous, well-executed dedicatory inscription in Armenian.

The present wall of the lower city is of late construction. It encloses a mass of ruins conspicuous in which are a fine triumphal arch, the colonnades of two streets, a gymnasium, etc. A stadium and a theatre lie outside the walls to the south. The remains of the acropolis fortifications are very interesting, including roads and ditches hewn in the rock. There are no notable structures in the upper town. For picturesqueness the site is not equaled in Cilicia, and it is worthwhile to trace the three fine aqueducts to their sources. A necropolis on the escarpment to the south of the curtain wall can also be seen complete with signs of illegal modern excavations.

A modest Turkish farming village (Dilekkaya) lies to the southwest of the ancient city. A small outdoor museum with some of the artifacts collected in the area can be viewed for a small fee. Also nearby are some beautiful mosaics discovered in a farmers field.

A visit in December 2002 showed that the three aqueducts mentioned above have been nearly completely destroyed. Only small, isolated sections are left standing with the largest portion lying in a pile of rubble that stretches the length of where the aqueducts once stood. A powerful earthquake that struck the area in 1945 is thought to be responsible for the destruction.

In 2013, excavations uncovered the first known colonnaded double-lane road of the ancient world, 34 meters wide and 2700 meters long, also uncovered the ruins of a church and a bathhouse.

In 2017, archaeologists discovered a limestone statue of the goddess Hygieia and the god Eros. The statue is thought to date to the third or fourth century B.C.

Notable Western recorders of the remains in the late 19th and early 20th centuries included the Rev. E.J. Davis in 1875; the English explorers Theodore and Mabel Bent, who visited in early 1890; and Gertrude Bell, arriving on 19 April 1905 and writing in her diary – “So at 6.30 we reached the great rock of Anavarza. It looked most wonderful in the sunset with its crown of towers and the double line of the city wall stretching out below it.” Bell has also left some spectacular early photographs.

== Ecclesiastical history ==
Anazarbus was the capital and so also from 553 (the date of the Second Council of Constantinople) the metropolitan see of the Late Roman province of Cilicia Secunda.

In the 4th century, one of the bishops of Anazarbus was Athanasius, a "consistent expounder of the theology of Arius." His theological opponent, Athanasius of Alexandria, in De Synodis 17, 1 refers to Anazarbus as Ναζαρβῶν.

Maximin of Anazarbus attended the Council of Chalcedon.

A 6th century Notitia Episcopatuum indicates that it had as suffragan sees Epiphania, Alexandria Minor, Irenopolis, Flavias, Castabala and Aegeae. Rhosus was also subject to Anazarbus, but after the 6th century was made exempt, and Mopsuestia was raised to the rank of autocephalous metropolitan see, though without suffragans.

=== Latin Catholic titular see ===
The titular archbishopric was revived in the 18th century as a see of the Latin Catholic church, Anazarbus.

It is vacant, having had the following incumbents, generally of the highest (Metropolitan) rank, with an episcopal (lowest rank) exception:

- Titular Archbishop Giuseppe Maria Saporiti (1726.04.08 – 1743.12.02)
- Titular Bishop Isidro Alfonso Cavanillas (1753.04.09 – 1755.05.12)
- Titular Archbishop Gerolamo Formagliari (1760.07.21 – 1781)
- Titular Archbishop Romain-Frédéric Gallard (1839.02.21 – 1839.09.28)
- Titular Archbishop Andon Bedros Hassoun (1842.06.07 – 1846.08.02), as Coadjutor Archeparch of Istanbul of the Armenians (Turkey) (1842.06.07 – 1846.08.02), succeeded as Archeparch of Istanbul of the Armenians (Turkey) (1846.08.02 – 1866.09.14), later Patriarch of Cilicia of the Armenians (Lebanon) ([1866.09.14] 1867.07.12 – 1881.06), created Cardinal-Priest of Ss. Vitale, Valeria, Gervasio e Protasio (1880.12.16 – 1884.02.28)
- Titular Archbishop Giorgio Labella, Friars Minor (O.F.M.) (1847.06.04 – 1860.10.27)
- Titular Archbishop Charles Petre Eyre (1868.12.03 – 1878.03.15)
- Titular Archbishop John Baptist Salpointe (1884.04.22 – 1885.08.18)
- Titular Archbishop Michael Logue (1887.04.19 – 1887.12.03) (later Cardinal)*
- Titular Archbishop François Laurencin (1888.06.01 – 1892.12.18)
- Titular Archbishop Joaquín Larraín Gandarillas (1893.06.15 – 1897.09.26)
- Titular Archbishop Raimondo Ingheo (1907.12.16 – 1911.07.08)
- Titular Archbishop Cláudio José Gonçalves Ponce de Leon, Lazarists (C.M.) (1912.01.09 – 1924.05.26)
- Titular Archbishop Raymund Netzhammer, Benedictine Order(] O.S.B.) (1924.07.14 – 1945.09.18)
- Titular Archbishop Michele Akras (1945.10.27 – 1947.02.05)
- Titular Archbishop Heinrich Döring (ハインリヒ・デーリング), S.J. (1948.01.15 – 1951.12.17)
- Titular Archbishop Joseph-Marie Le Gouaze (1955.06.24 – 1964.07.31)

=== Armenian Catholic titular see ===
In the 19th century, an Armenian Catholic titular bishopric of Anazarbus (of the Armenians) (Anazarbus degli Armeni in Curiate Italian) was established.

It was a suppressed in 1933, having had a single incumbent, of the intermediary (archiepiscopal) rank :

- Titular Archbishop Avedis Petros XIV Arpiarian (1898.04.05 – 1911.08.27), previously Eparch of Kharput of the Armenians (1890.09.23 – 1898.04.05); later Eparch of Marasc of the Armenians (1911.08.27 – 1928.06.29), Auxiliary Eparch of the patriarchate Cilicia of the Armenians (Lebanon) (1928.06.29 – 1931.10.17), Armenian Catholic Patriarch of Cilicia (Lebanon) ([1931.10.17] 1933.03.13 – 1937.10.26)

== Notable locals ==
- Pedanius Dioscorides (1st century) Greek physician, pharmacologist and botanist
- St. Domnina of Anazarbus
- St. Theodula of Anazarbus

== See also ==
- Diocese of Alexandretta
