= Philopator II =

Cilician king

Philopator II (Ancient Greek: Φιλοπάτωρ) was a Cilician king who died in 17 AD. His death induced a commotion amongst his realm. This prompted the Roman emperor Tiberius to send his heir Germanicus to the Eastern provinces with the putative aim of quelling the disturbances that existed in the region.
