= War of Mutina =

44–43 BC Roman civil war in Italy

- Part of the crisis of the Roman Republic
Date	December 44 – April 43 BC
Location	Cisalpine Gaul and northern Italy
Result	Senate and Octavian defeat Antony; Octavian gains control of the armies of Hirtius and Pansa and turns on the Senate; Octavian marches on Rome

Belligerents
Mark Antony	Roman Republic; Roman Senate	Octavian

Commanders and leaders
Mark Antony; Lepidus	C. Pansa †; A. Hirtius †; D. Brutus; Cicero	Octavian; Q. Pedius

Strength
11 legions: 4 legions (Antony); 7 legions (Lepidus)	23 legions: 10 legions (D. Brutus); 13 legions (Pollio, Plancus, et al)	11 legions

The War of Mutina (December 44 – April 43 BC; also called the Mutina war) was a civil war between the Roman Senate and Mark Antony in Northern Italy. It was the first civil war after the assassination of Julius Caesar. The main issue of the war was attempts by the Senate to resist Antony's forceful assumption of the strategically important provinces of Transalpine and Cisalpine Gaul from their governors. The Senate, led by Cicero and the consuls (Aulus Hirtius and Gaius Vibius Pansa), attempted to convince Julius Caesar's heir (today known in this period as Octavian, later the future emperor Augustus) to fight against Antony. Octavian, however, would pursue his own agenda.

The consuls, with Octavian, led troops into northern Italy against Antony and won two battles at Forum Gallorum and Mutina (14 and 21 April 43 BC). After the two consuls were mortally wounded at those battles, there emerged a political vacuum. Octavian – with the support of his men – demanded the consulship from the Senate and marched on Rome. After taking control of the city, Octavian and one of his kinsmen, Quintus Pedius, were irregularly elected consuls. They forced through legislation which had the effect of outlawing Julius Caesar's killers before starting negotiations with Antony. The negotiations resulted in the two men reconciling. With Lepidus, they then formed the Second Triumvirate.

== Background ==
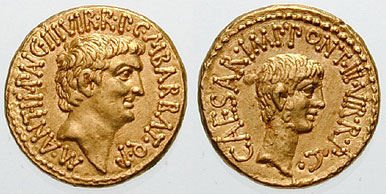
Aurei depicting Mark Antony and Octavian, minted 41 BC, after the events of the war and during the triumviral period.

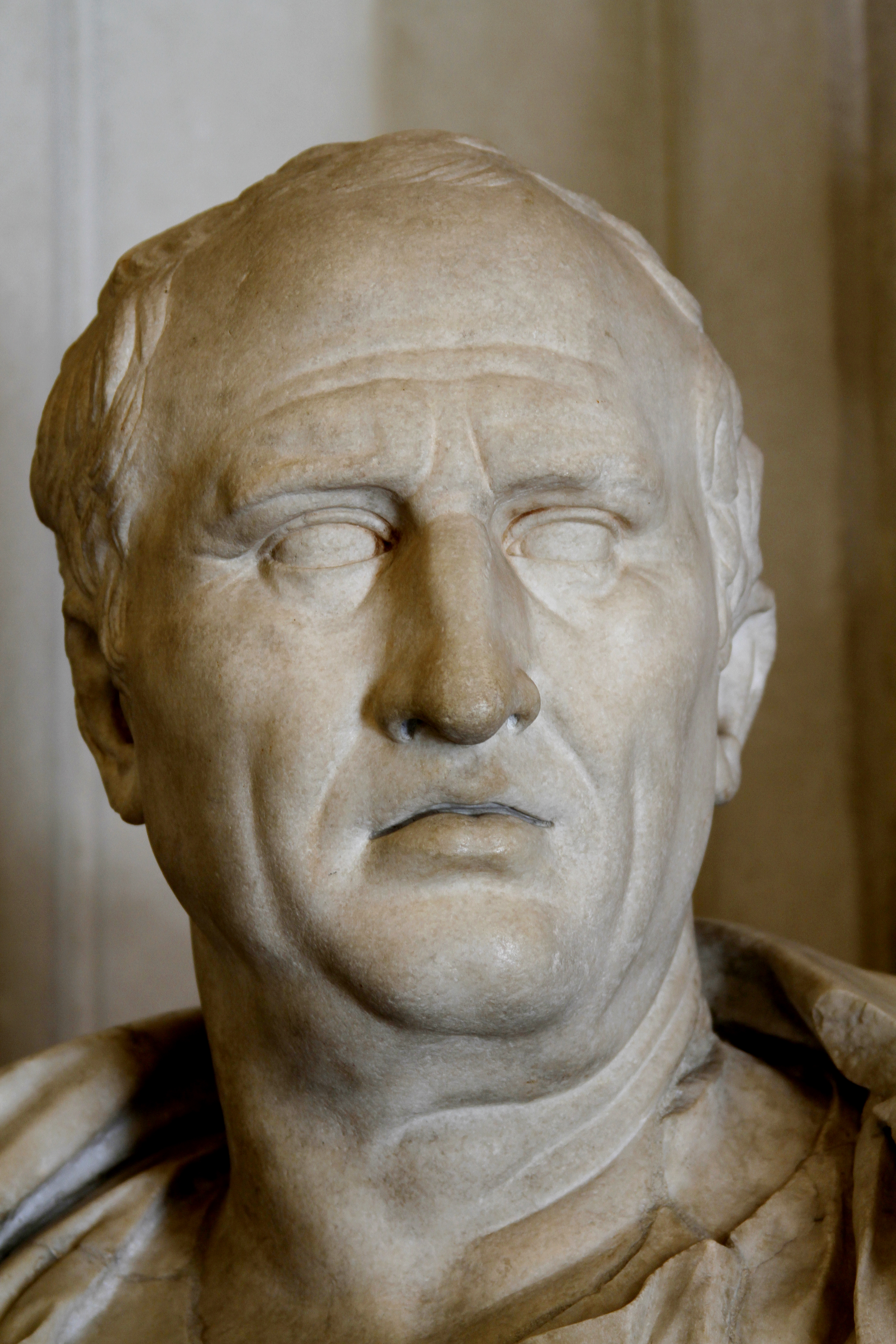
1st century AD bust of Cicero.

A group of senators, calling themselves the liberatores and led by Marcus Junius Brutus, assassinated Julius Caesar on 15 March 44 BC at a meeting of the Senate. Among the conspirators were many aristocrats who had supported Caesar during the last civil war. The killers were driven largely by a belief that Caesar's perpetual dictatorship was undermining the republic.

In the immediate aftermath of Caesar's death, an uneasy truce emerged in Rome. The liberatores and the Caesarians in government – led by consul Mark Antony, magister equitum Marcus Aemilius Lepidus, and consul-designate Aulus Hirtius – reached an agreement to offer amnesty for Caesar's death and ratify the dead dictator's acta. A public funeral was also scheduled; during and after the funeral, Antony whipped up the urban plebs into hysterical mourning for Caesar, which also had the intended effect of shifting public opinion against the tyrannicides.

In mid-April, public opinion forced Marcus Junius Brutus and Gaius Cassius Longinus, the lead tyrannicides and both praetors that year, to flee Rome. Antony secured for himself a number of allies. He arranged for Lepidus' irregular appointment as pontifex maximus and formed with him a marriage alliance. He also supported Publius Cornelius Dolabella's assumption of a suffect consulship and assigned him to the province of Syria. Also in April, Caesar's young heir Octavian arrived at Rome from Illyricum; he loitered in Italy, building support among Caesar's veterans, before he accepted his inheritance in May.

Octavian's arrival was met hostilely by Antony. Tension between the two quickly developed. Octavian petitioned for Antony to disburse Caesar's inheritance so that he could fulfil the terms of Caesar's will, which involved distributing 300 sesterces a man to the plebs; Antony delayed, probably on grounds that time was needed to divide Caesar's personal property from properties that belonged to the state. Octavian moved to sell his own property to raise money and fulfil the terms, gaining substantial popularity among the plebs. Writing in the Cambridge Ancient History, Elizabeth Rawson explains:

The policies of the actors in these events are difficult to assess. Antony has been seen as a genuine moderate, who intended to keep to the compromise of the Liberalia, but was driven into extreme and violent courses, either because young Caesar [Octavian]... rapidly threatened to filch the support of those most loyal to Caesar, including the plebs (perhaps chiefly the really poor) and to a large extent the veterans; or because, though Brutus was sincere in wishing the acta of Caesar to stand, many Republicans, including Cicero, were outraged at the sight of Caesarian partisans enjoying the property of Pompeians, and – very shortsightedly – anxious to go back on the agreement.

Antony then toured Italy, ostensibly to settle veterans, but actually to drum up military support; at the same time, Octavian and Brutus sponsored games to build urban support to their causes. On 2 June 44 BC, Antony forced through an illegal bill reassigning provinces. The bill was "trebly irregular because it was not a dies comitialis, due notice had not been given, and violence was used". According to Appian, the plebeian tribunes were bribed not to exercise their vetos. It moved Antony from his prospective province of Macedonia to Trans- and Cisalpine Gauls for a term of five years. It cemented Dolabella's position in Syria also for five years. He then snubbed Brutus and Cassius by assigning them to the duty of purchasing grain in Asia and Sicily.

== Course of the war ==
=== Political developments ===
Starting in September 44 BC, Cicero started to deliver a series of speeches against Antony, called the Philippics (in honour of Demosthenes' denunciations of Philip II of Macedon). The whole exchange apparently emerged from Antony's anger over Cicero's failure to attend a Senate meeting at which honours for Caesar were voted upon; after Antony inveighed against Cicero, he responded with the First Philippic, criticising Antony "with comparative moderation"; this provoked a further response from Antony, forcing Cicero to withdraw from the city to his villa in Campania. Around the same time, Antony started also to inveigh against the liberatores, accusing them of parricide and treason. Late in the year, Antony presided over the assignment of praetorian provinces, putting his brother Gaius in the strategically-important Macedonia. Brutus and Cassius were assigned to Crete and Cyrene respectively but Brutus, with the support of Macedonia's then-current governor, moved to seize the province in advance of Gaius Antonius' arrival.

Antony's attempts to champion Caesar's memory were regularly outflanked by Octavian. Through the summer, he also lost support among the Caesarian ex-consuls in the Senate. By November 44 BC, there were rumours that Octavian was planning to have Antony killed; Antony had left the city with an army to seize Cisalpine Gaul from its governor – Decimus Junius Brutus Albinus, one of the tyrannicides, – by force; and Octavian was raising a private army in southern Italy out of forces which Antony had transferred from Macedonia. Octavian and Cicero formed an alliance by the end of the year: Octavian's private army would be needed to fight Antony; Octavian needed Cicero to support him in the Senate.

On 20 December, a dispatch arrived in Rome from Decimus Brutus announcing his intention to defend his province from Antony and that Antony had put him to siege in Mutina (modern Modena). Cicero seized on the opportunity to deliver the Third Philippic against Antony, presenting Antony as a national enemy and praising Octavian and Decimus for their efforts opposing him; he then proposed, and received from the Senate, ratification of Decimus' position in Cisalpine Gaul, public thanks to Octavian for his private army and opposition to Antony, and reversal of Antony's provincial allotments. Cicero was unable to secure Antony's declaration as a public enemy, but he nevertheless proclaimed that he had "laid the basis for a res publica".

Days later, on 1 January, new consuls were inaugurated: Gaius Vibius Pansa Caetronianus and Aulus Hirtius. Pansa started a debate in the Senate forthwith. Octavian's then-private command was legitimised with imperium pro praetore; he was also inducted into the Senate with consular status and granted the right to stand for the consulship a decade early. Decimus Brutus was also officially thanked by the Senate for standing up to Antony and not abandoning his province. Cicero requested a senatus consultum ultimum against Antony but the motion was rejected. Beyond Cicero, there also was the influential pro-Antonian consular Quintus Fufius Calenus; a close friend of Antony's, he attempted through the beginning of the year to urge for peace with Antony as long as possible. At Calenus' urging, the Senate voted to send an embassy to Antony consisting of the ex-consuls Servius Sulpicius Rufus, Lucius Marcius Philippus (Octavian's step-father), and Lucius Calpurnius Piso. Cicero gave a further speech, the Seventh Philippic, which must have changed some minds, for soon afterwards, levies were undertaken; the consul Hirtius was voted command of the republic's forces.

Map of the movements of the various armies during the campaigns leading up to the Battle of Mutina.

The embassy returned on 1 February 43 BC. Antony's counterproposals were rejected. At this point, Lucius Julius Caesar moved the declaration of a tumultus to formalise the levying of troops. This was passed over Cicero's motion for a declaration noting a state of war. A senatus consultum ultimum may have been declared against Antony (as reported by Dio). Regardless, the republic's armies marched north to relieve Decimus Brutus from the siege at Mutina. On 20 March, entreaties from Lepidus (in Narbonensis) and Plancus (in Transalpine Gaul) to avoid a war were rejected: Cicero, delivering the Thirteenth Philippic, inveighed against Antony as a brigand and warned the Senate of the dangers of an Antonian victory. The Senate also called Plancus to join the relief armies at Mutina but he dithered, blaming his troops.

=== Battles ===
The northward march of Hirtius and Pansa's armies was the height of the crisis. Cicero wrote to Lucius Munatius Plancus on 30 March 43 BC that he expected "all the fortunes of the republic" would be decided in a single battle that would soon occur. An abortive attempt by Calenus and Piso to send peace envoys again failed after Cicero, having been nominated as an envoy, refused to treat with Antony. Pansa left the city at the head of four legions of recruits, leaving the city in command of Marcus Caecilius Cornutus and a single legion.

==== Forum Gallorum (14 April) ====
Hearing of Pansa's approach, Antony sent two legions away from his siege of Mutina to ambush the consul's army, but Hirtius and Octavian anticipated this, and sent the Martian legion and a praetorian cohort to Pansa's aid, triggering two battles near Forum Gallorum on 14 April. Antony's veterans still won the upper hand, inflicting heavy casualties on the reinforcements, while Pansa, who was mortally wounded in the fighting, retreated with his recruits to Bononia. On the return trip, however, Antony's tired troops were intercepted and routed by twenty-two cohorts of veterans under Hirtius. Octavian, meanwhile, was in charge of defending the army's camp and did so resolutely. In the aftermath, Hirtius, Pansa, and Octavian were all hailed imperator by their troops.

News of Pansa's defeat reached Rome first, triggering fears of Cicero planning a coup. After news of Hirtius' victory arrived on 20 April, Cicero was paraded from his house to the capitol and the Senate voted supplicationes for fifty days. Cicero then pushed for and received from the Senate honours for the two consuls, Octavian, and their soldiers.

==== Mutina (21 April) ====
Seven days after Forum Gallorum, on 21 April, Hirtius, Octavian, and Decimus Brutus fought Antony's army near Mutina. Decimus may have sallied forth from the city to assist the consular army. Hirtius and Octavian's armies successfully captured Antony's camp; Hirtius, however, was killed in heavy fighting. Antony, defeated, retreated in an attempt to join with Lepidus in Narbonensis.

== Political reconfiguration ==
=== After the consuls' deaths ===
After news of the victories at Forum Gallorum and Mutina reached Rome, a decree was passed declaring Antony a public enemy (hostis). News of the deaths of both consuls reached Rome, probably on 25 April, leading to a power vacuum at the top of government. The Senate, aware that the campaign could still be lost if Antony joined with Lepidus and Plancus on the far side of the Alps, was troubled when news arrived that Octavian allowed Antony to join with three legions of reinforcements by inaction. Further troubles emerged when Decimus – now voted overall command of the war – reported he was not in control of his army and that Octavian refused to follow orders. The lack of living consuls and the need to hold elections for the suffect consulship caused political paralysis in the middle of the republican war effort, which doomed Cicero's war plans. His coalition with Hirtius and Pansa, which had successfully reconciled moderate Caesarians and the liberatores, fell apart in political infighting.

Antony's army joined with Lepidus' army shortly after Decimus was unable to intercept it. On 30 May, Lepidus sent a letter claiming that his army had mutinied from his command and joined Antony's forces; he called for the Senate to make peace. Decimus Brutus in Gaul recommended to Cicero in a letter on 3 June that the legions from Africa and Sardinia be recalled to Italy along with Marcus Brutus' forces in Macedonia. Octavian's loyalty to the Senate also was in serious doubt; Appian reports that after Mutina, he opened communications with Antony and Lepidus, seeking to join with them to suppress the "Pompeians". Octavian, apparently hearing rumours that Cicero was intending to side-line him, also refused to send Pansa's former legion to Decimus Brutus.

Legions under Octavian then declared in early June that they refused to serve under Decimus Brutus. This took everyone at Rome by surprise. While Plancus' forces had joined with Decimus' forces in Gaul against Antony and Lepidus' combined armies, the two armies were locked in a stalemate: Plancus wrote to Cicero on 28 July – in the last letter preserved – that he would attack if he were reinforced by Octavian's forces or legions from Africa. Worryingly, he also reported that Octavian was refusing to come to his aid.

=== March on Rome ===
The Senate, distrusting Octavian, attempted to suborn his troops. This failed. Octavian then roused his army against the Senate in Rome. While the Senate attempted to appease him by giving Octavian command of the war on Antony and granting him more honours, this also failed. Octavian's soldiers demanded for him the consulship. When the Senate refused, he marched on Rome. Cornutus, in command of some legions from Africa and one legion of recruits, attempted to make a stand against Octavian's forces. The Senate moved a senatus consultum ultimum against Octavian, but when Octavian's forces arrived, the garrison at Rome simply defected. Cornutus committed suicide and Octavian encamped outside the city. The Senate, intimidated by his forces, finally offered him the consulship and ten thousand sesterces to each of his men.

Because an interrex could not be appointed if there were any patrician magistrates, two men were irregularly appointed pro consulibus to hold consular elections. The following elections returned Octavian (aged 19) and one of his relatives, Quintus Pedius; they took office on 19 Sextilis (later renamed August) 43 BC. Octavian had his adoption by Caesar ratified; Pedius had legislation enacted (the lex Pedia) establishing a court to try Caesar's killers. After a single day trial, the liberatores as a lot were condemned and outlawed in absentia. They then lifted the declaration of Lepidus and Antony as public enemies.

Under Lepidus' auspices, Octavian and Antony met at Bononia to form a compromise. The two, with Lepidus, then agreed to form a commission of three men with powers rei publicae constituendae; Octavian and Antony would go to war against Caesar's killers. This commission, known today as the Second Triumvirate, would be ratified by the lex Titia. The alliance would be further consummated by Octavian's marriage to Antony's step-daughter. Within the year, the triumvirs started a series of proscriptions where prominent wealthy men and political enemies were marked for death: among them were Decimus Brutus and Cicero. Decimus Brutus was executed in Gaul during an attempt to flee to Marcus Brutus in Macedonia. Cicero was executed at his villa in Caieta on 7 December.

== Cultural depictions ==
The war on Antony is depicted in the first half of the second season of the HBO–BBC series Rome.
