= Philippicae =

Speeches by Cicero condemning Mark Antony (44–43 BCE)

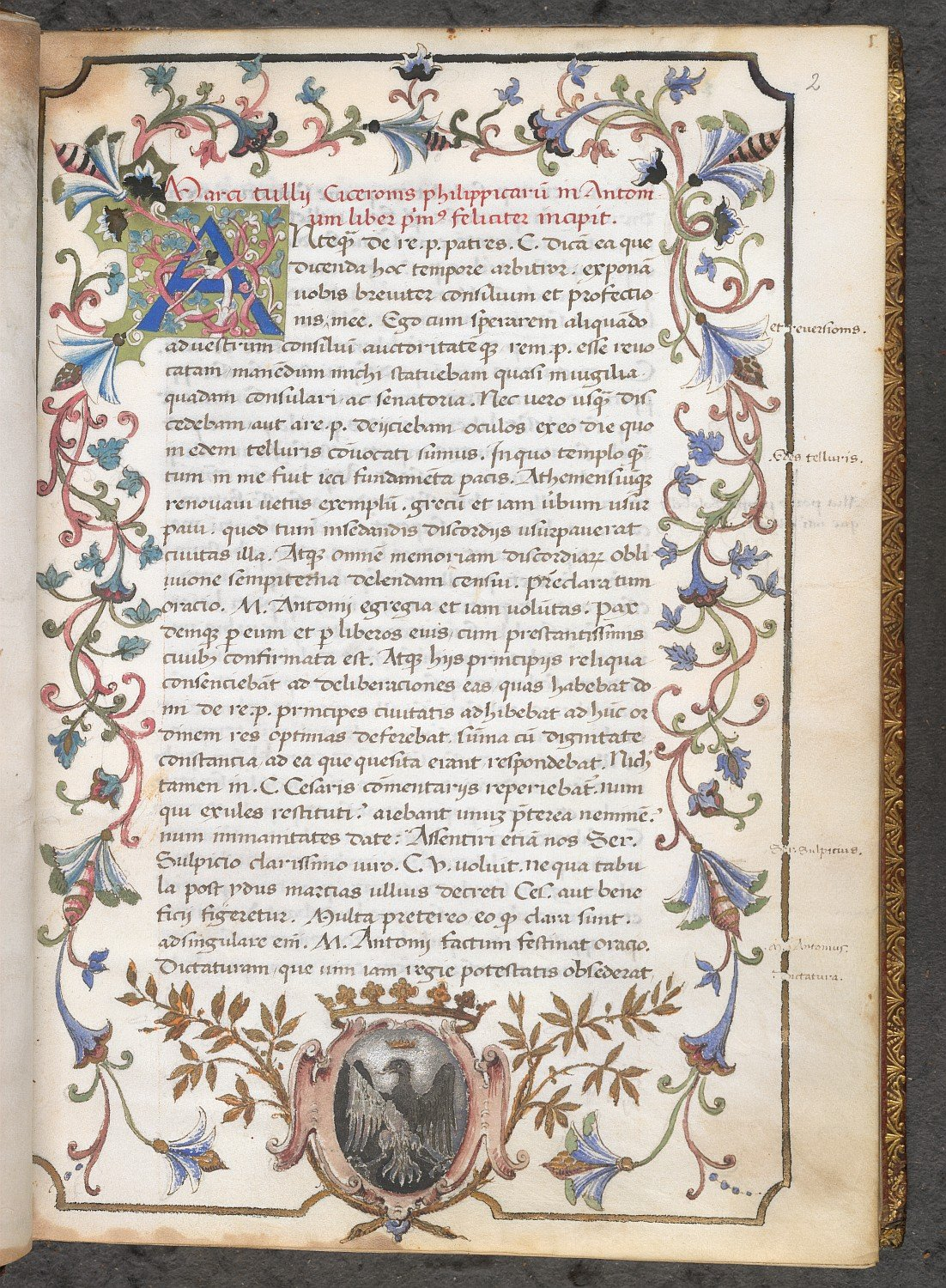
Cicero's Philippics, 15th-century manuscript, British Library

The Philippics (Latin: Philippicae, singular Philippica) are a series of 14 speeches composed by Cicero in 44 and 43 BC, condemning Mark Antony. Cicero likened these speeches to those of Demosthenes against Philip II of Macedon; both Demosthenes' and Cicero's speeches became known as Philippics. Cicero's Second Philippic is styled after Demosthenes' On the Crown.

The speeches were delivered in the aftermath of the assassination of Julius Caesar, during a power struggle between Caesar's supporters and his assassins. Although Cicero was not involved in the assassination, he agreed with it and felt that Antony should also have been eliminated. In the Philippics, Cicero attempted to rally the Senate against Antony, whom he denounced as a threat to the Roman Republic.

The Philippics convinced the Senate to declare Antony an enemy of the state and send an army against him. However, the commanders were killed in battle, so the Senate's army came under the control of Octavian. When Octavian, Antony and Marcus Lepidus formed the Second Triumvirate, Antony insisted that they proscribe Cicero in revenge for the Philippics. Cicero was hunted down and killed soon after.

== Political climate ==
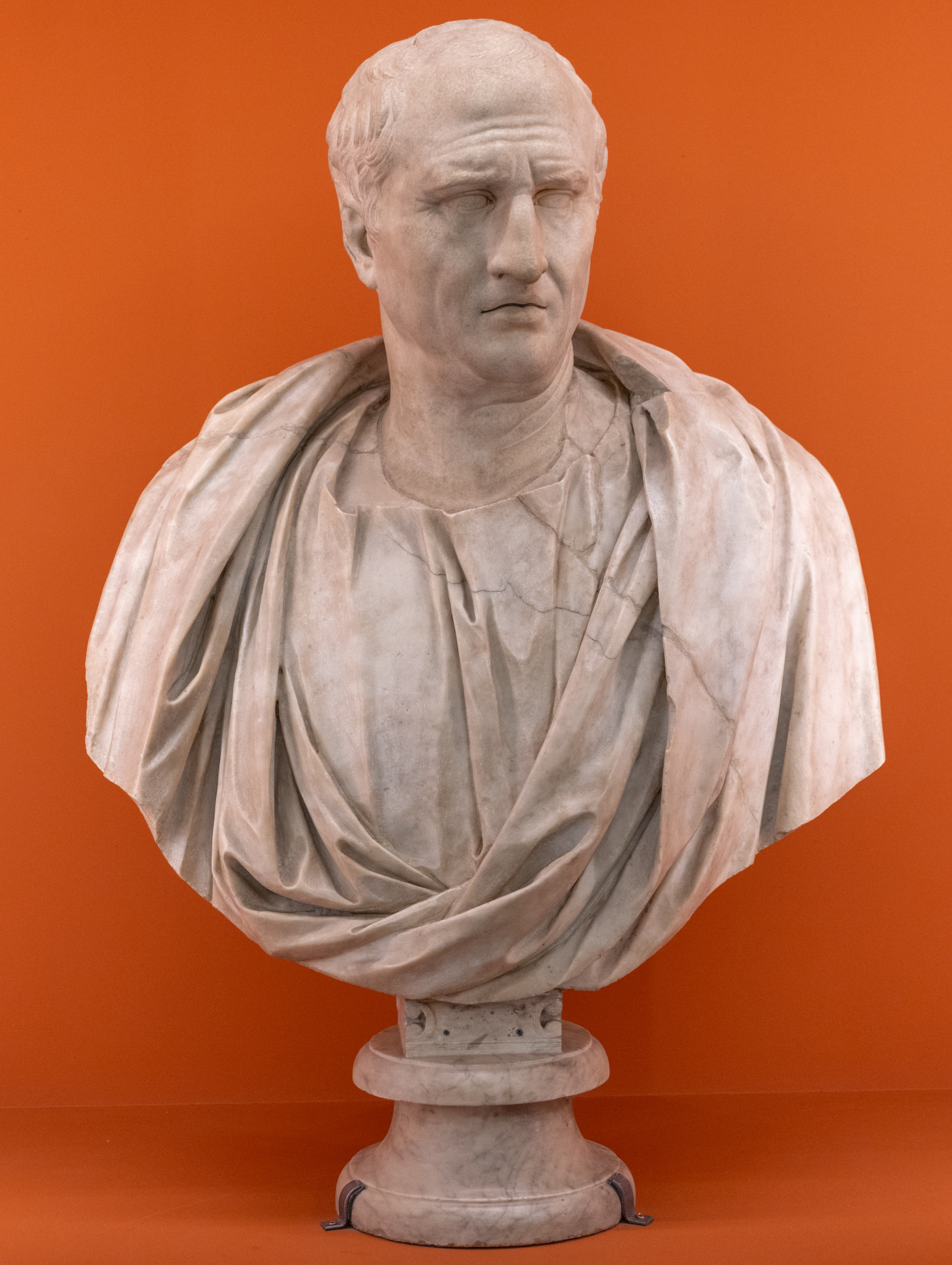
Bust of Marcus Tullius Cicero, 1st century AD, Capitoline Museums, Rome

On 15 March 44 BC, Julius Caesar, the dictator of the Roman Republic, was assassinated by a group of Roman senators who called themselves Liberatores. Cicero was not recruited in the conspiracy and was surprised by it, even though the conspirators were confident of his sympathy. When Brutus, one of the conspirators, lifted his bloodstained dagger after the assassination, he called out Cicero's name, beseeching him to "restore the Republic!". A letter Cicero wrote in February 43 BC to Trebonius, one of the conspirators, began, "How I wish that you had invited me to that most glorious banquet on the Ides of March!"

Caesar had used his position to appoint his supporters to magistracies (which were normally elected positions) and promagistracies (which were usually assigned by the Senate). This was a clear violation of the Roman constitution and left Caesar's supporters, known as the Caesarian faction, vulnerable to their appointments being declared illegal by the Senate. Following the assassination, the Caesarians sought to legitimise their positions and to take revenge on the assassins.

With the Caesarians and supporters of the assassins deadlocked in the Senate, Cicero brokered a compromise: he arranged for the Senate to confirm Caesar's appointees in their posts and in exchange issue an amnesty for the assassins. This brought an uneasy peace between the factions, though it would last less than a year.

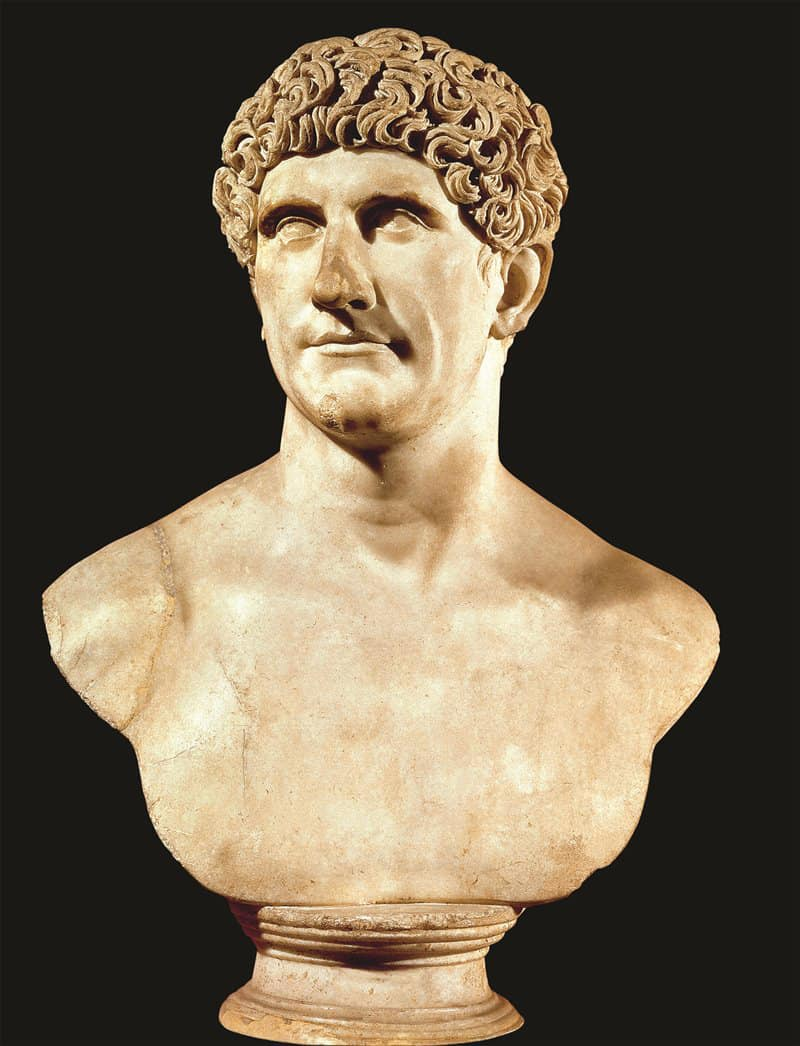
Flavian-era bust traditionally identified as Mark Antony, Vatican Museums

Cicero became a popular leader during the subsequent months of instability. He was opposed by Mark Antony, one of the consuls for 44 BC and the leader of the Caesarian faction. In private Cicero expressed his regret that the assassins had not eliminated Antony as well as Caesar. The two men had never been on friendly terms, and their relationship worsened when Antony began acting as the unofficial executor of Caesar's will. Cicero made it clear that he felt Antony was misrepresenting Caesar's wishes and intentions for his own gain.

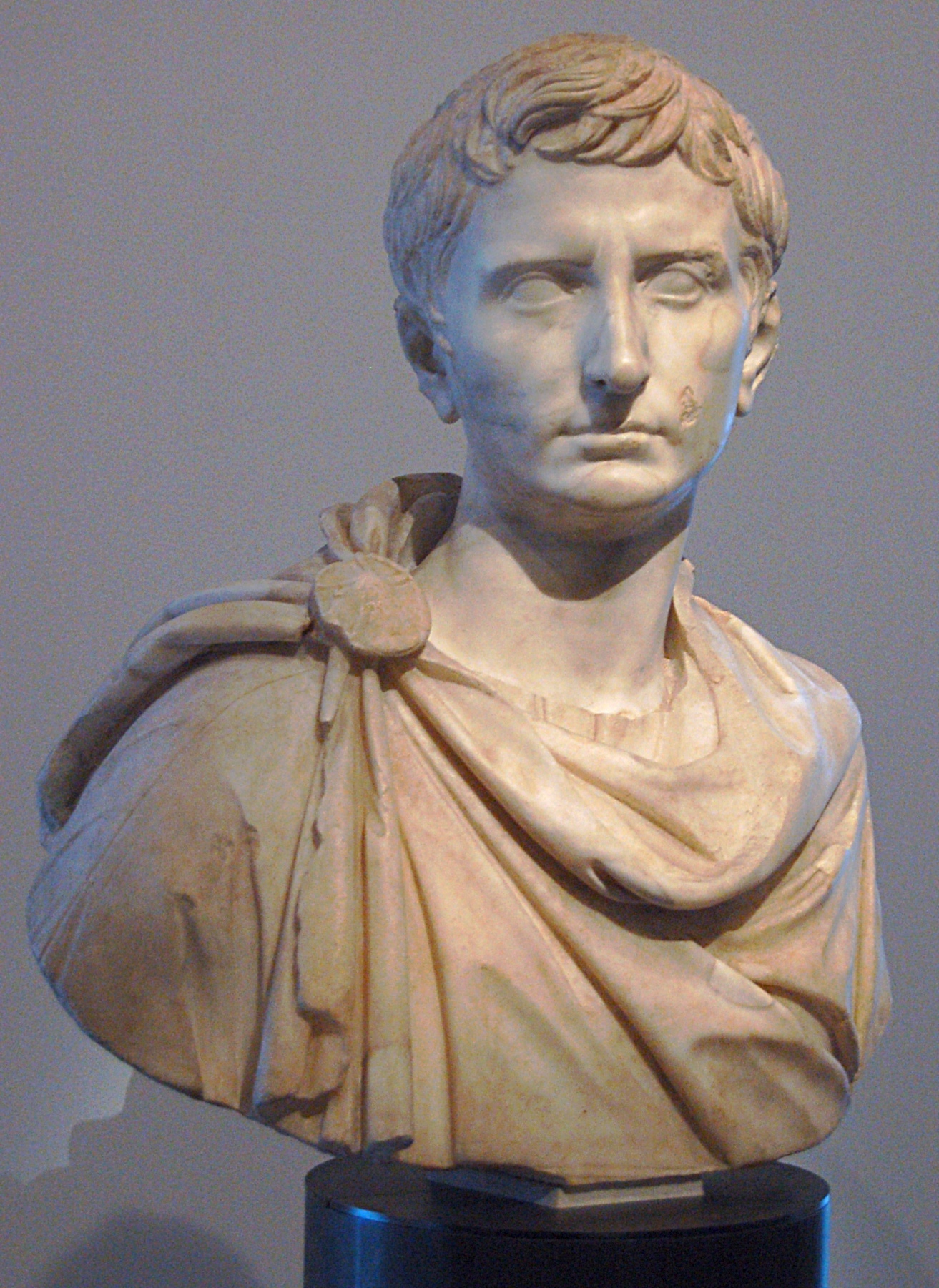
Bust of Octavian, c. 30 BC. Capitoline Museums, Rome

Octavian, Caesar's adopted son and heir, arrived in Italy in April and visited Cicero at his villa before heading to Rome. Sensing an opportunity, Cicero encouraged Octavian to oppose Antony. In September Cicero began attacking Antony in a series of speeches that he called the Philippics in honour of his inspiration, Demosthenes' speeches denouncing Philip II of Macedon. Cicero lavished praise on Octavian, calling him a "god-sent child", claiming that the young man desired only honour and would not make the same mistakes as Caesar had.

During the period of the Philippics, Cicero's popularity as a public figure was unrivalled. He was appointed princeps senatus ('first man of the Senate') in 43 BC, becoming the first plebeian to hold the position. Cicero's attacks rallied the Senate to firmly oppose Antony, whom he called a "sheep". According to the historian Appian, for a few months Cicero "had the [most] power any popular leader could possibly have".

== Speeches ==
The fourteen speeches were:

- 1st Philippic (speech in the Senate, 2 September 44): Cicero criticises the legislation of the consuls in office, Mark Antony and Publius Cornelius Dolabella, who, he said, had acted counter to the will of the late Caesar (acta Caesaris). He demands that the consuls return to looking after the welfare of the Roman people.
- 2nd Philippic (pamphlet, conceived as a senatorial speech, 24 October 44, possibly published only after the death of Cicero): Vehement attacks on Mark Antony, including the accusation that he surpasses in his political ambition even Lucius Sergius Catilina and Publius Clodius Pulcher. Catalogue of the "atrocities" of Mark Antony. It is the longest of Cicero's Philippics.
- 3rd Philippic (speech in the Senate, 20 December 44, in the morning): Fearing prosecution once his term as consul ends on 1 January, Antony has left Rome with an army, heading for Cisalpine Gaul. Cicero calls on the Senate to act against Antony and demands that they show solidarity with Octavian and Decimus Brutus Albinus (one of Caesar's assassins who was now serving as the governor of Cisalpine Gaul).
- 4th Philippic (speech in the public assembly, 20 December 44, in the afternoon): Cicero denounces Mark Antony as a public enemy and argues that peace with Antony is inconceivable.
- 5th Philippic (speech in the Senate, held in the Temple of Jupiter Capitolinus, 1 January 43, in the presence of the new consuls Aulus Hirtius and Gaius Vibius Pansa Caetronianus): Cicero urges the Senate not to send an embassy to Mark Antony and warns against Antony's intentions. Cicero proposes that the Senate honour Decimus Brutus, Octavian and his troops, and Marcus Aemilius Lepidus. Cicero's proposals are declined; the Senate sends the three ex-consuls Lucius Calpurnius Piso Caesoninus, Lucius Marcius Philippus, and Servius Sulpicius Rufus to Mark Antony.
- 6th Philippic (speech in the public assembly, 4 January 43): Cicero describes the embassy carried out by the Senate as merely delaying an inevitable declaration of war against Mark Antony. He believes war will come after the return of the ambassadors. He appeals for unanimity in the fight for freedom.
- 7th Philippic (speech in the Senate, outside the agenda, in mid-January 43): Cicero presents himself as an attorney of peace but considers war against Mark Antony as a demand of the moment. Once more, he demands that negotiations with Mark Antony be discontinued.
- 8th Philippic (speech in the Senate, 3 February 43): Because Antony has turned down the demands of the Senate, Cicero concludes that the political situation is a de facto war. He would rather use the word bellum (war) than tumultus (unrest) to describe the current situation. He criticises the ex-consul Quintus Fufius Calenus, who wants to negotiate peace with Mark Antony: peace under him would be the same as slavery. He proposes amnesty to all soldiers that will leave Antony before 15 March 43, but those who stay with him later should be considered public enemies. The Senate agrees.
- 9th Philippic (speech in the Senate, 4 February 43): Cicero demands that the Senate honour Servius Sulpicius Rufus, who died during the embassy to Mark Antony. The Senate agrees to this proposal.
- 10th Philippic (speech in the Senate, in mid-February 43): Cicero praises the military deeds of Marcus Junius Brutus in Macedonia and Illyricum. He demands that the Senate confirm Brutus as the governor of Macedonia, Illyricum, and Greece together with the troops. The Senate agrees.
- 11th Philippic (speech in the Senate, end of February 43): Cicero castigates Dolabella for having murdered Gaius Trebonius, the governor of Asia. He demands that the governorship of Syria be given to Gaius Cassius Longinus. The Senate turns down this proposal.
- 12th Philippic (speech in the Senate, beginning of March 43): Cicero rejects a second embassy to Mark Antony, even though he was at first ready to participate in it. The Senate agrees.
- 13th Philippic (speech in the Senate, 20 March 43): Cicero attacks Antony for conducting war in North Italy (Antony was besieging Decimus Brutus in Mutina). He comments upon a letter of Antony to "Gaius Caesar" (Octavian) and Aulus Hirtius. He rejects the invitation to peace by Lepidus, referring to Antony's "crimes". He demands that the Senate honour Sextus Pompeius.
- 14th Philippic (speech in the Senate, 21 April 43, after the Senatorial victory over Antony at the Battle of Forum Gallorum): Cicero proposes a thanksgiving festival and praises the victorious commanders and their troops. He demands that Mark Antony be declared a public enemy (hostis). The Senate agrees to the latter proposal.

=== Lost and Fragmentary Speeches ===
In addition to the Philippics above, scholars are aware of six lost Philippics and one from which only a single sentence survives:

- De Pace ad Senatum (speech in the Senate, 17 May 44 BC).
- De Pace ad Populum (speech in the public assembly, 17 or 18 May 44).
- De imperatore adversus Dollabellum (speech in the public assembly, late February 43 immediately after the 11th Philippic).
- De imperio Antoni (43).
- In P. Servilium Isauricum (9 April 43).
- In Antonium et Lepidum (43).
- De liberis Lepidi (43).

=== Analysis ===
The first two speeches mark the outbreak of the enmity between Mark Antony and Cicero. It is possible that Cicero wanted to invoke the memory of his successful denunciation of the Catiline conspiracy; at any rate, he compares Mark Antony with his own worst political opponents, Catiline and Clodius, in a clever rhetorical manner.

In the 3rd and 4th speeches, delivered on 20 December 44, he tried to establish a military alliance with Octavian; the primary objective was the annihilation of Mark Antony and the restoration of the res publica libera – the free republic; to reach this goal, he favoured military means unambiguously.

As the Senate decided to send a peace delegation, in the 5th, 6th, 7th, 8th, and 9th speeches, he argued against the idea of an embassy and tried to mobilise the Senate and the Roman people to war.

In the 10th and 11th, he supports a military strengthening of the republicans Brutus and Cassius, but he was successful only in the case of Brutus.

In the 12th, 13th, and 14th, he wanted to wipe out any doubt against his own war policy. After the victory over Mark Antony, he still warns against a too prompt eagerness for peace in his last speech.

== Consequence ==
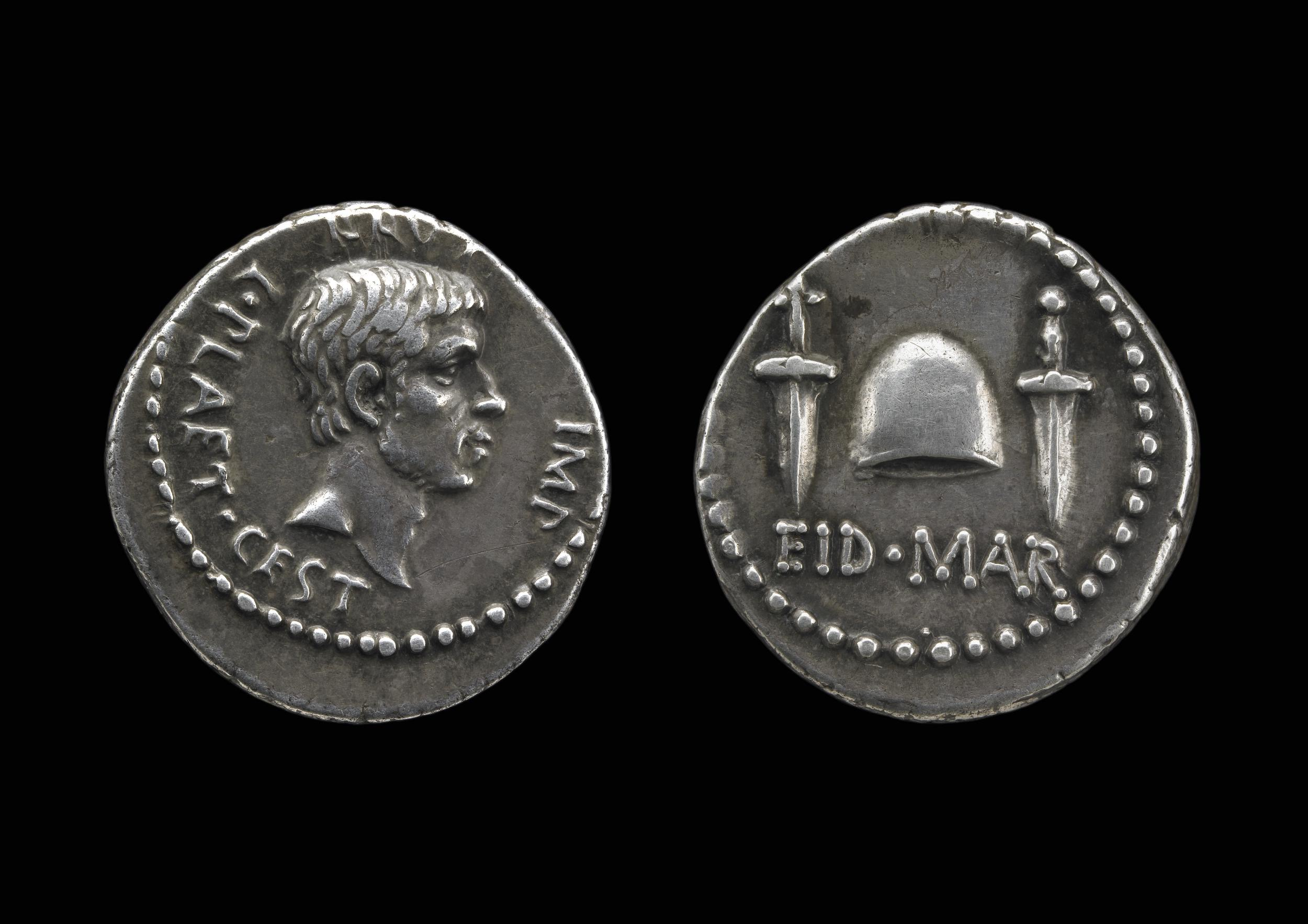
Ides of March coin minted by Marcus Junius Brutus in 43–42 BC; the daggers and pileus celebrate the assassination of Julius Caesar.

Cicero’s attacks on Antony were only partially successful and were overtaken by events on the battlefield. The Senate agreed with most (but not all) of Cicero's proposals, including declaring Antony an enemy of the state. Cicero convinced the two consuls for 43 BC, Aulus Hirtius and Gaius Vibius Pansa, to lead the Senate's armies (with an allied force commanded by Octavian) against Antony. However, Pansa was mortally wounded at the Battle of Forum Gallorum, and Hirtius died at the Battle of Mutina a few days later. Both battles had been victories for the Senate army, but the deaths of its commanders left the force leaderless. The senior magistrate on the scene was Decimus Brutus (the propraetor of Cisalpine Gaul), who the Senate attempted to appoint in command, but Octavian refused to work with him because he had been one of Julius Caesar's assassins. Most of the troops switched their loyalty to Octavian.

With Cicero and the Senate attempting to bypass him, and now in command of a large army, Octavian demanded that he be appointed suffect consul (filling the vacancy left by the deaths of Hirtius and Pansa), even though he was two decades younger than the legal minimum age. When the Senate declined, Octavian marched his army on Rome and occupied the city without resistance. He then secured his election as suffect consul and began to reconcile with Antony. Antony and Octavian allied with each other and Marcus Aemilius Lepidus to form the Second Triumvirate, in opposition to Caesar's assassins. With the triumvirate controlling almost all of the military forces in Italy and Gaul, they turned on Cicero and the Senate.

Immediately after legislating their alliance into official existence (for a five-year term with consular imperium), the triumvirate began proscribing their enemies and potential rivals. Cicero was proscribed, as was his younger brother Quintus Tullius Cicero (formerly one of Caesar's legati) and all of their supporters. They included a tribune named Salvius, who had sided with Antony before switching his support to Cicero. Octavian reportedly argued for two days against Cicero being added to the proscription list, but the triumvirs eventually agreed to each sacrifice one close associate (Cicero being Octavian's).

Most of the proscribed senators sought to flee to the East, particularly to Macedonia, where two more of Caesar's assassins, Marcus Junius Brutus and Gaius Cassius Longinus, were attempting to recruit new armies. Cicero was one of the most doggedly hunted of the proscribed but was viewed with sympathy by a large segment of the public, so many refused to report that they had seen him. He was eventually caught leaving his villa in Formiae in a litter heading for the coast, from where he hoped to embark on a ship to Macedonia. He submitted to a soldier, baring his neck to him, suffering death and beheading. Antony requested that the hands that wrote the Philippics also be removed. His head and hands were publicly displayed in the Roman Forum to discourage any who would oppose the new Triumvirate of Octavian, Mark Antony, and Lepidus.

== Bibliography ==
- M. Tulli Ciceronis Orationes tom. II. Recognovit brevique adnotatione critica instruxit Albertus Curtis Clark (Scriptorvm Classicorvm Bibliotheca Oxoniensis), typogr. ND der Ausgabe Oxford 2. Auflage 1918 [o.J].
- Marcus Tullius Cicero. Die politischen Reden, Band 3. Lateinisch-deutsch. Herausgegeben, übersetzt und erläutert von Manfred Fuhrmann, Darmstadt 1993.
- Stroh, Wilfried: "Ciceros Philippische Reden: Politischer Kampf und literarische Imitation." In: Meisterwerke der antiken Literatur: Von Homer bis Boethius, hrsg. von Martin Hose, München 2000, 76–102.
- Hall, Jon: "The Philippics", in: Brill's Companion to Cicero. Oratory and Rhetoric, hrsg. von James M. May, Leiden-Boston-Köln 2002, 273–304.
- Manuwald, Gesine: "Eine Niederlage rhetorisch zum Erfolg machen: Ciceros Sechste Philippische Rede als paradigmatische Lektüre", in: Forum Classicum 2 (2007) 90–97.
