= Empire (2005 TV series) =

- Genre: Historical drama
- Written by: Sara B. Cooper; Chip Johannessen
- Directed by: John Gray; Kim Manners
- Starring: Santiago Cabrera; Vincent Regan; Emily Blunt; James Frain; Jonathan Cake
- Countries of origin: United States; Canada
- Original language: English
- No. of seasons: 1
- No. of episodes: 6

Production
- Production locations: Rome, Lazio, Italy
- Production companies: Storyline Entertainment; Touchstone Television

Original release
- Network: ABC
- Release: June 28 – July 26, 2005

Empire is an American historical television series for ABC. It is a historical drama set in 44 BC Rome and covers the struggle of a young Octavius (Santiago Cabrera), the nephew and heir of Julius Caesar, to become the first emperor of Rome. Octavius is helped in his quest by a fictitious gladiator called Tyrannus (Jonathan Cake).

The series, filmed entirely in Rome and South Central Italy, was directed by John Gray and Kim Manners, and was produced by Carrie Henderson and Nick Gillott (episodes 4 and 6). It was written by Sara B. Cooper, Chip Johannessen, Tom Wheeler, and William Wheeler.

== Plot ==
Camane, a Vestal Virgin, is the only one of her order to see visions of the future. Desperate to avoid the carnage she foresees, Camane sneaks out of the temple to warn Julius Caesar, his sister Atia, and his nephew Octavius. Ignoring Atia and Octavius's pleas to heed the warning, Caesar returns to the Senate and is murdered by the senators, who fear his increasing power and popularity amongst the citizens of Rome. In the process, the conspirators lose the support of Mark Antony, who is appalled at their treachery. The assassination attempt succeeds because Tyrannus, a former gladiator who serves as Caesar's bodyguard, is distracted by the kidnapping of his young son, Piso, by a group of hired assassins. Tyrannus manages to rescue Piso but returns to a fatally wounded Caesar, who lives long enough to tell him that Octavius is his chosen successor and orders Tyrannus to protect him.

Tyrannus sends his wife and son away and then leaves Rome with Octavius to protect him from assassination. Outside Rome, they begin to seek allies who are willing to overthrow the senate. To Octavius, Mark Antony appears a willing and eager supporter of his cause and the two quickly become close allies. Antony verbally agrees to join Octavius and even signs a document stating that Octavius has the support of his troops should he die; Octavius makes the naïve mistake of offering Antony leadership if he himself should perish. It is after this agreement that Antony's true intentions are made known when he attempts to have Octavius killed. Antony almost succeeds but the weak and poisoned Octavius is saved by a young Marcus Agrippa. Camane, having seen the danger in her visions, arrives and saves Octavius' life by getting the poison out of him. It is then revealed that Camane has fallen in love with Octavius through her visions.

Once recovered, Octavius, Agrippa, and a few companions make for Gaul, where Octavius aims to enlist the help of his uncle's former Legio III Gallica (Third Legion). According to the story, the Third Legion was disgraced in battle and Julius Caesar had one in every ten men killed (decimation). The survivors have remained in the Italian hinterlands ever since, living as bandits and are known as the Lost Legion. At first, these men want to avenge themselves by killing Octavius but Octavius manages to win their support with the help of Cicero.

Tyrannus' wife has died and Piso has been adopted by a noble family on the island to which they fled. Thinking Octavius is dead and desiring to be able to afford the opportunity to raise his son, Tyrannus joins with Mark Antony as a centurion. As a centurion, Tyrannus has the means to educate and raise his son as a nobleman but finds the soldiers under his command to be suspicious of him and upset at being subordinate to this low-born gladiator. After he saves one of his men from being killed, an act that nearly costs him his life, Tyrannus earns the respect of his men. Mark Antony, having allied himself with the Senate, hears of Octavius's survival and moves quickly to intercept him before he can gain too large a following. Antony's army is superior in size to that of Octavius, and it includes the men under the command of Tyrannus.

In the ensuing battle, Octavius rallies his troops, despite being outnumbered. They begin to lose ground and Antony appears to have won. At that moment Tyrannus and his men change sides and turn the tide of battle. As the conflict closes Mark Antony is disarmed but Octavius shows him mercy. For her assistance, Octavius appoints Camane matriarch of the order of Vesta, and she cries as she realizes that she shall never be with him. Octavius appears unmoved. The saddened Camane relates that Tyrannus vanished from the pages of history, having given up a life of renewed glory at Octavius's side to raise Piso and live a normal life.

== Cast ==
- Jonathan Cake as Tyrannus
- Santiago Cabrera as Octavius
- Vincent Regan as Marc Antony
- Emily Blunt as Camane
- Christopher Egan as Marcus Agrippa
- Colm Feore as Julius Caesar
- James Frain as Brutus
- Michael Maloney as Cassius
- Fiona Shaw as Fulvia
- Orla Brady as Atia
- Trudie Styler as Servilia
- Michael Byrne as Cicero
- N'Deaye Ba as Nila
- Dennis Haysbert as Magonius
- Roger Ashton-Griffiths as Panza
- Graham McTavish as General Rapax
- Naomi Westerman as Elena
- Michael Culkin as Lucius
- Terence Maynard as Atticus

== Episodes ==
No.	Title	Directed by	Written by	Original release date
1	"Pilot"	Kim Manners, Greg Yaitanes	Tom Wheeler, Sara B. Cooper, Chip Johannessen	June 28, 2005
2	"Will"	Greg Yaitanes	Chip Johannessen	June 28, 2005
3	"Arkham"	John Gray	William Wheeler	July 5, 2005
4	"The Hunt"	Kim Manners	Sara B. Cooper	July 12, 2005
5	"Fortune's Fool"	John Gray	Tom Wheeler	July 19, 2005
6	"The Lost Legion"	Kim Manners	Tom Wheeler	July 26, 2005

== Historical notes ==
The series compresses and alters historical events, taking significant liberties with the timeline:

- The comical characters Hirtius and Pansa whom Cassius makes consuls and whom Brutus sends to offer a truce to Antony are based on the historical consuls appointed following Caesar's death Gaius Vibius Pansa Caetronianus and Aulus Hirtius. Hirtius had been nominated for the post by Caesar prior to his death; their election was legal and expected. Rather than being executed when they outlived their usefulness, they were in fact killed at the Battle of Mutina when, at Cicero's insistence, they joined his faction in supporting Octavian.
- Octavian was not as clement and ethical over killing his enemies as Octavian portrayed. Although he was not as brutal as Mark Antony in warfare, he was much more so than Caesar. After he defeated the armies of Mark Antony and Cleopatra (who does not appear), he ordered Cleopatra's son Caesarion (the son of Cleopatra and Julius Caesar) put to death out of fear that he might be supported as an alternative ruler of Rome.
- Octavian was renowned for his intelligence, wise and merciless in his rule but he is portrayed here as a careless, rather stupid and weak teenager, who often has to rely on Tyrannus and Agrippa.
- The miniseries portrays Servilia as part of the conspirators' machinations. It is generally accepted that Brutus's wife Porcia Catonis was the main female participant in the conspiracy. Servilia's only known involvement was hosting the conspirators at her villa in the hours following the assassination. The massacre in which she is killed never took place and she in fact lived into the early years of Augustus's reign.
- Marcus Brutus committed suicide following the Battle of Philippi; here the battle does not occur and Antony exiles Brutus, refusing to let him kill himself so he can ‘make himself a martyr for Rome'. Brutus is seen alive and back in Rome at the end of the drama.
- The miniseries ends with a battle between Antony and Octavian a few months after Caesar's death. This is loosely based on the post-Caesarian Battle of Mutina, after which Octavian and Antony called a truce. The decisive confrontation between the armies of Antony and Octavian was the naval Battle of Actium, which took place fourteen years after Caesar’s death. Octavian did not directly lead his forces, though he was the nominal commander; the de facto opposed commanders in the battle were Antony and Agrippa.
- Cicero is portrayed in the series as a friend of Caesar but he was on the side of the Optimates and Liberatores, praising Brutus and the assassins. He was killed by the followers of Antony during the Proscriptions of the Second Triumvirate, admittedly over Octavian's protests.
- The series follows common misconceptions about the weakness of the Caesarians and their allies after Caesar's death. Shortly after Caesar's death, his loyal legions secured Rome under the command of Lepidus, while the young Octavian was one of populares' important politicians; he did not go on the run.
- In the second episode, Cassius and Brutus argue over Caesar's body in Rome's State Crypt. This scene is fictional, the only time when Cassius and Brutus were near Caesar's body was after the assassination.

== Reception ==
The series has received a mixed response, with many film critics giving negative reviews. The drama has been criticized for its lack of historical accuracy and tendency to portray the characters in a simplistic way as either "good guys" or "bad guys".
