= Castelfranco Emilia =

Town in Emilia-Romagna, Italy

- Comune
- Comune di Castelfranco Emilia
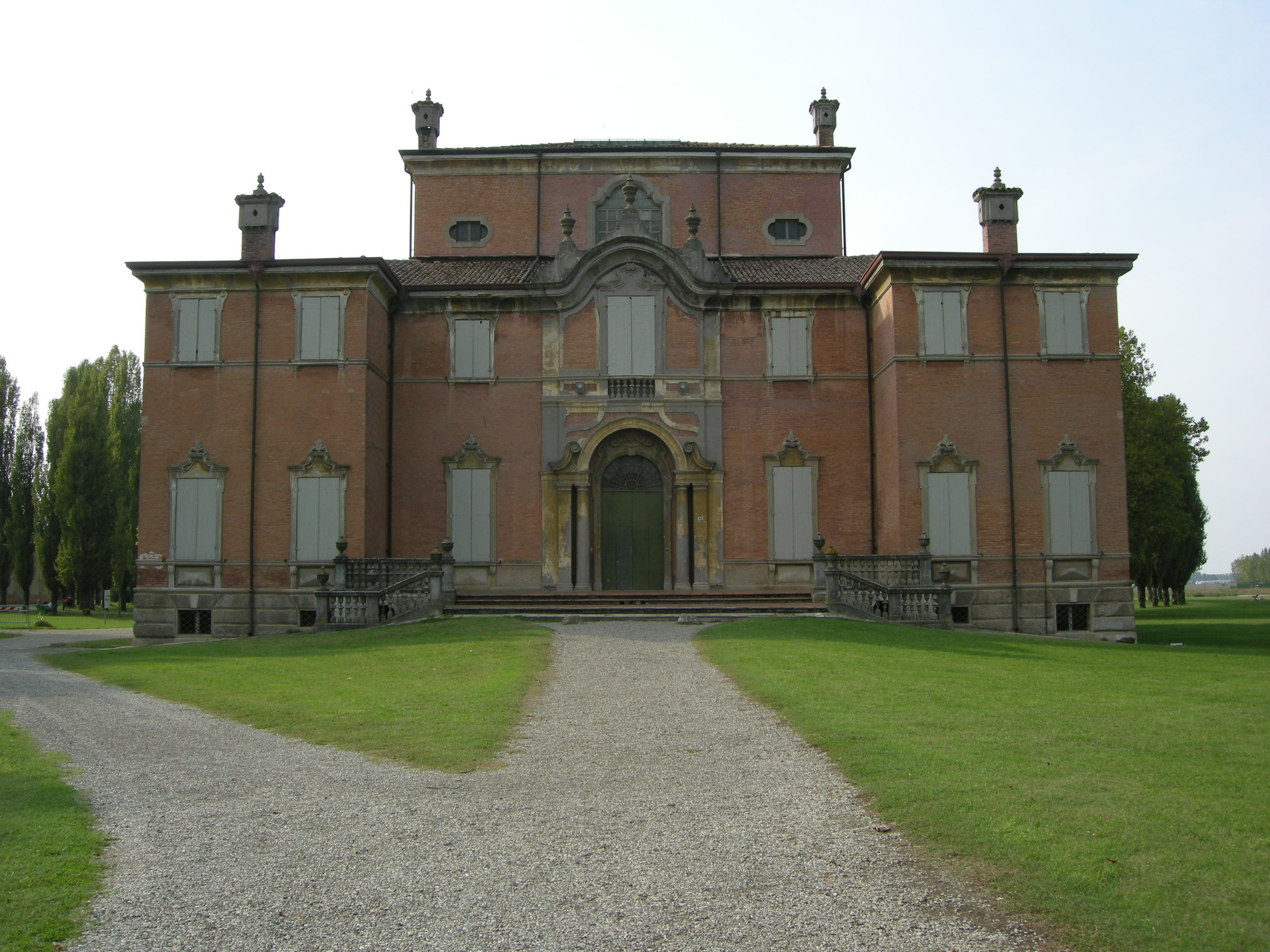
- Villa Sorra

- Coat of arms

- Location within Italy Location within Emilia-Romagna
- Coordinates: 44°35′48″N 11°03′10″E
- Country: Italy
- Region: Emilia-Romagna
- Province: Modena (MO)
- Frazioni: Casale California, Cavazzona, Gaggio, Madonna della Provvidenza, Manzolino, Panzano, Piumazzo, Rastellino, Recovato, Riolo

Government
  - Mayor: Giovanni Gargano (PD)

Area
  - Total: 102.51 km^{2} (39.58 sq mi)
- Elevation: 42 m (138 ft)

Population (30 June 2017)
  - Total: 32,613
  - Density: 318.14/km^{2} (823.99/sq mi)
- Demonym: Castelfranchesi
- Time zone: UTC+1 (CET)
  - Summer (DST): UTC+2 (CEST)
- Postal code: 41013
- Dialing code: 059
- Patron saint: Donnino
- Saint day: September 8
- Website: Official website

Castelfranco Emilia (Western Bolognese: Castèl; Modenese: Castèlfrànc) is a town and comune in Modena, Emilia-Romagna, north-central Italy. The town lies about 25 kilometres (16 mi) northwest of Bologna.

Castelfranco either occupies or lies near the site of the ancient Forum Gallorum, a place on the via Aemilia between Modena and Bologna. Near the town, on 14 April 43 BC, Octavian and Hirtius defeated Mark Antony in a battle during the War of Mutina. The village never gained prominence in ancient times. While it was included in the Tabula Peutingeriana, it was omitted from all other Roman road itineraries.

A fortress was built just outside the town in 1628–34 by Pope Urban VIII as a northern defensive bastion for the Papal States. By the late 19th century, the fortress had been converted to a prison. In 1861 it was joined with the former comune of Piumazzo. This town is home of the tortellini, a typical Italian food. In this region lambrusco wine is also produced. The church of Santa Maria Assunta houses Assumption of the Virgin by Guido Reni.

== People ==
- Alfonsina Strada, the only woman ever to compete in the male Giro d'Italia (1924)
- Valerio Massimo Manfredi, historian, archaeologist and journalist (1943)
- Cécile Kyenge, Italian-Congolese politician and current Member of the European Parliament (1983)

== Twin towns ==
- Marktredwitz, Germany, since 1997
