= Marcus Caecilius Cornutus =

Ancient Roman politician and general

Marcus Caecilius Cornutus (died 43 BC) was an ancient Roman politician and general who served as urban praetor in 43 BC. He was charged by the senate with the defence of the city against the forces of Octavian, who marched on the city demanding his election as suffect consul after the deaths of the two ordinary consuls of that year – Aulus Hirtius and Gaius Vibius Pansa Caetronianus – in battle. After his meagre forces defected to Octavian and Octavian took the city, he committed suicide.
