= Caetronia gens =

Ancient Roman family

The gens Caetronia, occasionally written Cetronia, was a family at ancient Rome that flourished during the late Republic and early decades of the Empire. The nomen Caetronius is Etruscan in origin.

== Members ==
- Caetronius, father of the consul Vibius Pansa, was proscribed by Sulla.
- Gaius Vibius Pansa Caetronianus, natural son of the proscript Caetronius, was adopted by Gaius Vibius Pansa. A supporter of Caesar, he became consul in 43 BC, and died in that year fighting against Marc Antony.
- Gaius Caetronius, legate of the Legio I Germanica in Germania at the accession of Tiberius in AD 14. Following a mutiny of the soldiers, Caetronius held a court martial of the leaders, who were tried and executed by their fellow soldiers.
- Gaius Caetronius Miccio, praefectus of the aerarium militare, or military treasury, then of the aerarium populi Romani.
- Caetronius Cuspianus, a centurion primus pilus, who later served as procurator Augusti in one of the provinces. He was buried in a second-century tomb at Axima, in Alpes Graiae, with a monument from his wife, Aegnatia Priscilla.
- Caetronius Pisanus, praefectus castrorum of the Legio III Augusta in AD 70, under the legate Gaius Valerius Festus, who ordered his arrest out of personal animus, following the murder of Lucius Calpurnius Piso, the proconsul of Africa. Festus described Caetronius as a tool of Piso's, and punished and rewarded various soldiers, so that he could claim to have quashed a rebellion.

== See also ==
- List of Roman gentes

== Bibliography ==
- Publius Cornelius Tacitus, Annales, Historiae.
- Lucius Cassius Dio Cocceianus (Cassius Dio), Roman History.
- Ammianus Marcellinus, Res Gestae.
- Dictionary of Greek and Roman Biography and Mythology, William Smith, ed., Little, Brown and Company, Boston (1849).
- Theodor Mommsen et alii, Corpus Inscriptionum Latinarum (The Body of Latin Inscriptions, abbreviated CIL), Berlin-Brandenburgische Akademie der Wissenschaften (1853–present).
- August Pauly, Georg Wissowa, et alii, Realencyclopädie der Classischen Altertumswissenschaft (Scientific Encyclopedia of the Knowledge of Classical Antiquities, abbreviated RE), J. B. Metzler, Stuttgart (1894–1980).
- Paul von Rohden, Elimar Klebs, & Hermann Dessau, Prosopographia Imperii Romani (The Prosopography of the Roman Empire, abbreviated PIR), Berlin (1898).
- Edmund Groag, Arthur Stein, Leiva Petersen, and Klaus Wachtel, Prosopographia Imperii Romani (The Prosopography of the Roman Empire, Second Edition, abbreviated PIR^{2}), Berlin (1933–2015).
- Syme, Ronald (1939). The Roman Revolution. Oxford: Clarendon Press. Archived.
- Sumner, G.V. (1971). "The Lex Annalis under Caesar". Phoenix. 25 (3): 246–271. JSTOR 1087361.
