= Battle of Mutina =

Battle in 43 BC between Senatorial and Triumvir forces

- Part of the War of Mutina
- Map of the movements of the various legions during the campaigns leading up to the Battle of Mutina
Date	21 April 43 BC
Location	Northern Italy
Result	Senatorial victory

Belligerents
Roman Senate	Mark Antony's forces

Commanders and leaders
Aulus Hirtius †; Octavian; Decimus Brutus Albinus	Mark Antony

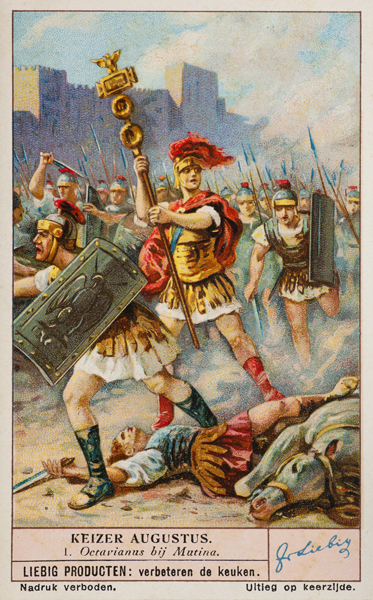
1939 depiction of Octavian at Mutina

The Battle of Mutina took place on 21 April 43 BC between the forces loyal to the Senate under consuls Gaius Vibius Pansa and Aulus Hirtius, supported by the forces of Caesar Octavian, versus the forces of Mark Antony which were besieging the troops of Decimus Brutus. The latter, one of Caesar's assassins, held the city of Mutina (present-day Modena) in Cisalpine Gaul.

Six days earlier, the Battle of Forum Gallorum had ended with heavy losses on both sides and the mortal wounding of consul Pansa. Hirtius and Octavian then launched an attack on Antony's camp, seeking to break the siege. Amid bloody fighting, Hirtius was killed, leaving the army and republic leaderless. Octavian saw action in the battle, recovered Hirtius' body, and managed to avoid defeat. Decimus Brutus also participated in the fighting with part of his forces locked up in the city. Command of Hirtius' legions then devolved to Caesar Octavian. Decimus Brutus, marginalized after the battle, soon fled Italy in the hopes of joining fellow assassins Marcus Junius Brutus and Gaius Cassius Longinus; he was, however, captured and executed en route.

After the battle, Mark Antony decided to give up the siege and retreated westward along the via Aemilia, escaping the enemy forces and rejoining the reinforcements of his lieutenant Publius Ventidius Bassus. The battle brought the brief War of Mutina to a victorious end for the Republicans allied with Caesar Octavian, but the situation would change completely the following autumn with the formation of the Second Triumvirate of Antony, Octavian, and Lepidus.

== Background ==
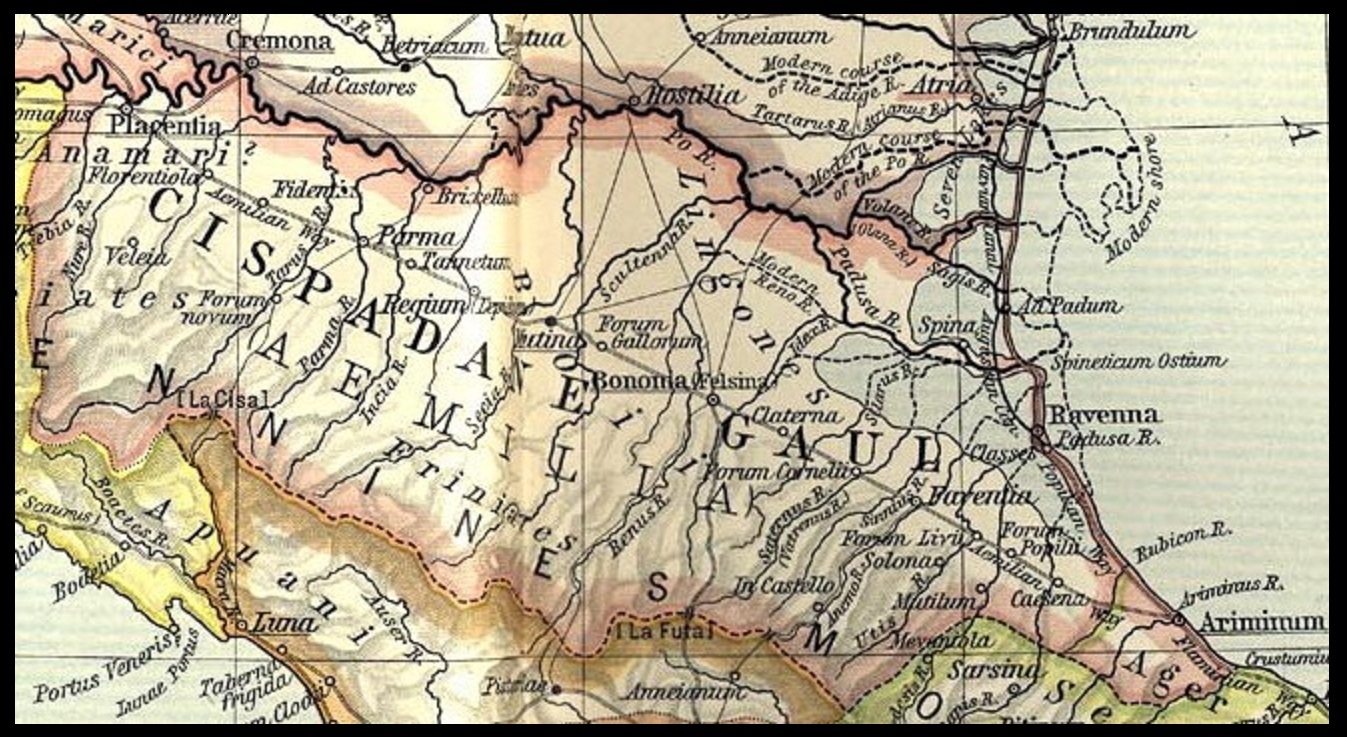
Map of the Regio VIII Aemilia, the part of Cisalpine Gaul in which the Mutina campaign was fought

At the start of the War of Mutina in December 44 BC, Mark Antony besieged Decimus Junius Brutus Albinus – the governor of Cisalpine Gaul – in Mutina in an attempt to force him to surrender the province to him in accordance with an illegal law he had passed earlier that year in June. Over some months, relations between Antony and the Senate in Rome broke down. The consuls for 43 BC – Aulus Hirtius and Gaius Vibius Pansa – were then dispatched north to relieve Decimus Brutus. Joining them was the private army of Caesar's adoptive heir, Octavian, whose command had been legitimised by the Senate.

As Pansa's army moved to join Hirtius, who had previously moved north, Antony ambushed it on the Via Aemilia at the Battle of Forum Gallorum. Successful in defeating and mortally wounding Pansa, his forces were however then themselves set upon by Hirtius and Octavian's veteran forces and were forced to retreat back to the siege works at Mutina. Hirtius and Octavian then moved to engage Antony's forces and relieve the city.

== Battle ==
=== Attack on the camps of Mark Antony ===
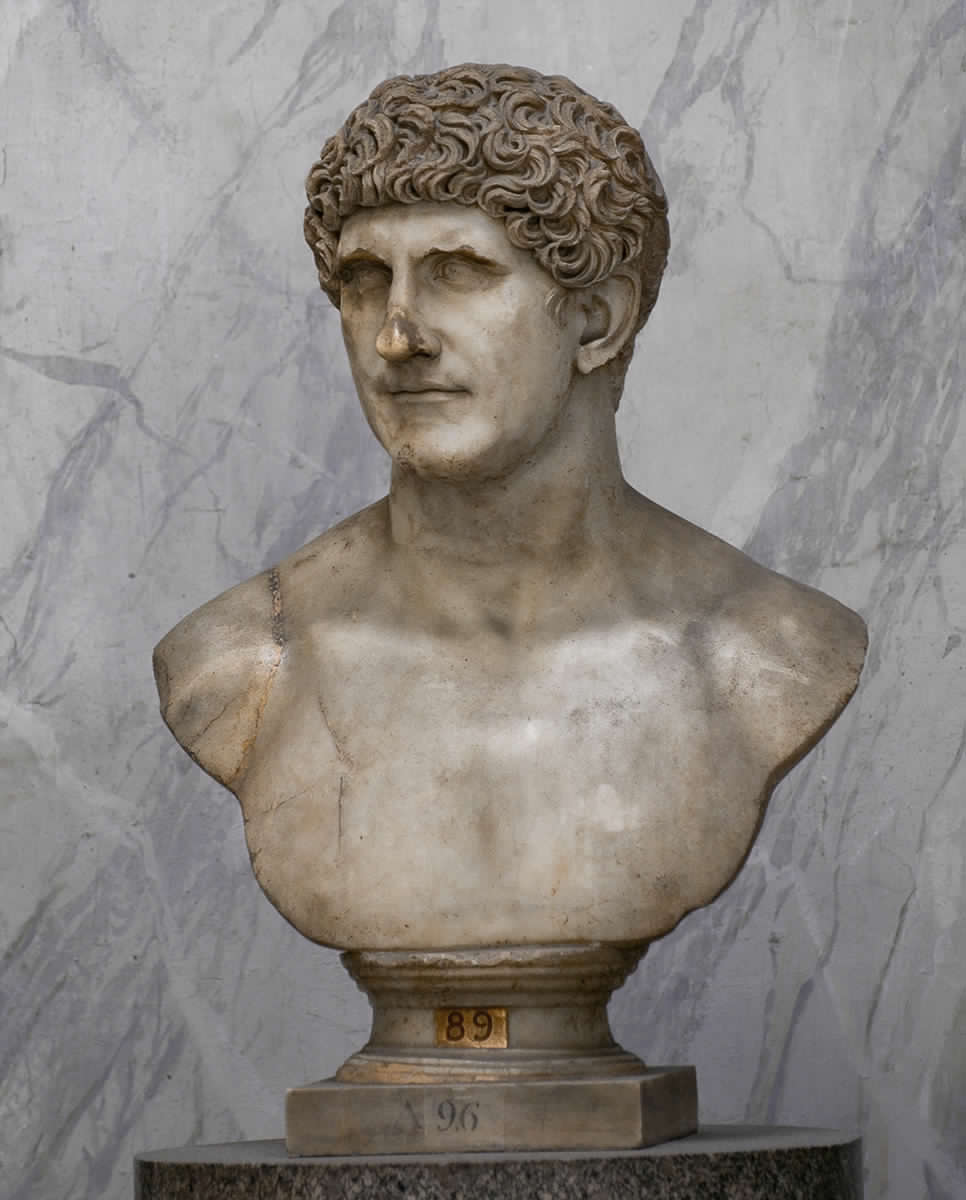
Bust of Mark Antony

Initial news in Rome claimed that the Senate's forces had suffered a defeat at Forum Gallorum, arousing concern and fears among the Republican faction. Only on 18 April did they receive Aulus Hirtius' letter and a report detailing the events of the battle. The victory at Forum Gallorum, wrongly considered decisive, was greeted with enthusiasm; Antony was roundly denounced and his sympathizers forced into hiding. In the Senate on 21 April 43 BC, Cicero emphatically pronounced the Fourteenth and final Philippic, in which he exulted in the victory at Forum Gallorum, proposed forty days of public thanksgiving, and particularly praised the legionaries who had fallen and the two consuls Aulus Hirtius and Vibius Pansa. The latter was injured, but his life did not then seem in danger. The orator rather minimized the contribution of Caesar Octavian, although the young man, despite his minor role in the battle, had been acclaimed imperator on the field by the troops, as had the two consuls Hirtius and Pansa.

The Battle of Forum Gallorum appeared to decide the campaign in favour of the Senate's coalition. Mark Antony, after the losses he had suffered, had retreated with his surviving troops to his camp around Mutina and seemed determined to remain on the defensive. He had, however, strengthened the encircling front around Decimus Brutus in Mutina and continued to maintain his positions. Mark Antony was by no means resigned to defeat, but for the time being he considered it dangerous to court another pitched battle against combined enemy forces that were numerically superior to his own. Instead, he intended to harass and weaken the armies of Hirtius and Octavian with continuous cavalry skirmishes. In this way he hoped to gain time and increase the pressure on Decimus Brutus, whose besieged troops in Mutina were now short of supplies. The consul Hirtius and propraetor Octavian, confident after the victory of Forum Gallorum and reassured by the discipline of their Caesarian legions, were determined to force a new struggle to rescue Decimus Brutus and break the siege of Mutina. After trying unsuccessfully to force Antony into open battle, the two commanders manoeuvred with their troops and concentrated the legions in a field where the enemy camps were less strongly fortified due to the characteristics of the ground.

On 21 April 43 BC, Hirtius and Octavian launched their attack, trying to force a passage for supply columns to the besieged city. Mark Antony initially sought to avoid a general battle and to respond to the challenge with only his cavalry, but when the enemy's cavalry units opposed him, he could not avoid committing his legions to the fray. Antony therefore, in order to keep his siege lines from breaking, ordered up two of his legions to stem the advance of Hirtius and Octavian's massed forces.

Now that the Antonian forces were finally out in the open field, Aulus Hirtius and Caesar Octavian concentrated their legions to attack them. A fierce battle commenced outside the camps. Mark Antony transferred additional forces to meet the onslaught. According to Appian, at this stage of the battle the Antonian forces found themselves struggling mainly because of the slow arrival of their reinforcements; the legions who were caught by surprise and deployed far from the area where the most important clashes were going on, entered the field late and Octavian's forces seemed to have the best of the fighting.

=== Death of Aulus Hirtius ===
While this battle was raging outside the camps, the consul Hirtius took the bold decision to break directly into the camp of Antony with some of his forces. The consul then personally led the Legio III into the camp, making directly for Mark Antony's personal tent. At the same time, Decimus Brutus had finally organized a sortie with some of his cohorts who, under the command of Lucius Pontius Aquila (another of Caesar's assassins), came out of Mutina and attacked the camp of Antony. At first, Hirtius' action appeared successful: the Legio III, after breaking through, fought near Antony's tent; the consul led the legionaries on the frontline; meanwhile, the battle continued in other areas as well. Soon, however, the situation deteriorated for the troops that had beset the camps. Mark Antony's Legio V, which defended the camp, opposed the Legio III, and after an awkward and bloody melee managed to halt its advance, protecting their commander's tent. During the confusion of this fighting, Aulus Hirtius was killed and his legion seemed to be forced to retreat from the ground it had won. As the Legio III began to fold under the Antonian counterattack, other troops led by Caesar Octavian came to their relief. Caesar's young heir found himself in the midst of the fiercest clashes and fought violently to recover Hirtius' body. According to Suetonius, "in the thick of the fight, when the eagle-bearer of his legion was sorely wounded, he shouldered the eagle and carried it for some time."

Octavian eventually managed to recover the consul's remains, but could not keep possession of the camps. In the end, his legions retreated from Antony's camp. At the culminating moment of the battle, Pontius Aquila was killed, and his troops, which had made a sortie out of the city, eventually returned to Mutina. On the basis of the reconstructions of ancient historians it is difficult to know precisely the true course of the final clashes of the battle, with pro-Augustan accounts focused on exalting the role of Octavian and his courageous action to recover the body of the consul Hirtius. Other sources cast doubts on the real actions of the young heir of Caesar; Suetonius and Tacitus report other versions that hint that Hirtius was even dispatched during the melee by Octavian himself in his eagerness to get rid of an uncomfortable political rival. The death of Pontius Aquila, a fierce opponent of the Caesarian faction, has also appeared suspect to some historians.

By virtue of his position as propraetor, Caesar Octavian assumed command of Hirtius' legions. When the Senate ordered that the legions be handed over to Decimus Brutus, Octavian refused, assuming permanent command on the grounds that the established legions would refuse to fight under the command of one of Julius Caesar's assassins. As a result, Octavian came to control eight legions, forces which were loyal to himself rather than to the Republic. He refused to co-operate with Decimus Brutus, whose legions at Mutina began deserting him, many going over to Octavian. His position deteriorating by the day, Decimus Brutus abandoned his remaining legions and fled Italy. He attempted to reach Macedonia, where fellow assassins Marcus Junius Brutus and Gaius Cassius Longinus were stationed, but was captured and executed en route by a Gallic chief loyal to Mark Antony.

=== Mark Antony's retreat ===
The Battle of Mutina ended without a clear victor. Mark Antony, though in serious difficulty under the attacks of the superior enemy forces, had not been annihilated, and the two sides suffered nearly equal casualties. However, the very night of the battle, Antony summoned a war council and determined that further resistance would be useless, despite his lieutenants' exhortations that he renew the attack, taking advantage of his superiority in cavalry and the exhaustion of Decimus Brutus's supplies.

Antony probably did not know about the death of Hirtius or understand the weakness of the legions left to Octavian's command. Rather than contemplating a decisive counterattack, Antony feared a renewed attack on his own camps. He therefore adopted Julius Caesar's expedient after the failure at the Battle of Gergovia and abandoned the siege, hoping to join up with the legions that Ventidius Bassus was bringing from Picenum. Having reconcentrated his forces, he proceeded to march to the Alps to communicate with the Caesarian leaders Marcus Aemilius Lepidus in Gallia Narbonensis and Lucius Munatius Plancus in Gallia Comata. After making his decision, Mark Antony acted swiftly and effectively: the very night after the battle, he sent a message instructing Ventidius Bassus to march quickly through the Apennines and join him with his three legions. He then abandoned the siege on the morning of 22 April 43 BC, retiring with all his surviving forces. In a few days, marching west along the Via Aemilia, his legions reached first Parma and then Placentia without difficulty, for his opponents had remained in Mutina, leaving Antony to gain two days' advantage. Arriving at Tortona, Mark Antony decided to turn southwards and crossed his four legions over the Apennines. In this way, he reached the coast of Liguria west of Genoa at Vada Sabatia, where on 3 May 43 BC, he was joined by Ventidius Bassus with three legions. Antony's lieutenant had not encountered any check to his progress through the mountains to the Ligurian coast; thus, Antony's manoeuvre to extricate himself from Mutina and regrouping proved successful.

== Aftermath and assessment ==
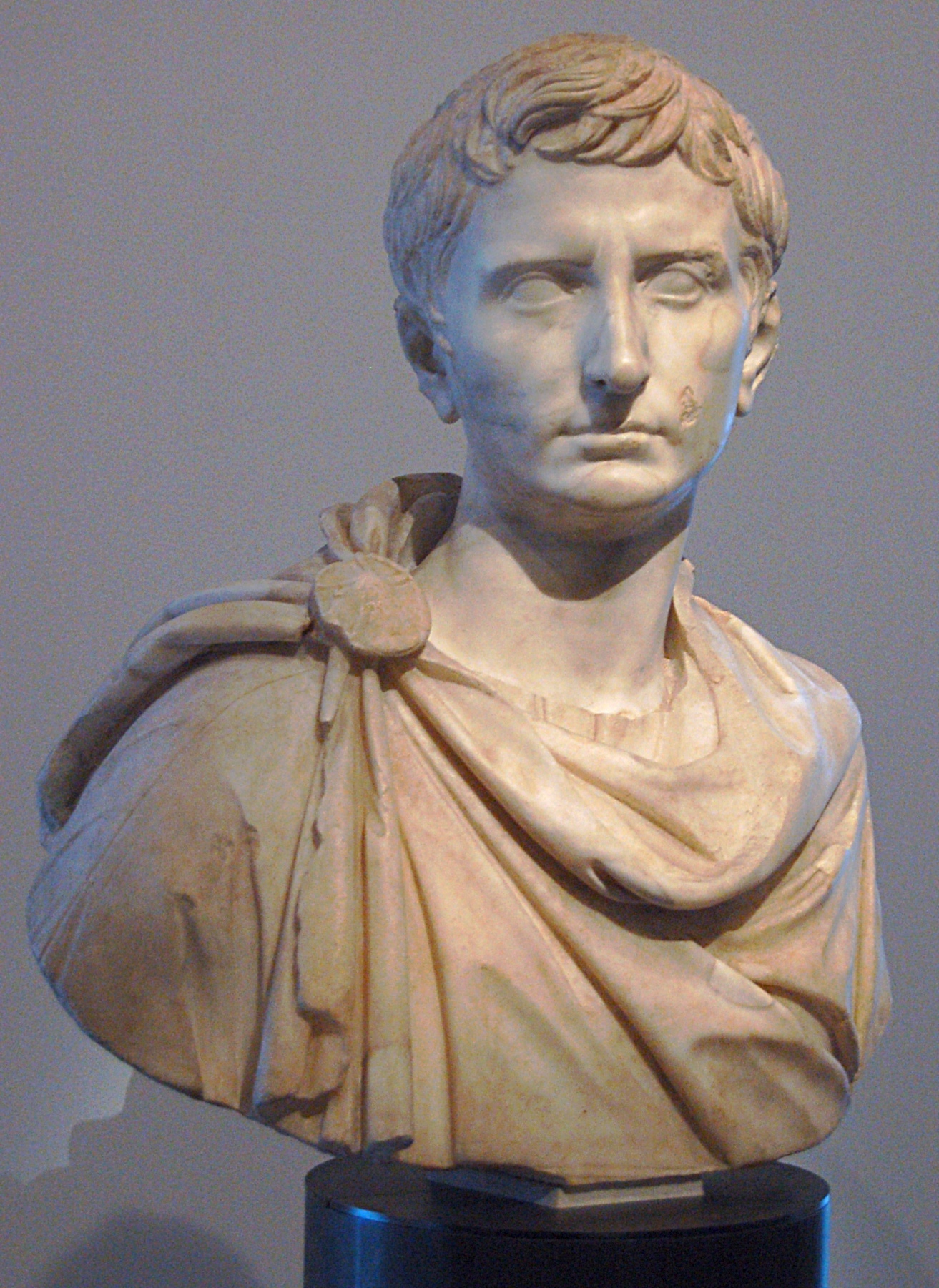
Bust of Caesar Octavian

The victory of the Senatorial forces and the allied faction of young Caesar Octavian at the Battle of Mutina did not decisively put an end to Mark Antony's hostility, who, in a timely and successful retreat, was able to cheat the victors of success in the campaign. The eventual turnaround in Antony's fortunes was facilitated by the breakdown of the precarious alliance between Octavian and the Republican faction led by Cicero. Following the death of Aulus Hirtius in battle on the night of 22–23 April, the consul Vibius Pansa also died as a result of the wounds he had suffered at Forum Gallorum. In this case, too, the circumstances of his death remained obscure and rumours spread, according to Suetonius and Tacitus, that Pansa had been poisoned, with hints that the ambitious Octavian might be implicated.

After the death of the two consuls, Caesar Octavian was left alone at the helm of the Senate's legions. Mutina is essentially where Octavian turns from an inferior young man to an equal of Antony. He immediately adopted an attitude of opposition to Decimus Brutus, refusing any co-operation with this murderer of Caesar. In Rome, Cicero and his supporters in the Senate dismayed Octavian by minimizing his role and assigning the supreme command in the war against Antony to Decimus Brutus alone. Brutus' plans to pursue the enemy were, however, thwarted by the obstructionism of Octavian, who, in command of eight legions at Bononia, did not march to the Apennines to block Ventidius Bassus, as Caesar's assassin had intended. Within a few weeks Mark Antony, strengthened by the legions of Ventidius Bassus, reached the Alps and concluded a formidable alliance with the Caesarian commanders Lepidus, Lucius Munatius Plancus, and Gaius Asinius Pollio, assembling an army of 17 legions and 10,000 cavalry (in addition to six legions left behind with Varius, according to Plutarch). Decimus Brutus, abandoned by his legions and forced to flee to Macedonia, would later be killed by Celtic warriors sent to pursue him by Antony, while Caesar Octavian was eventually to march with his troops on Rome, forcing the Ciceronian faction in the Senate into submission or exile. Following a face-to-face meeting near Bononia in October, Mark Antony, Caesar Octavian, and Lepidus concluded a formal pact. This resulted in their legally becoming the Commission of Three for the Ordering of the State, more commonly known as the Second Triumvirate, through the Lex Titia promulgated in Rome on 27 November 43 BC. The three Caesarian leaders solemnly entered the capital, assumed full political control, and ruthlessly pursued their opponents in the republican faction. Cicero, who was killed on the orders of Antony, was the most high-profile victim of the triumvirate's proscriptions.

In the power struggles ensuing many years later, Octavian would eventually defeat Antony and Cleopatra at Actium in 31 BC and usher in the Principate, but Mutina was the milestone where Octavian first established himself as a force to be reckoned with. Without this victory, Octavian might never have attained the prestige necessary to be looked upon as Caesar's successor, and the stability of the Empire might never have been established in the lasting manner which Octavian had decided for it.
