= Legio II Gallica =

Roman legion

Legio II Gallica was a Roman legion established in Arausio (modern Orange) can be possibly equated with later Legio II Augusta.

== See also ==
- List of Roman legions

== Literature ==
- Lawrence Keppie: Legions and Veterans: Roman Army Papers 1971–2000, Franz Steiner Verlag, 2000, ISBN 3-515-07744-8; chapter The Origins and Early History of the Second Augustan Legion, pages 123–128 (in Google Books). The chapter discusses predecessors of the II Augusta legion and an inscription on the Triumphal Arch of Orange which mentions II Gallica.
