= Publius Cornelius Dolabella (consul 44 BC) =

Roman general and politician (died 43 BC)

- Born: c. 85–69 BC
- Died: 43 BC
- Cause of death: Suicide
Office
XVir sacris faciundis	51–43 BC
Legate (Caesar; Greece)	49–48 BC
Plebeian tribune	47 BC
Legate (Caesar; Spain)	45 BC
Consul (suffect)	44 BC
Septemvir agris dividendis	44 BC
Proconsul (Syria)	44–43 BC
- Spouse(s): Fabia and Tullia
- Partner(s): Caecilia Metella; Antonia Hybrida Minor
- Children: Publius Cornelius Dolabella; Cornelius Dolabella; Cornelius Lentulus

Publius Cornelius Dolabella (c. 85/69 – 43 BC, also known by his adoptive name Lentulus) was a Roman politician and general under the dictator Julius Caesar. He was by far the most important of the patrician Cornelii Dolabellae but he arranged for himself to be adopted into the plebeian Cornelii Lentuli so that he could become a plebeian tribune. He married Cicero's daughter, Tullia, although he frequently engaged in extramarital affairs. Throughout his life he was an extreme profligate, something that Plutarch wrote reflected ill upon his patron Julius Caesar.

== Biography ==
=== Early life ===
His father was likely the urban praetor of 69 BC, Publius Cornelius Dolabella, who also served as governor of Asia. Dolabella was related to the Servilii Caepiones.

Dolabella's birth date is uncertain.

=== Military and political careers ===
In the Civil Wars (49–45 BC) Dolabella at first took the side of Pompey, but afterwards went over to Julius Caesar, and was present when Caesar prevailed at the Battle of Pharsalus (48 BC).

Dolabella had himself adopted by a plebeian so that he could become tribune of the plebs. His adoptive father has been supposed to have been a Lentulus Marcellinus (but the plebeian status of people of this branch is disputed) or Lentulus Vatia (Note: Likely the same man as Lentulus Batiatus who trained Spartacus.) but there is no certainty in the matter. In either case the adopter would likely have been a supporter of Caesar. There was also a woman named Livia who expressed interest in adopting Dolabella (possibly on the behalf of her husband, since women could not adopt legally), but it is unknown if this woman's proposal was in any way connected to his adoption by Lentulus.

As a tribune for the plebs for 47 BC, Dolabella had tried to bring about constitutional changes, one of which (to escape the urgent demands of his creditors) was a bill proposing that all debts should be canceled. He tried to enlist the support of Mark Antony, but his fellow tribunes Gaius Asinius Pollio, consul in 40 BC, and Lucius Trebellius Fides advised Antony not to support the measure. Antony, who also suspected he had been cuckolded by Dolabella, took up arms against him when Dolabella occupied the Forum in an attempt to use force to pass the bill. The Senate voted to support this, and a clash ensued in which both sides took losses. Upon his return from Alexandria, Caesar, seeing the expediency of removing Dolabella from Rome, pardoned him, and subsequently took him as one of his generals in the expedition to Africa and Spain.

After Caesar had returned to Rome and been elected consul for the fifth time, he proposed to the Senate that his consulship be transferred to Dolabella. Antony protested, causing a huge disruption that made Caesar withdraw the motion out of shame. Later, Caesar exercised his role as dictator and directly proclaimed Dolabella consul. This time Antony called out that the omens were unfavorable and Caesar again backed down and abandoned Dolabella.

On Caesar's death in 44 BC, Dolabella seized the insignia of the consulship (which had already been conditionally promised him), and, by making friends with Brutus and the other assassins, was confirmed in his office. When, however, Mark Antony offered him the command of the expedition against the Parthians and the province of Syria, he changed sides at once. His journey to the province was marked by plundering, extortion, and the murder of Gaius Trebonius, governor of Asia, who refused to allow him to enter Smyrna.

Dolabella was thereupon declared a public enemy and superseded by Cassius who attacked him in Laodicea. When Cassius's troops captured the city (43 BC), Dolabella ordered one of his soldiers to kill him.

=== Marriages ===
Dolabella was married to a woman named Fabia and had a son by the same name with her. The son may have been Publius Cornelius Dolabella the consul of 35 BC. He was also married to Cicero's daughter Tullia (Note: Dolabella's first wife Fabia may have been Tullia's maternal half-aunt.) in 50 BC. In May 49 BC she gave birth to a premature son of seven months that did not survive long after birth. In 45 BC Tullia divorced him and gave birth to a son named Lentulus at her father's house, some weeks after the birth she died of complications and the boy is suspected to have died young since his grandfather Cicero does not mention him after 45 BC.

== Cultural depictions ==
=== Stage ===
Dolabella plays a focal role in John Dryden's 1600s play All for Love, where he is portrayed as warning Cleopatra (Note: This act likely belongs to Dolabella's son by Fabia.) about Octavian planning to kidnap her and her children to Rome, which convinces Cleopatra to kill herself. This version of Dolabella is highly fictionalized and a composite character of several ancient Roman people. A similar version of Dolabella appears in William Shakespeare's Antony and Cleopatra as an ally of Octavian, though again this is likely a composite character.

=== Literature ===
He also appears as a character in the novel The Bloodied Toga by William George Hardy. He is also a supporting character in the Masters of Rome series by Colleen McCullough.

== See also ==
- Cornelia gens

== Bibliography ==
- Broughton, Thomas Robert Shannon (1952). The magistrates of the Roman republic. Vol. 2. New York: American Philological Association.
- Shackleton Bailey, D.R. (1976). Two Studies in Roman Nomenclature. Atlanta, GA: Scholars Press. ISBN 1-55540-666-1.
- Tansey, Patrick (2018). "Notabilia varia in the fasti of Alba Fucens". Studi Classici e Orientali. 64: 199–270. ISSN 0081-6124. JSTOR 26495463.

Political offices
Preceded by Julius Caesar V Mark Antony	Roman consul 44 BC (suffect); With: Mark Antony	Succeeded by C. Vibius Pansa; Aulus Hirtius
