= Gaius Vibius Pansa Caetronianus =

Roman Republican politician and consul in 43 BC

Gaius Vibius Pansa Caetronianus (died 23 April 43 BC) was consul of the Roman Republic in 43 BC. Although supporting Gaius Julius Caesar during the Civil War, he pushed for the restoration of the Republic upon Caesar’s death. He died of injuries sustained at the Battle of Forum Gallorum, in which the dual consul Aulus Hirtius also died, leaving their armies under the command of Octavian in the Senate's conflict against Marcus Antonius.

== Early career ==
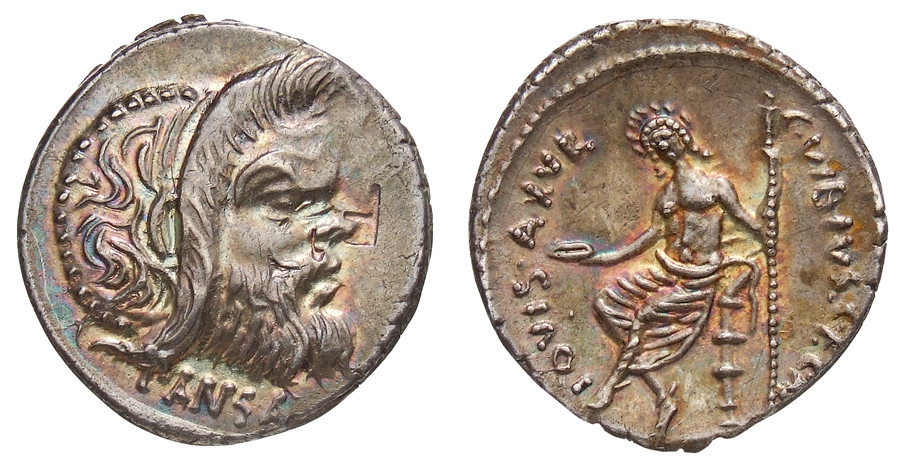
Coin issued by Pansa in 48 BC, with Silenus on the obverse and a laurel-wreathed Jove Axur, holding a patera and sceptre, on the reverse

Pansa was the son of moneyer Gaius Vibius Pansa. One of the first members of the gens Vibia to achieve political success, he was a novus homo ("new man", or self-made man not born into the senatorial order) who rose through the cursus honorum as a result of his friendship with Julius Caesar, under whom he served in Gaul. Pansa hailed from Perusia (modern Perugia) and was of Etruscan descent, as indicated by his second cognomen Caetronianus, and from a family which had been proscribed under Sulla. He was adopted by the moneyer Gaius Vibius Pansa. The luxurious villa-estate at Ossaia near Cortona was probably owned by him as part of the gens Vibia.

Pansa was elected plebeian tribune in 51 BC where he vetoed a number of anti-Caesarean resolutions of the Senate. During the civil war between Julius Caesar and Pompey, he actively supported the cause of the Caesareans. In 48 BC it is believed he was elected either as an aedile or as a praetor.

In 47 BC Pansa was appointed governor of Bithynia et Pontus, and returned to Rome sometime during 46 BC. In that same year, Caesar appointed Pansa as governor of Cisalpine Gaul to replace Marcus Junius Brutus, a post he took up on 15 March 45 BC. Around this time, he was also elected to the post of augur, one of the priests of Ancient Rome. In early 44 BC, Caesar designated him as the consul for the upcoming year (43 BC) and sometime before 21 April 44 BC, Pansa had returned from Cisalpine Gaul, and was based at Campania, waiting for the situation at Rome to settle down after the assassination of Julius Caesar on 15 March 44 BC.

Recognised as a moderate man and a supporter of peaceful compromise, upon his return to Rome, Pansa became the leader of the moderate Caesareans and one of the leading proponents for the return of the Republic, which put him on a collision course with Marcus Antonius, whom Pansa began to oppose by late 44 BC. He had also begun entering into discussions with Octavianus, Julius Caesar’s adopted son, who was also in Campania at the same time as Pansa. Nevertheless, Pansa was not totally hostile to Marcus Antonius, and while he wanted to limit Antonius’s power, he did not want to destroy him totally, nor was he willing to embrace the anti-Caesarean faction in the Senate and begin a new round of civil wars. Added to this was that Pansa was married to Fufia, the daughter of Quintus Fufius Calenus, who was a key supporter of Antonius.

== Consulship and death ==
On 1 January 43 BC, Pansa became consul along with Aulus Hirtius. They opened the debate in the Senate about what course of action was to be taken, if any, against Marcus Antonius. The discussion lasted four days; Pansa’s preference was to unite the Caesarean factions and restore harmony to the Republic, but to no avail. Octavianus refused to co-operate with Antonius, while Marcus Aemilius Lepidus and Lucius Munatius Plancus continued to support Antonius. The end result was the Senate legitimised the army of Octavianus, and assigned him to work alongside Pansa and Hirtius in their upcoming fight against Antonius. The Senate, rejecting Antonius’s compromises, directed the consuls to do whatever was necessary to preserve the security of the Republic and relieve Decimus Junius Brutus Albinus at Mutina. Although Pansa, along with Lucius Julius Caesar successfully prevented Antonius being declared an Enemy of the state, a state of war was declared.

When discussing the state of affairs in the east under Gaius Cassius Longinus and Brutus, Pansa supported the motion to declare the Caesarean Publius Cornelius Dolabella a public enemy, but managed to deny Cicero’s proposal to grant Cassius extraordinary powers in the east to deal with Dolabella. He also legitimised Marcus Junius Brutus’s command in Macedonia, and gave official recognition to Sextus Pompey in Sicily. With the Senate revoking much of the Lex Antonia, especially the contentious Lex Antonia Agraria, Pansa was forced to push through measures which confirmed the colonies for Caesar’s veterans, as well as confirming many of Caesar’s acts and the abolition of the office of Dictator.

All this time Pansa was also responsible for raising fresh levies in order to deal with Antonius. By 19 March 43 BC, Pansa was marching north with four legions of recruits, seeking to join up with Octavianus and Hirtius who were attempting to pin Antonius at Mutina. Antonius, hearing of Pansa's approach, intercepted him on 14 April 43 BC at the Forum Gallorum, some seven miles south-east of Mutina. Antonius crushed Pansa’s army, and Pansa was wounded during the battle. He only managed to escape when Hirtius’s army surprised Antonius on the battlefield, forcing Antonius to flee. For his actions, Pansa (along with Octavianus and Hirtius) was proclaimed imperator by the Senate.

It was soon clear that Pansa was dying. He lived long enough to hear of Antonius’s second defeat at Mutina on 21 April, and the death of his consular colleague Hirtius during the battle. In his last hours he advised Octavianus not to trust Cicero and the rest of the Senate, and that they would turn on him at the first available opportunity. Pansa transferred command of his troops over to his quaestor, Manlius Torquatus, who arrested Pansa’s doctor, Glyco, on suspicion of having poisoned Pansa. Pansa died on 23 April 43 BC and received a magnificent public burial.

== Sources ==
- T. Robert S. Broughton, The Magistrates of the Roman Republic, Vol II (1952).
- Syme, Ronald, The Roman Revolution, Clarendon Press, Oxford, 1939.
- Anthon, Charles & Smith, William, A New Classical Dictionary of Greek and Roman Biography, Mythology and Geography (1860).
- National Museums Scotland nms.scran.ac.uk

Political offices
Preceded by Mark Antony; P. Cornelius Dolabella	Roman consul 43 BC; With: Aulus Hirtius	Succeeded by Octavian; Quintus Pedius as suffecti
