= Aulus Hirtius =

Roman Republican politician and consul in the 1st century BC

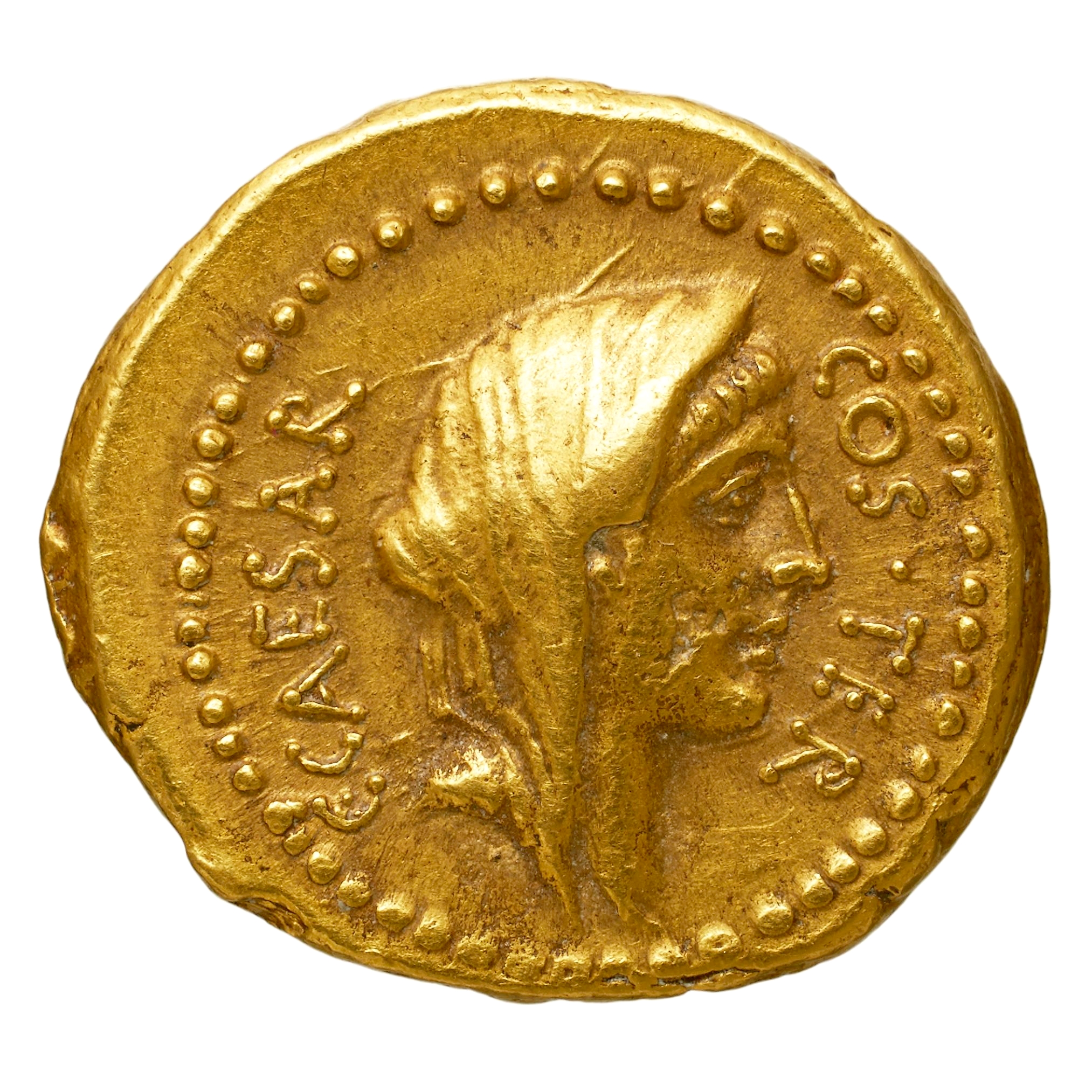
A coin minted under Aulus Hirtius

Aulus Hirtius (Latin: [ˈau̯lʊs ˈhɪrtɪ.ʊs]; c. 90 – 43 BC) was consul of the Roman Republic in 43 BC and a writer on military subjects. He was killed during his consulship in battle against Mark Antony at the Battle of Mutina.

== Biography ==
He was a legate of Julius Caesar's starting around 58 BC and served as an envoy to Pompey in 50. It was reported that Hirtius dined with Caesar, Sallust, Oppius, Balbus and Sulpicius Rufus on the night after Caesar's famous crossing over the Rubicon river into Italy on 10 January 49 BC.

During Caesar's Civil War he served in Spain; he may have been a tribune in 48, and in 47 was at Antioch. He was a praetor in 46 and governor of Transalpine Gaul in 45.

After Caesar's assassination in March 44, Hirtius was deeply involved in the maneuvering between parties. Having been nominated for that post by Caesar, Hirtius and Pansa became consuls in 43.

Initially a supporter of Mark Antony, Hirtius was successfully lobbied by Cicero, who was a personal friend, and switched his allegiance to the senatorial party. He then set out with an army to attack Antony who was besieging Mutina. In concert with Pansa and Octavian (the future Emperor Augustus), Hirtius compelled Antony to retire but was slain in the fighting (April 21) at the Battle of Mutina. He was honored with a public funeral, along with Pansa who died a few days later.

Hirtius added an eighth book to Caesar's De Bello Gallico. He has sometimes been attributed as the author of De Bello Alexandrino, though stylistic analysis since the 1960s, including recent computer-assisted stylistic analysis contradicts this attribution. The subject of De Bello Alexandrino authorship remains a topic of debate among scholars.

Suetonius in Chapter 68 of his Life of Augustus writes that Lucius Antonius, the brother of Mark Antony, accused Augustus of having "given himself to Aulus Hirtius in Spain for three hundred thousand sesterces." This alleged homosexual liaison would have taken place in 46 BC, during the civil wars when Julius Caesar took Octavian to Spain and Aulus Hirtius was serving there. However, it is possible that this was an attempt at slander by Mark Antony, who was Octavian's political opponent at the time. Allegations of homosexual submissiveness was a common method of political attack in the Roman Republic and it is impossible to know how much of it was true.

== See also ==
- De Fato, a dialogue by Cicero, where Hirtius is an interlocutor

Political offices
Preceded by Marcus Antonius; C. Julius Caesar; P. Cornelius Dolabella (as suffect)	Roman consul with Gaius Vibius Pansa Caetronianus; 43 BC	Succeeded by C. Julius Caesar Octavianus; Quintus Pedius
