= Rise of Augustus =

Life from 44 to 27 BC

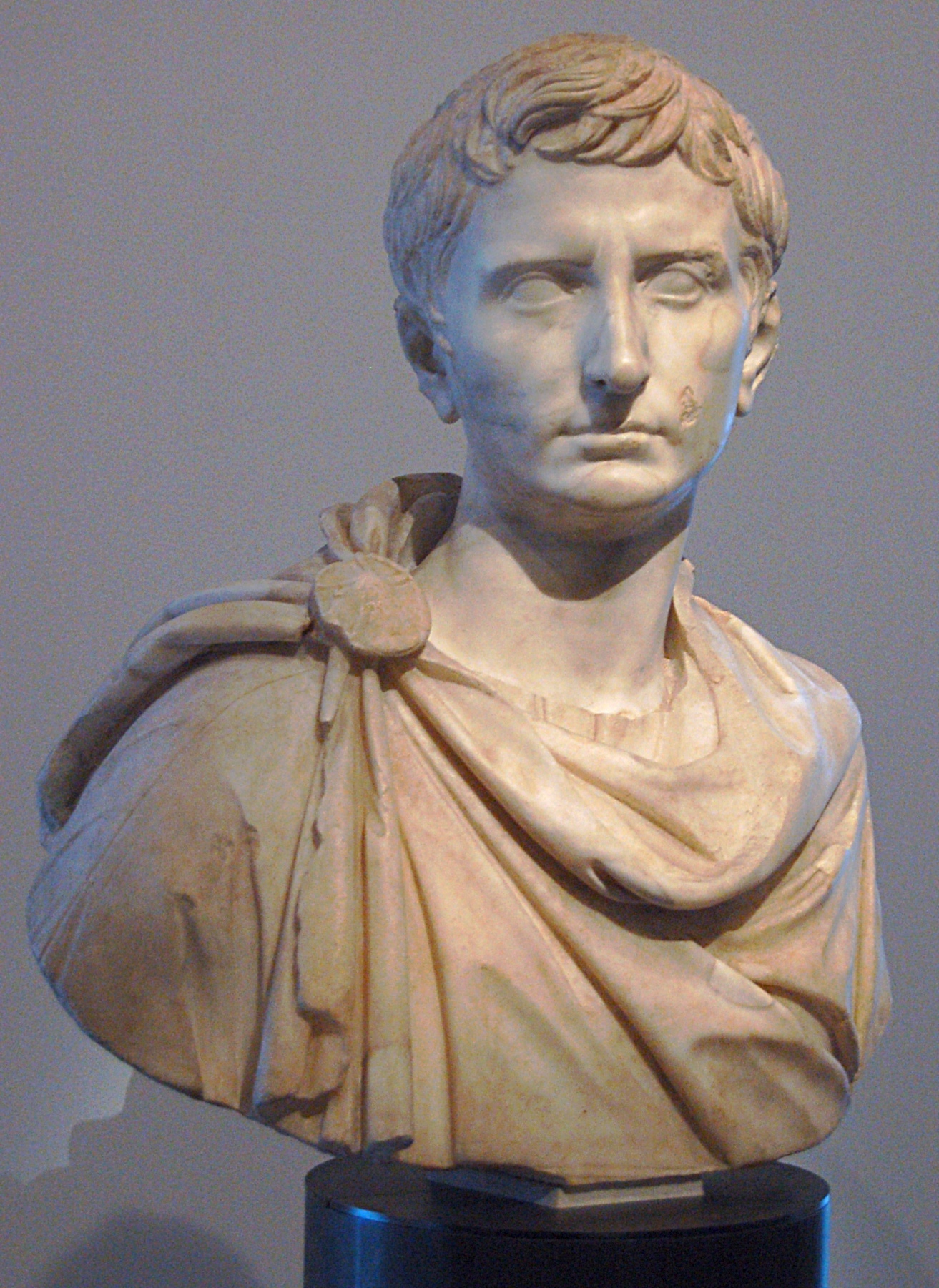
A bust of Octavian dated c. 30 BC, Capitoline Museums, Rome

The rise of Augustus, the first Roman emperor, covers his life from his gathering of legions loyal to Roman dictator Julius Caesar in Roman Italy in 44 BC, following Caesar's assassination on the Ides of March (15 March), until the Roman Senate's bestowal upon him of the title augustus in 27 BC. The latter date marks the traditional end of the Roman Republic and beginning of the Roman Empire. Augustus was born Gaius Octavius in 63 BC and is known during this phase of his life as Octavian (Latin: Octavianus). The period between 44 and 27 BC witnessed the formation of the Second Triumvirate by Octavian, Mark Antony, and Marcus Aemilius Lepidus, and the eventual fissure of this triple dictatorship as Octavian ultimately defeated his rivals.

Caesar's former general Mark Antony served as consul in an erstwhile uneasy truce with Caesar's assassins, until the flight of the assassins from the city of Rome and Octavian's arrival in the city. Antony attempted to thwart Octavian's oversight of games dedicated to Caesar and his inheritance outlined in Caesar's will, but Octavian successfully outmaneuvered Antony by distributing money promised by Caesar to the plebs. While Antony fought Decimus Junius Brutus Albinus in the War of Mutina in Cisalpine Gaul during early 43 BC, the senator Marcus Tullius Cicero attempted to groom Octavian as his protege for public office, having him inducted into the Senate at a young age on account of his private army that could be used to oppose Antony. However, after the siege of Mutina was lifted and Antony retreated north in defeat, Octavian refused to cooperate with the Senate and demanded the consulship. When this was refused he marched on Rome in August 43 BC, had his army occupy the Campus Martius, and was elected as Rome's youngest consul.

Octavian and his co-consul Quintus Pedius rescinded the law branding Antony and Lepidus as outlaws, and Octavian formed an alliance with Antony and Lepidus. The lex Titia passed by plebeian tribune Publius Titius in November 43 BC provided the legal framework for a new triumviral regime formed by Octavian, Antony, and Lepidus, who immediately enacted proscriptions that led to the outlawing, killing, and seizure of property of Caesar's assassins and their allies. At the Battle of Philippi in Roman Greece during October 42 BC Octavian and Antony prevailed against the anti-Caesarian forces led by Gaius Cassius Longinus and Marcus Junius Brutus. Octavian and Lepidus also eventually defeated Sextus Pompeius in Sicily after the latter had blockaded Italy and attempted to carve out a sphere of influence in the Mediterranean. Lepidus attempted to challenge Octavian in Sicily soon afterwards, but Octavian forced him to surrender and exiled him, though he was allowed to hold the prestigious position of pontifex maximus ('supreme pontiff').

Meanwhile, Antony allied himself with Cleopatra, Queen of Ptolemaic Egypt, Caesar's former lover. They married and had three children, and Antony relied on Cleopatra's financial support for military campaigns against the Parthian Empire and Kingdom of Armenia. Given Antony's rejection and divorce of Octavian's sister Octavia Minor, and planned implementation of the Donations of Alexandria that would grant Cleopatra and their children fiefs carved from Roman provincial territory, Octavian depicted Antony as a betrayer of Rome. In 32 BC he forced two consuls loyal to Antony and many senators to flee Rome after taking over the Senate chambers, convinced the remaining Senate to declare war on Cleopatra's regime, and had men across Italy swear an oath of allegiance to him as a mandate for leading the campaign. In 31 BC Octavian's naval forces led by Marcus Vipsanius Agrippa defeated those of Antony and Cleopatra at the Battle of Actium off the northwestern coast of Greece, and in 30 BC Octavian's forces invaded Alexandria and conquered Egypt. Octavian became the first Roman pharaoh of Egypt, and by 27 BC reached a formal settlement with the Senate for control over half of Rome's provinces and most of its armies, in effect becoming the first Roman emperor.

== Heir to Caesar ==
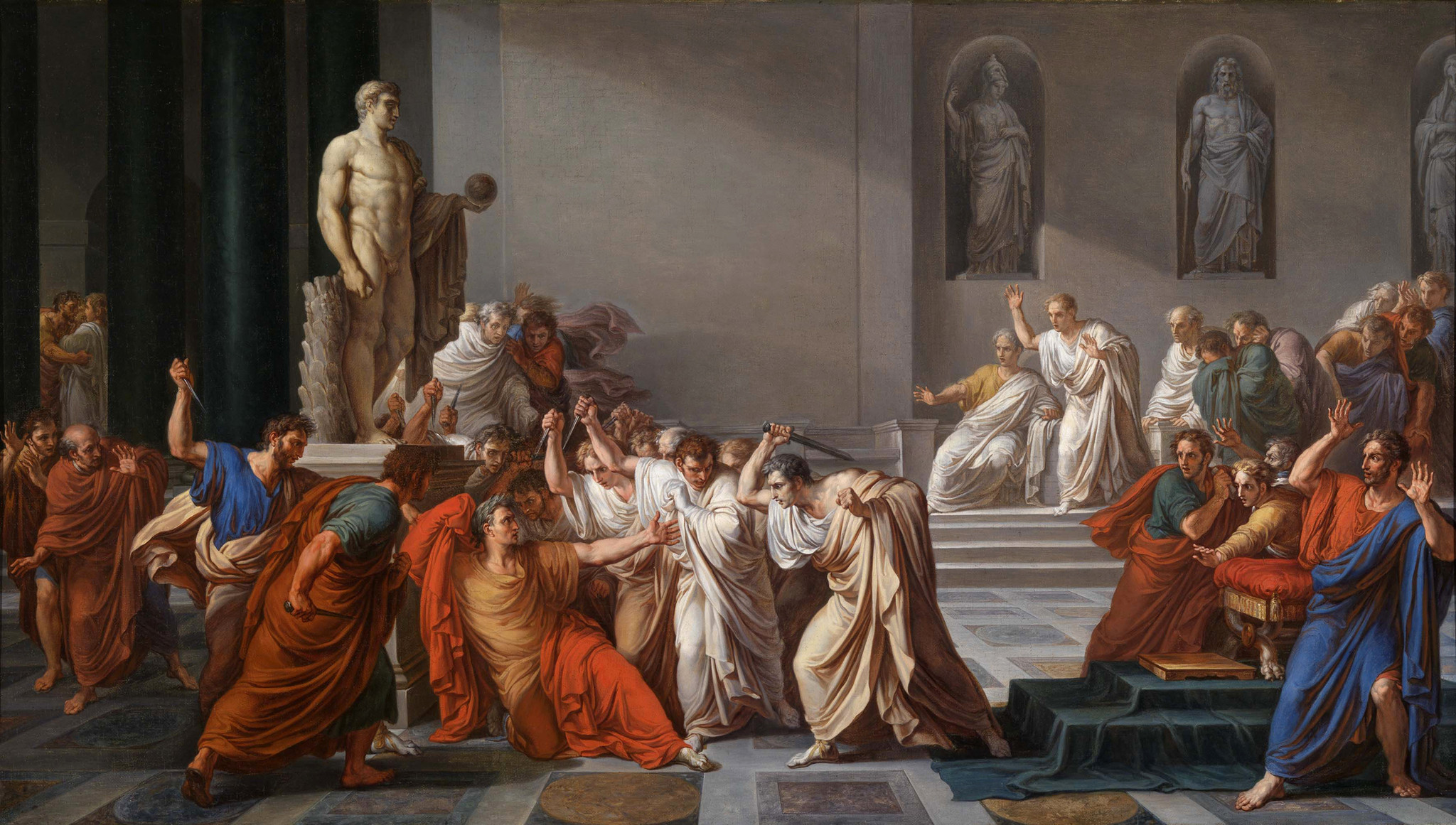
The Death of Caesar by Vincenzo Camuccini, 1805, Galleria Nazionale d'Arte Moderna, Rome

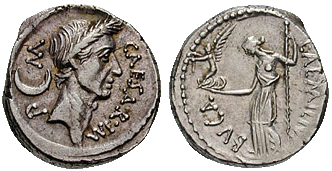
Denarius from 44 BC, showing Julius Caesar on the obverse and the goddess Venus on the reverse of the coin. Caption: CAESAR IMP. M. / L. AEMILIVS BVCA

In 44 BC, Octavian was studying and undergoing military training in Apollonia, Illyria, when his great-uncle Julius Caesar was made Rome's first dictator perpetuo ('dictator in perpetuity') in February, (Note: As Adrian Goldsworthy remarks, with the sole exception of Sulla, who had served various elected terms as dictator, Caesar was elected to serve unprecedented lengthy terms as dictator. He was elected as dictator for a few days in 49 BC to handle the elections of consuls. He was again elected dictator in 48 BC with a one-year term (twice as long as the normal term). As Goldsworthy and Patricia Southern explain, in 46 BC he was elected to a ten-year term as dictator. He was finally made dictator perpetuo ('dictator in perpetuity') in February 44 BC, but was assassinated a month later on the Ides of March.) and then assassinated on the Ides of March (15 March). Octavian consulted with Caesar's loyal army officers stationed in Macedonia for advice on a course of action, and ultimately decided to sail to Italy to ascertain whether he had any potential political fortunes or security. Caesar had no living legitimate children under Roman law. His daughter Julia had died in 54 BC; his son Caesarion by Cleopatra was not recognized by Roman law and was not mentioned in his will. In the absence of sons, Caesar's will made Octavian his main heir with the condition that he take up Caesar's name. After landing at Lupiae near Brundisium in southern Italy, Octavian received a copy of the will, which made him heir to three-quarters of Caesar's estate. Quintus Pedius and Lucius Pinarius were the remaining heirs, likely the children of Caesar's elder sister. (Note: Contra Nicolaus Damascenus, 8.17–18, Octavian was not adopted by Caesar during the latter's life.) Octavian's mother Atia chose not to intervene, while his stepfather Philippus advised him against accepting Caesar's will and to live quietly instead, but Octavian ultimately accepted it on 8 May 44 BC.

Accepting the inheritance by appearing before the urban praetor, Octavian purported that he was adopted as Caesar's son, a legally spurious but politically powerful claim, and assumed his great-uncle's name Gaius Julius Caesar. Roman citizens adopted into a new family usually retained their old nomen in cognomen form (e.g. Octavianus for one who had been an Octavius, Aemilianus for one who had been an Aemilius). Julius Caesar's will entitled Octavian to style himself as Gaius Julius Caesar Octavianus. There is no evidence that Octavian himself used the name Octavianus, seeking to portray himself more closely as Caesar's son; however some of his contemporaries did refer to him as Octavianus, such as Cicero and his stepfather Philippus. Historians usually refer to the new Caesar as Octavian during the time between his adoption and his assumption of the name Augustus in 27 BC, to avoid confusing the dead dictator with his heir.

Octavian could not rely on his limited funds to make a successful entry into the upper echelons of the Roman political hierarchy. After a warm welcome by Caesar's soldiers at Brundisium, Octavian demanded a portion of the funds that were allotted by Caesar for the intended war against the Parthian Empire in the Middle East. This amounted to 700 million sesterces stored at Brundisium, the staging ground in Italy for military operations in the east. A later senatorial investigation into the disappearance of the public funds took no action against Octavian since he subsequently used that money to raise troops against the Senate's enemy Mark Antony. Octavian made another bold move in 44 BC when, without official permission, he appropriated the annual tribute that had been sent from Rome's province of Asia in the Near East to Italy.

Octavian began to bolster his personal forces with Caesar's veteran legionaries and with troops designated for the Parthian war, gathering support by emphasizing his status as heir to Caesar. On his march to Rome through Italy, Octavian's presence and newly acquired funds attracted many, winning over Caesar's former veterans stationed in Campania. By June, he had gathered an army of 3,000 loyal veterans, paying each a bonus of 500 denarii, which was more than a legionary soldier earned after two years of service.

== Growing tensions ==
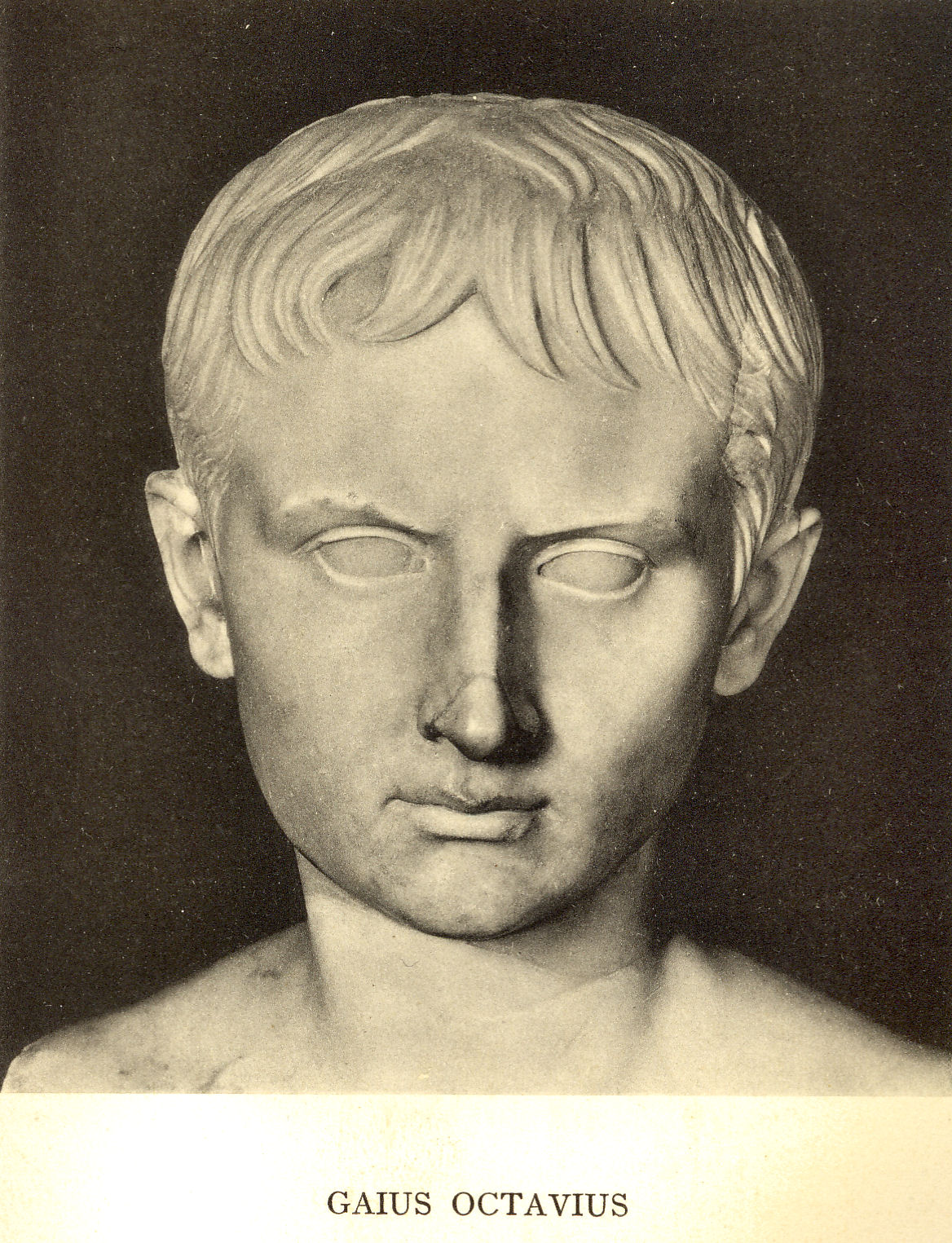
An idealized Roman sculpted portrait of young Octavian as a teenager, possibly produced posthumously or when he was much older, now located in the Vatican Museums

Arriving in Rome on 6 May 44 BC, Octavian found consul Mark Antony, Caesar's former colleague, in an uneasy truce with the dictator's assassins. They had been granted a general amnesty on 17 March in an agreement that they would respect the magistracies installed and laws passed by Caesar to avoid the political turmoil of invalidating them. Soon afterwards, Antony succeeded in driving most of them out of Rome with an inflammatory eulogy at Caesar's funeral, mounting public opinion against the assassins.

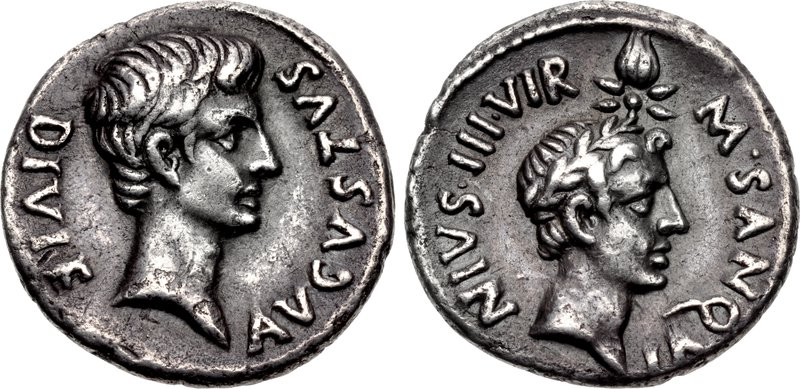
A denarius coin of Augustus struck at Rome in 17 BC depicting Augustus on the obverse and the deified Julius Caesar beneath Caesar's comet on the reverse

Mark Antony was amassing political support, but Octavian still had the opportunity to rival him as the leading member of the faction supporting Caesar. Antony had lost the support of many Romans and supporters of Caesar when he initially opposed the motion to elevate Caesar to divine status. Antony refused to hand over the money due Octavian as Caesar's heir, possibly on grounds that it would take time to disentangle it from state funds, but also as a measure to delay Octavian from carrying out the popular provision in Caesar's will that promised the dispersal of 300 sesterces per capita to the urban plebs of Rome. As consul, Antony blocked the curiate assembly from hearing Octavian's petition to legitimize his supposed adoption by Caesar, Octavian's attempts to reinstate Caesar's golden throne for public view at games staged in April and June, and Octavian's attempts to have Caesar formally deified after a comet seen in July during games honoring Caesar (and Venus) was widely interpreted as a sign of his divinity. Despite Antony's obstructionist tactics, during Caesar's victory games Octavian was able to distribute some of the funds in Caesar's will and combine this with other personal finances to cover half of the promised payouts to the plebs, enhancing his popularity while damaging that of Antony.

During the summer of 44 BC, Octavian won the support of Caesarian veterans and also made common cause with those senators—many of whom were themselves former Caesarians—who perceived Antony as a threat to the state. Antony had lictors drag Octavian away from a trial hearing over the reinstatement of private property seized by Caesar in 49 BC, after which Octavian claimed Antony threatened his life as retribution for ensuring the plebs received their rightful dues. Caesar's veterans then convinced Antony to publicly reconcile with Octavian in the Temple of Jupiter Optimus Maximus. Following this abortive attempt at reconciliation, Antony's bellicose edicts against Brutus and Cassius alienated him from the moderate Caesarians in the Senate, who feared a renewed civil war. In September, Marcus Tullius Cicero, now a political ally of Octavian, began to attack Antony in a series of speeches portraying him as a threat to the republican order.

== First conflict with Antony ==
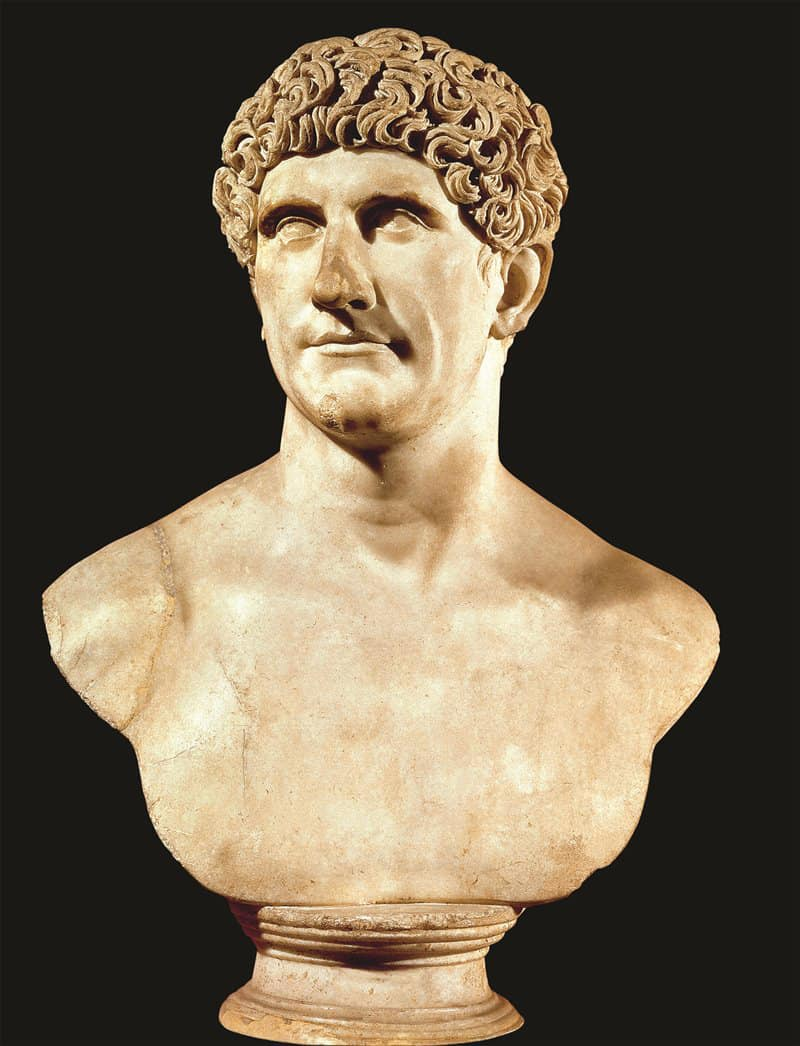
Flavian-era bust traditionally identified as Mark Antony, Vatican Museums

With opinion in Rome turning against him and his year of consular power nearing its end, Antony attempted to pass a plebiscite that would assign him proconsular governorship over the strategic province of Cisalpine Gaul in northern Italy, rather than the province of Macedonia. Octavian meanwhile built up a private army in Italy by recruiting Caesarian veterans, and in early November entered Rome with this private force to challenge Antony. However, they vacated the city shortly afterwards, due to some veterans choosing to quit once it became clear they were involved in a Caesarian squabble rather than a revenge campaign against Caesar's assassins. Nevertheless, on 28 November Octavian won over two of Antony's legions with the enticing offer of monetary gain.

In the face of Octavian's large and capable force, Antony saw the danger of staying in Rome and, to the relief of the Senate, he left Rome for Cisalpine Gaul, which was to be handed to him on 1 January 43 BC. However, the province had earlier been assigned to Decimus Junius Brutus Albinus, one of Caesar's assassins, who now refused to yield to Antony. Antony besieged him at Mutina, and rejected the resolutions passed by the Senate to stop the fighting. The Senate had no army to enforce their resolutions. This provided an opportunity for Octavian, who was already known to have armed forces. Cicero also defended Octavian against Antony's taunts about Octavian's lack of noble lineage and aping of Julius Caesar's name. In defense of Octavian against the taunts of Mark Antony, Cicero stated "we have no more brilliant example of traditional piety among our youth".

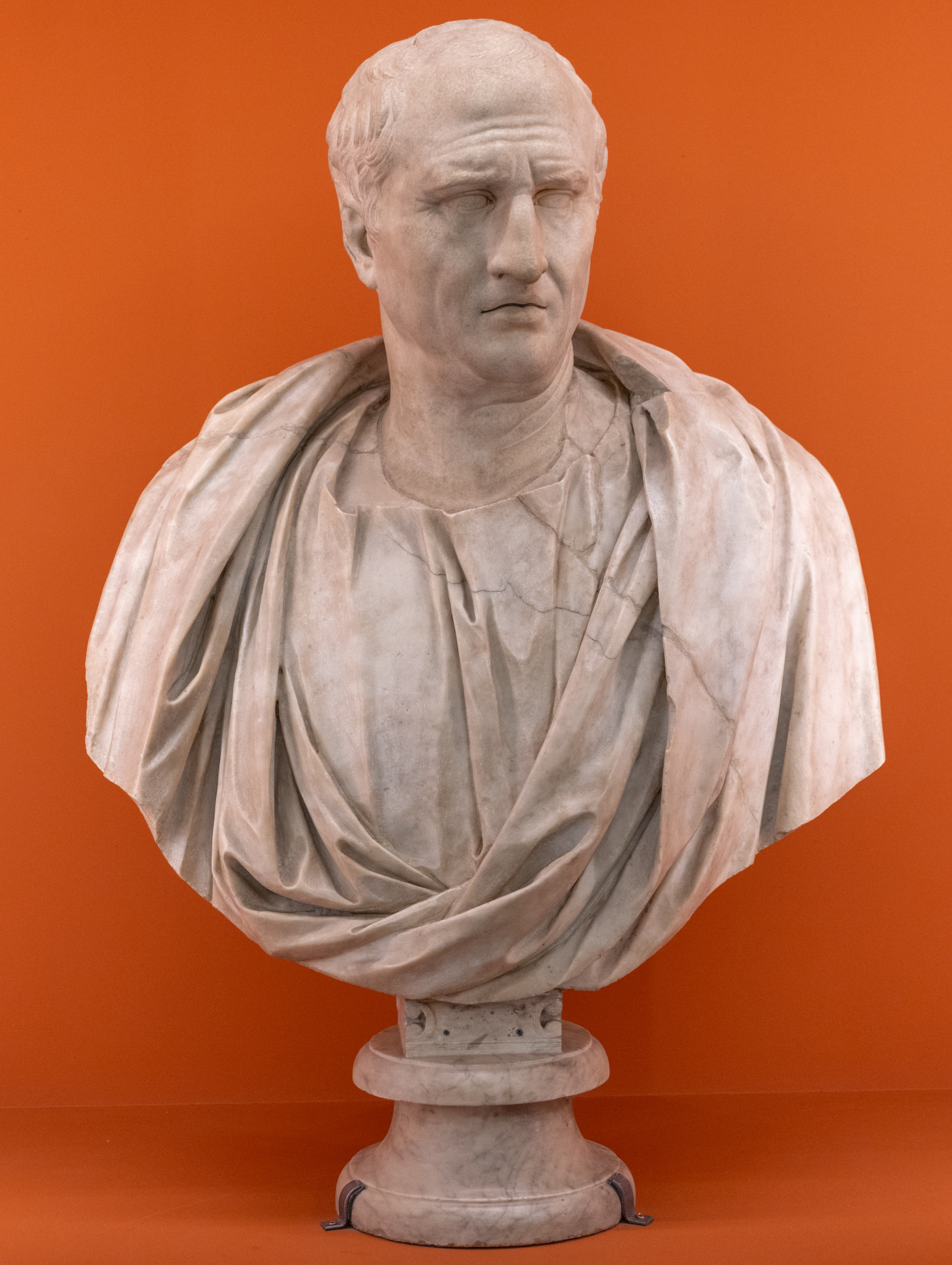
Bust of Marcus Tullius Cicero, 1st century AD, Capitoline Museums, Rome

At the urging of Cicero, the Senate inducted Octavian as senator on 1 January 43 BC, yet he also was given the power to vote alongside the former consuls and the ability to stand for election of offices at an earlier age than usual. In addition, Octavian was granted imperium pro praetore, which legitimized his command, and was sent to relieve the siege along with Hirtius and Pansa (the consuls for 43 BC). He assumed the fasces on 7 January, a date that he would later commemorate as the beginning of his public career. Antony's forces were defeated at the battles of Forum Gallorum (14 April) and Mutina (21 April), forcing Antony to retreat to Transalpine Gaul. Both consuls were killed, however, leaving Octavian in sole command of their armies. These victories earned him his first acclamation as imperator, a title reserved for victorious commanders.

The Senate heaped many more rewards on Decimus Brutus than on Octavian for defeating Antony, then attempted to give command of the consular legions to Decimus Brutus. In response, Octavian stayed in the Po Valley and refused to aid any further offensive against Antony. In July, an embassy of centurions sent by Octavian entered Rome and demanded the consulship left vacant by Hirtius and Pansa, with Cicero as the proposed co-consul, and also that the decree should be rescinded which declared Antony a public enemy. When this was refused, he marched on the city with eight legions. He encountered no military opposition in Rome and on 19 August 43 BC was elected consul with his relative Quintus Pedius as co-consul. At age 19, Octavian became the youngest Roman to be elected as consul, and while the election was maintained with some formality, it was conducted with Octavian's forces stationed on the Campus Martius.

Pedius passed legislation that created a special tribunal; over a single day with Octavian as president, the tribunal tried, convicted, and passed sentences of exile on the Caesarian assassins and alleged associates in absentia. (Note: The law is known as the lex Pedia. See also Augustus, RGDA, 2: "Those who slew my father, I drove into exile, punishing their deed by due process of law". The senatorial decree prohibiting the prosecution of the tyrannicides was overruled by the lex Pedia. Men such as Sextus Pompey not present in the city were also convicted, even if they had nothing to do with the assassination.) Octavian also induced the curiate assembly to have him adrogated into Caesar's family, sanctioning his legally dubious claim of testamentary adoption. Meanwhile, Antony formed an alliance with Marcus Aemilius Lepidus, then governor of Gallia Narbonensis. A fellow Caesarian, Lepidus was branded by the Senate as a public enemy for joining Antony. While Octavian marched north to fight Decimus Brutus and meet with Antony, Pedius convinced the Senate to revoke the law branding Antony and Lepidus as outlaws. Octavian's mother Atia died at some point before he officially allied with Antony and Lepidus in November, with nothing known about her death except that, as consul, Octavian arranged a lavish public funeral service for her.

== Second Triumvirate ==
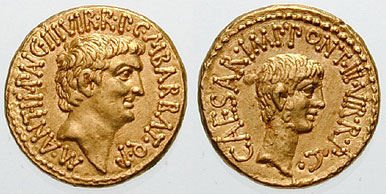
Aureus bearing the portraits of Mark Antony (left) and Octavian (right), issued in 41 BC to celebrate the establishment of the Second Triumvirate. Both sides bear the inscription III vir rpc, meaning 'Three Men for the regulation of the Republic'. Caption: m ant imp aug (Note: aug refers to the religious office of augur, not the title augustus created in 27 BC.) iiivir rpc m barbat (Note: Marcus Barbatius Pollio was a moneyer.) q p / caesar imp pont iiivir rpc.

In a meeting near Bononia in October 43 BC, Octavian, Antony, and Lepidus sketched plans to form the triumvirate, ostensibly for the putting together of the republic. Their agreement, legitimized by law for five years, was then put in to force by the lex Titia, passed by tribune Publius Titius on 27 November that year. The triumvirate, unlike the unofficial "first triumvirate" of Caesar, Pompey, and Crassus, was a formal office; it gave the three men consular power, the right to appoint the magistrates, and allowed their division among themselves of the provinces not under the control of the liberatores in the east. (Note: Karl Galinsky summarizes this political arrangement as follows: "for the next five years they became... tresviri rei publicae constituendae, triumvirs in charge of, literally, 'putting the state together' (hence our term 'constitution'). In effect it was a triple dictatorship". Adrian Goldsworthy describes it as thus: "In 43 BC Antony, Lepidus and Octavian were named as triumviri rei publicae constituendae (board of three to reconstitute the state) by the lex Titia proposed by a tribune and passed by the Concilium plebis". Patricia Southern explains that "the use of the title dictator was a sensitive issue, and the office had been abolished by Antonius soon after Caesar's assassination. It would have been impolitic to reintroduce the concept so soon after the dictatorship had been eradicated". She contends that "the closest analogy for the titles adopted by Antonius, Octavian, and Lepidus does in fact derive from the dictatorship; both Sulla and Caesar were each in their turn legally appointed dictator rei publicae constituendae. The terminology indicates that the dictator Sulla and the dictator Caesar were charged with reconstituting the Republic. Using almost the same formula, the members of the new alliance were appointed Tresviri rei publicae constituendae, with powers confirmed for five years." Southern then claims that "between them the triumvirs possessed powers of a blatantly dictatorial nature." Southern explains that Caesar was assassinated shortly after becoming dictator perptuo ('dictator in perpetuity'), and so the triumvirs were desperate to avoid this "depressing notion" of perpetual dictatorship "by limiting their office to a five-year term".) Octavian had previously been engaged to Servilia, daughter of Publius Servilius Isauricus, but instead became engaged to Claudia, stepdaughter of Antony, a marriage alliance that was intended to solidify their official political union. For the remainder of 43 BC Octavian also relinquished the consulship to Antony's political ally Publius Ventidius, while Quintus Pedius, who died of unknown causes during the proscriptions, was replaced by Gaius Carrinus, another ally belonging to Antony. Allied Caesarian consuls for the ensuing years 42, 41, and 40 BC were also designated at this time, while most magisterial positions in Rome and western provinces were filled with men appointed by the triumvirs (the eastern provinces were still largely controlled by the liberators, or assassins of Caesar).

=== Proscriptions ===
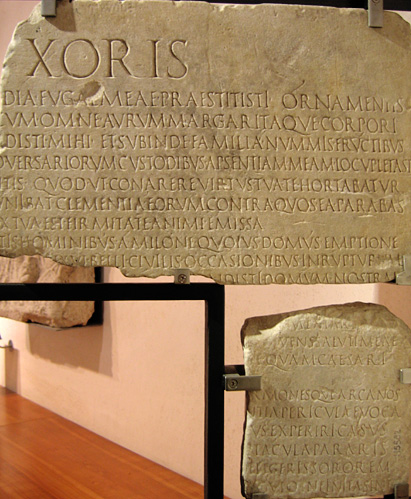
Fragments of the laudatio Turiae, a eulogy for an upper class Roman wife, the latter of whom rescued her husband during the triumviral proscriptions, dated to the last decade of the 1st century BC

The triumvirs then set in motion proscriptions, in which some 300 men were targeted as outlaws, divided roughly evenly between senators and equestrians. Thousands more had their properties confiscated. (Note: Ancient sources differ considerably as to how many men were targeted. Hinard 1985, pp. 266–269, reviews the evidence. Plutarch in three different lives – Brutus (27.6), Cicero (46.2), and Antony (20.2) – gives figures of 200, a bit more than 200, and 300 men, respectively. Livy, Periochae, 120.4, gave only 130 senators and many equites besides. Florus, 2.16.3, gave 140 senators. Appian, Bella Civilia, 4.7, gives 17 names at first before, in two rounds, 130 and 150 others were added. Appian, Bella Civilia, 4.5.7, also gives a total of 300 senators and some 2,000 equites, but this figure describes all persons who were killed or had properties confiscated between 43 and the treaty of Misenum in 39. The number of victims was not necessarily the number proscribed; figures given in Orosius (6.18.10) are corrupt. Around 160 of the proscribed are known by name.) Contemporary Roman historians provide conflicting reports as to which triumvir was most responsible for the proscriptions and killing. However, the sources agree that enacting the proscriptions was a means by all three factions to eliminate political enemies.

Roman historian Velleius Paterculus asserted that Octavian tried to avoid proscribing officials whereas Lepidus and Antony were to blame for initiating them. Cassius Dio defended Octavian as trying to spare as many as possible, whereas Antony and Lepidus, being older and involved in politics longer, had many more enemies to deal with. This claim was rejected by Appian, who maintained that Octavian shared an equal interest with Lepidus and Antony in eradicating his enemies. Suetonius said that Octavian was reluctant at first to proscribe officials but did pursue his enemies with more vigor than the other triumvirs. Plutarch described the proscriptions as a ruthless and cutthroat swapping of friends and family among Antony, Lepidus, and Octavian. For example, Octavian allowed the proscription of his ally Cicero, Antony the proscription of his maternal uncle Lucius Julius Caesar (the consul for 64 BC), and Lepidus his brother Paullus. Plutarch insisted that Octavian defended Cicero at first before giving in to Antony's bloodlust, but historian Patricia Southern suggests that Octavian had his own motives for allowing Cicero to be killed. Southern writes that the "unpalatable truth" is that Octavian had a "vested interest" in removing political enemies, and that Cicero "would perhaps in turn have eliminated [Octavian] if it had been necessary". (Note: Patricia Southern emphasizes the fact that "Cicero did not deny that he had said that the young man [Octavian] must be praised to the skies and then 'immortalised'". Southern continues by saying that Cicero was rewarded with a triumph as consul in 63 BC after "he had the death sentence passed on Catilina and his associates," without a proper lengthy trial. Southern explains that one of these associates "was Antonius' stepfather Lentulus Sura. This was a policy which Julius Caesar had advised against at the time, and the tribune Clodius made Cicero pay dearly for his haste in condemning the so-called Catilinarian conspirators. Octavian probably did not mourn Cicero, though much later, as Augustus, he acknowledged the great qualities of the statesman, when it was safe to do so".)

The proscriptions were motivated in part by a need to raise money to pay the salaries of their troops for the upcoming conflict against Caesar's assassins, Marcus Junius Brutus and Gaius Cassius Longinus, but the main intention was the removal of wartime rivals. Rewards for their arrest gave incentive for Romans to capture those proscribed, while property of those arrested were seized by the triumvirs. However much money was raised was insufficient, possibly due to the few bidders for properties of proscript victims. The triumvirs then introduced a range of new taxes to fund their war. They reinstituted property taxes (in abeyance since 167 BC) and created new imposts on slaves, before also demanding property assessments for taxes on rich women that were reduced after a public protest of women in Rome.

=== Battle of Philippi and division of territory ===
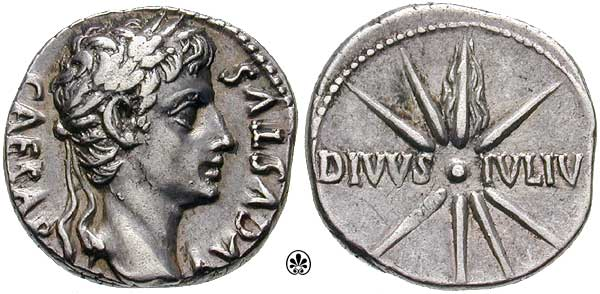
A denarius minted c. 18 BC. Obverse: CAESAR AVGVSTVS; reverse: comet of eight rays with tail upward; DIVVS IVLIV[S], "divine Julius".

On 1 January 42 BC, with Lepidus as consul, the Senate posthumously recognized Julius Caesar as a divinity of the Roman state, divus Iulius. Octavian was able to further his cause by emphasizing the fact that he was divi filius ('Son of the Divine'). Antony and Octavian then sent twenty-eight legions by sea to face the armies of Brutus and Cassius, who had built their base of power in Greece and eastern provinces. After two battles at Philippi in Macedonia in October 42 BC, the Caesarian army was victorious and Brutus and Cassius committed suicide. (Note: Karl Galinsky claims that the battle took place in two parts on 23 October 42 BC, the first engagement ending with Cassius taking his own life, and again in mid-November of that same year, the second engagement ending with Brutus taking his own life. Adrian Goldsworthy claims the first battle took place on 3 October, and the second battle on 23 October 42 BC.)

Mark Antony used the battles of Philippi as a means to belittle Octavian, as both engagements were decisively won with the use of Antony's forces. In addition to claiming responsibility for both victories, Antony branded Octavian as a coward for handing over his direct military control to Marcus Vipsanius Agrippa instead. Octavian was bedridden with illness during the first battle, allegedly removing himself from command over the camp per his doctor's advice, but captured Brutus' camp during the second battle. Galinsky asserts that Octavian saved face from this embarrassment by having the corpse of Brutus beheaded, though historian Adrian Goldsworthy says it is unclear who gave this order. The remains were sent back to Rome for public display, but these were lost in a storm at sea before they could arrive.

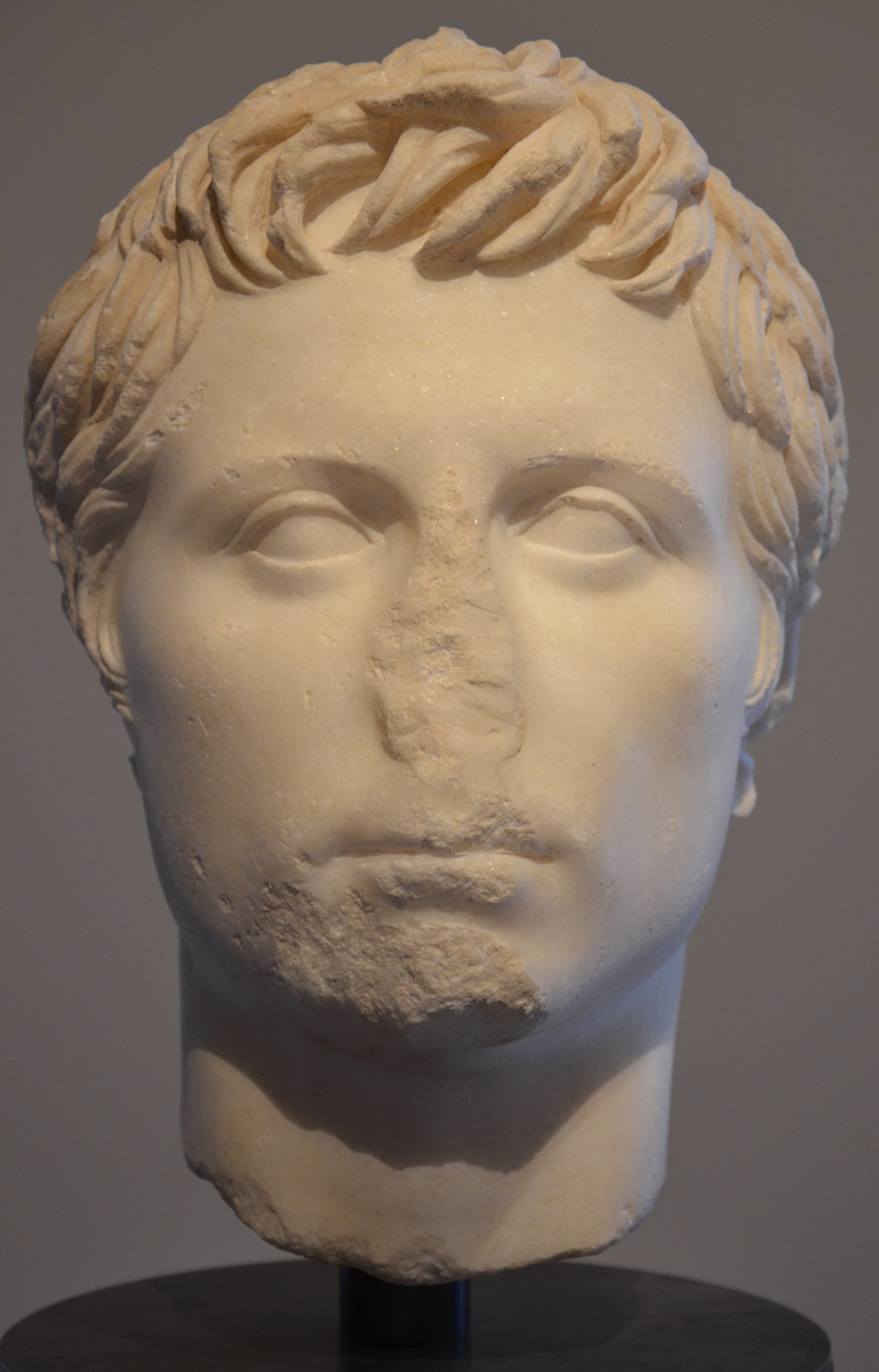
Sculpted marble head of triumvir Octavian dated roughly to the Battle of Philippi in 42 BC, Archaeological Museum of Spoleto

After Philippi, a new territorial arrangement was made among the members of the triumvirate. Lepidus was suspected by Octavian and Antony of colluding with Sextus Pompeius, the son of Pompey and renegade general who had been given command over all Mediterranean coastlines by the anti-Caesarian Senate in 43 BC. Ratified on 20 March 43 BC, the Senate bestowed Sextus Pompeius with the office of praefectus classis et orae maritimae for the Roman navy, granting him control over all coastal areas of the Mediterranean Sea. Cisalpine Gaul was combined with Italia and given to Octavian along with the provinces of Hispania Citerior and Hispania Ulterior that Lepidus had to forfeit. Antony travelled east to Egypt where he allied himself with Queen Cleopatra, a Roman client ruler, former lover of Julius Caesar, and mother of Caesar's son Caesarion. In addition to eastern provinces, Antony also took Gallia Narbonensis from Lepidus, and already controlled Gallia Comata. Lepidus was left with the province of Africa, stymied by Antony, who conceded Hispania to Octavian.

Octavian was left to decide where in Italy to settle tens of thousands of veterans of the African and Macedonian campaigns, whom the triumvirs had promised to discharge. (Note: Karl Galinsky supports the figure of 60,000 veterans needing to be settled in Italy and nearby provinces. Klaus Bringmann suggests that somewhere between 50,000 to 60,000 veterans needed to be settled there by Octavian. Patricia Southern relays how Appian claims the figure was 170,000 veterans, and that historian Lawrence J. F. Keppie had estimated a figure as low as 46,000 in his Colonisation and Veteran Settlement in Italy, 47–14 B.C. (1983).) Those who had fought on the republican side with Brutus and Cassius could easily ally with a political opponent of Octavian if not appeased, and they also required land. There was no more government-controlled land to allot as settlements for their soldiers, so Octavian chose to alienate many Roman citizens by confiscating their land, instead of alienating many Roman soldiers who could mount a considerable opposition against him in the Roman heartland. There were as many as eighteen Roman towns affected by the new settlements, with entire populations driven out or at least given partial evictions.

=== The Perusine War, marriage alliances, and Treaty of Brundisium ===
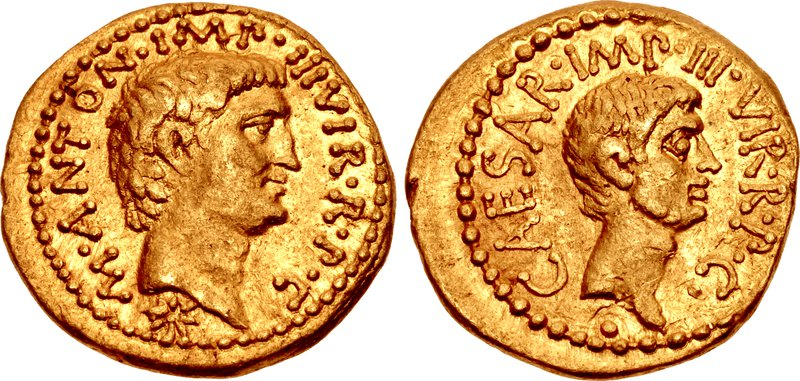
Roman aureus bearing the portraits of Mark Antony (left) and Octavian (right), issued to celebrate their reconciliation in October 40 BC

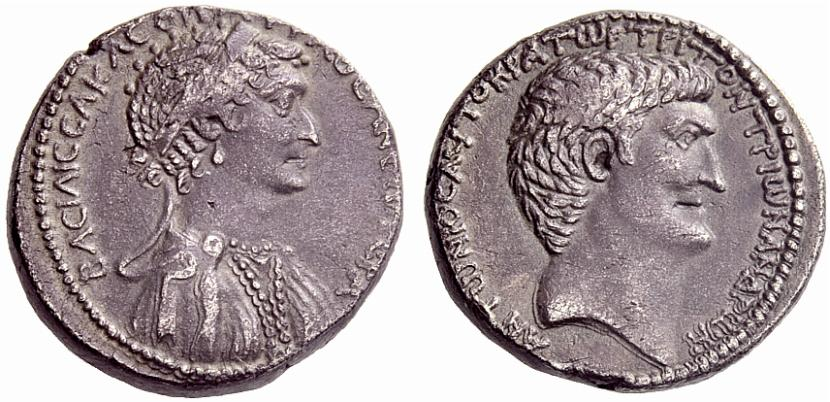
Cleopatra and Mark Antony on the obverse and reverse, respectively, of a silver tetradrachm struck at the mint of Antioch in 36 BC, with Greek legends

There was widespread dissatisfaction with Octavian over these settlements of his soldiers, and this encouraged many to rally at the side of Lucius Antonius, who was brother of Mark Antony and supported by a majority in the Senate. Meanwhile, Octavian asked for a divorce from Claudia, the daughter of Antony's wife Fulvia and her first husband Publius Clodius Pulcher. He returned Claudia to her mother, claiming that their marriage had never been consummated. Fulvia decided to take action. Together with Lucius Antonius, she raised an army in Italy to fight for Antony's rights against Octavian, and Lucius Antonius even briefly took Rome, forcing Lepidus and his two legions to flee the city. Yet Lucius and Fulvia took a political and martial gamble in opposing Octavian, since the Roman army still depended on the triumvirs for their salaries. Lucius and his allies ended up in a defensive siege at Perusia, where Octavian forced them into surrender in February 40 BC.

Lucius and his army were spared because of his kinship with Antony, the strongman of the East, while Fulvia fled in exile to Sicyon in Greece. She died shortly afterwards, with blame for the revolt conveniently placed on her rather than on Lucius. Octavian showed no mercy, however, for the mass of allies loyal to Lucius. On 15 March, the anniversary of Julius Caesar's assassination, he had 300 Roman senators and equestrians executed for allying with Lucius. (Note: Historian Adrian Goldsworthy downplays this event as a potential exaggeration due to rumors and legend preserved in primary sources: "Rumour and hostile propaganda soon turned this into another ghastly massacre, with 300 leading citizens being sacrificed to Julius Caesar’s spirit – an invention no doubt inspired by Achilles' killing of Trojan prisoners at the funeral of his comrade Patroclus in the Iliad. Suetonius claims that pleas for mercy and excuses were met by the young triumvir with a laconic 'He must die' or 'You must die' – moriendum esse in Latin. Yet on the whole reprisals were limited. The rebel soldiers were spared, and many no doubt were recruited into Caesar's legions. Lucius Antonius was not only left unharmed, but was sent to govern one of the Spanish provinces".) Perusia was also pillaged and burned, though it is unclear if Octavian's troops or local inhabitants started the fires. This bloody event sullied Octavian's reputation and was criticized by many, such as Augustan poet Sextus Propertius.

Sextus Pompeius affirmed his control of his powerbase in Sicily as part of an agreement reached with the triumvirate in 40 BC, and gained control of Sardinia and Corsica in 39 BC. Both Antony and Octavian were vying for an alliance with Pompeius. Octavian succeeded in a temporary alliance in 40 BC when he married Scribonia, a sister (or daughter) of Pompeius's father-in-law Lucius Scribonius Libo (hence an aunt of Sextus Pompey's wife). Scribonia gave birth to Octavian's only natural child, Julia, the same day that he divorced her to marry Livia Drusilla, little more than a year after their marriage. When Livia began her affair with Octavian, she was already married to Tiberius Claudius Nero, had a son Tiberius with Nero, and was pregnant with their second child. She gave birth to her second son, Drusus, several months after her divorce from Nero and marriage to Octavian. Livia later had another child with Octavian, who was born prematurely and did not survive.

A Roman bust of Livia, Augustus's third wife, Musée Saint-Raymond, France

While in Egypt, Antony had been engaged in an affair with Cleopatra and had fathered two children with her. Mark Antony's children with Cleopatra were the twins Alexander Helios and Cleopatra Selene II born in 40 BC, and their son Ptolemy Philadelphus born in 36 BC. Antony's Gallic provinces also fell into Octavian's hands after the death of Antony's legate Quintus Fufius Calenus in 40 BC. Aware of his deteriorating relationship with Octavian, Antony left Cleopatra; he sailed to Italy in 40 BC with a large force to oppose Octavian, laying siege to Brundisium. This new conflict proved untenable for both Octavian and Antony, however. Their centurions, who had become important figures politically, refused to fight because of their Caesarian cause, while the legions under their command followed suit. Meanwhile, in Sicyon, Antony's wife Fulvia died of a sudden illness, shortly after Antony met with her. Fulvia's death and the mutiny of their centurions allowed the two remaining triumvirs to effect a reconciliation.

In the autumn of 40, Octavian and Antony approved the Treaty of Brundisium, by which Lepidus would remain in Africa, Antony in the East, Octavian in the West. The Italian Peninsula was left open to all for the recruitment of soldiers, but in reality this provision was useless for Antony in the East. Octavian was in a stronger negotiating position due to the troubles Antony had to face in the east with the Parthians invading Asia Minor. To further cement relations of alliance with Antony, Octavian gave his sister, Octavia Minor, in marriage to Antony in late 40 BC.

=== War with Sextus Pompeius and exile of Lepidus ===
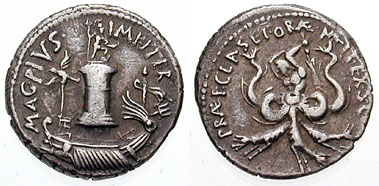
A denarius of Sextus Pompeius, minted for his victory over Octavian's fleet. Obverse: the place where he defeated Octavian, Pharus of Messina decorated with a statue of Neptune; before that galley adorned with aquila, sceptre & trident; MAG. PIVS IMP. ITER. Reverse, the monster Scylla, her torso of dogs and fish tails, wielding a rudder as a club. Caption: PRAEF[ECTUS] CLAS[SIS] ET ORAE MARIT[IMAE] EX S. C.

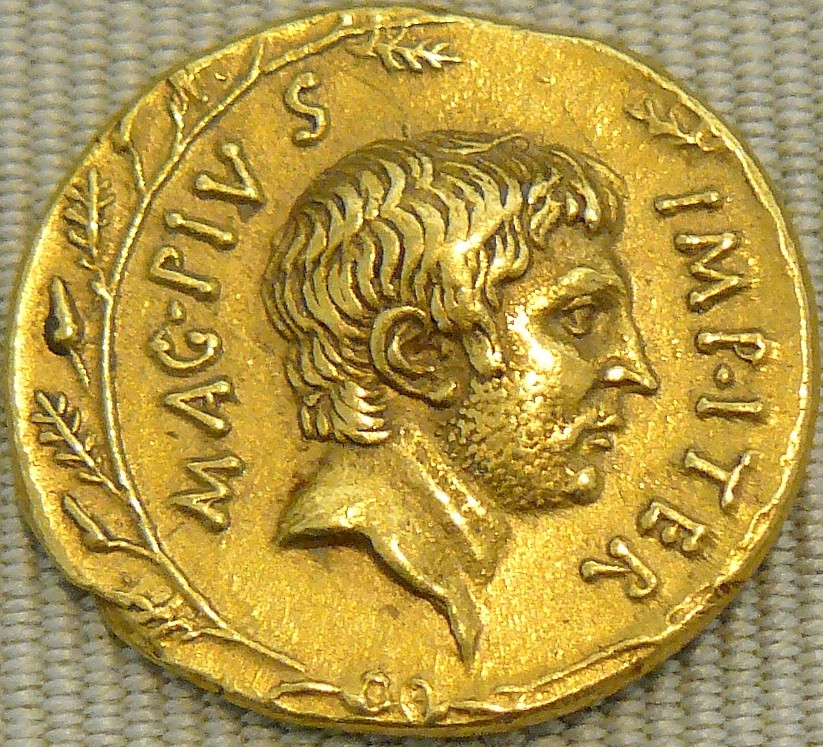
Aureus coin of Sextus Pompey, minted in Roman Sicily in 37 or 36 BC

Sextus Pompeius threatened Octavian in Italy by denying shipments of grain through the Mediterranean Sea to the peninsula. Pompeius's own son was put in charge as naval commander in the effort to cause widespread famine in Italy. Pompeius's control over the sea prompted him to take on the name Neptuni filius ('son of Neptune'). Before the battles of Philippi, Octavian had sent Salvidienus Rufus with a naval force to dislodge Sextus Pompeius from Sicily, but without success, and so the triumvirs recognized his command over the sea with the Treaty of Brundisium in 40 BC. However, when Sextus Pompeius resumed his blockade, a starving angry mob in Rome blamed Octavian and Antony and attacked them in early 39 BC; Antony's forces rescued Octavian and dispersed the mob. Another temporary peace agreement was reached in 39 BC with the Pact of Misenum. The blockade on Italy was lifted once Octavian granted Pompeius Sardinia, Corsica, Sicily, and the Peloponnese, and ensured him a future position in the consulship. Sextus Pompeius was also allowed to join the college of augurs. (Note: According to Patricia Southern, other stipulations of the Treaty of Misenum included Sextus Pompeius's position as consul designate for 38 BC (with Mark Antony assigned as consul for the same year), being allowed to join the college of augurs, and being made responsible for maintaining Rome's grain supply, but that he was not allowed to station any of his troops in Roman Italy. According to Klaus Bringmann, Sextus Pompeius was guaranteed the consulship for 35 BC, and was made responsible for managing the grain supply to Rome. Both Southern and Bringmann relate how various proscribed republican liberatores were given amnesty and allowed to return to Rome. Citing Appian (BCiv 5.73), historian Kathryn Welch states that Sextus Pompeius was consul designate with Octavian for 33 BC. Historian Adrian Goldsworthy agrees the claims about Sicily, Sardinia, Corsica, the Peloponnese, and the college of augurs, but says that "Pompey's son was scheduled to be consul in 33 BC in elections controlled by the triumvirate".)

The territorial agreement between the triumvirate and Sextus Pompeius began to crumble once Octavian divorced Scribonia and married Livia on 17 January 38 BC. After Antony refused to relinquish the Peloponnese, Pompeius blocked Rome's food supply, causing riots there. Pompeius's naval commander Menas betrayed him, handing over three legions to Octavian, as well as Corsica and Sardinia. However, Octavian's naval forces were defeated at Cumae. Octavian lacked the resources to confront Pompeius alone, so an agreement was reached with the triumvirate's extension for another five-year period beginning in 37 BC.

In supporting Octavian, Antony expected to gain support for his own campaign against the Parthian Empire, desiring to avenge Rome's defeat at Carrhae in 53 BC. In an agreement reached at Tarentum in mid-37 BC, Antony provided 120 ships for Octavian to use against Pompeius, while Octavian was to send 20,000 legionaries to Antony for use against Parthia. Two years later Octavian sent only a tenth of those promised, which Antony viewed as an intentional provocation. Meanwhile, Agrippa was tasked with creating the artificial harbor Portus Julius near Cumae by joining the Lucrinus and Avernus lakes for the training and shipbuilding of Octavian's naval fleet.

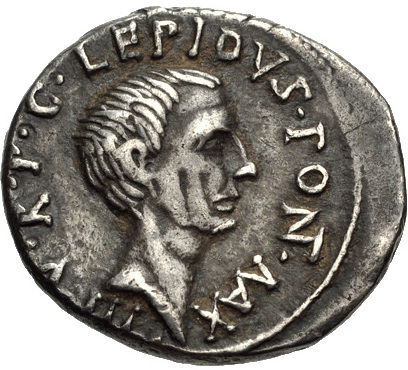
Denarius of 42 BC depicting Marcus Aemilius Lepidus; the inscription reads III v(ir) r(ei) p(ublicae) c(onstituendae) Lepidus pont(ifex) max(imus) ('Triumvir for the regulation of the republic, Lepidus, Pontifex maximus')

Octavian and Lepidus launched a joint operation against Sextus in Sicily in 36 BC. Octavian suffered major setbacks, including the loss of his fleet as he became shipwrecked in Sicily, aided by the sole companion Marcus Valerius Messalla Corvinus. However, the naval fleet of Sextus Pompeius fled the fighting against Agrippa at Mylae in August, and was almost entirely destroyed on 3 September by Agrippa at the naval battle of Naulochus. Sextus fled to the east with his remaining forces, where he was captured and executed in Miletus by Antony or one of his legates in 35 BC.

As Lepidus and Octavian accepted the surrender of Pompeius's troops, Lepidus attempted to claim Sicily for himself, ordering Octavian to leave. Lepidus's troops deserted him, however, and defected to Octavian since they were weary of fighting, enticed by Octavian's promises of money. They were also effectively surrounded by Octavian's forces in Sicily. Lepidus surrendered to Octavian and was permitted to retain the office of pontifex maximus, but was ejected from the Triumvirate and exiled to a villa at Cape Circei in Italy. The Roman dominions were then divided between Octavian in the West and Antony in the East. Octavian ensured Rome's citizens of their rights to property, settled his discharged soldiers outside of Italy, and returned 30,000 slaves to their former Roman owners after they had fled to join Pompeius's army and navy. Octavian had the Senate grant him, his wife Livia, and his sister Octavia tribunician immunity, or sacrosanctitas, in order to ensure the safety of the three once he returned to Rome.

After defeating Pompeius, Octavian's military campaigns in Illyricum from 35 to 33 BC secured the submission of the Iapodes and Dalmatae people (in what is now Croatia). This conflict allowed him to return the military standards previously lost by Aulus Gabinius, which Octavian housed afterwards in the Porticus Octavia. During the first campaign, Octavian destroyed Segesta (modern Siscia) and was wounded by a collapsing siege ramp when he besieged Metulum (along the Kolpa River). These efforts were lauded in the Senate, though Octavian postponed a triumph for his victories, and only later acknowledged the contributions of commanders Agrippa and Statilius Taurus. Nevertheless, both Octavian and Antony's generals celebrated triumphs during the 30s BC. For instance, Statilius Taurus celebrated a triumph in 34 BC and later built Rome's first fully stone amphitheater. Antony's general Publius Ventidius when granted a triumph for defending Roman Syria in 38 BC against the invasion of Pacorus I of Parthia.

=== War with Antony and Cleopatra ===
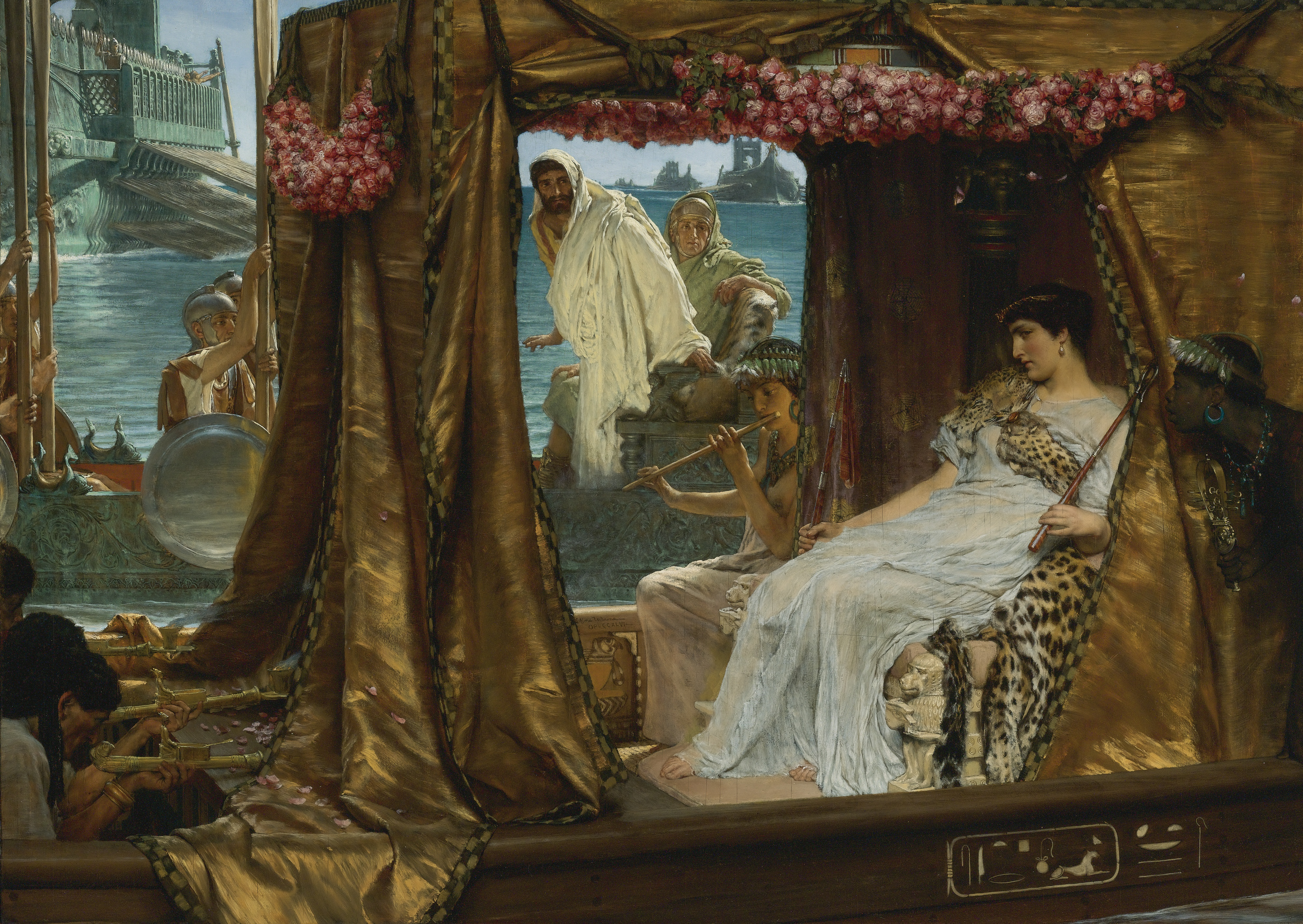
Antony and Cleopatra, by Lawrence Alma-Tadema, painted 1885

In 36 BC, Octavian used a political ploy to make himself look less autocratic and Antony more the villain by proclaiming that the civil wars were coming to an end and that he would step down as triumvir—if only Antony would do the same. Antony refused. Antony's Parthian campaign in 36 BC turned into a debacle, tarnishing his image as a leader. The mere 2,000 legionaries sent by Octavian to Antony, traveling with his wife Octavia, were hardly enough to replenish his lost forces. On the other hand, Cleopatra, with her enormous wealth, could restore his army to full strength. Antony was already engaged in a romantic affair with Cleopatra, their third child Ptolemy Philadelphus born in 36 BC, so in 35 BC he decided to send Octavia back to Rome. Octavian used this to spread propaganda implying that Antony was becoming less than Roman, rejecting his legitimate Roman spouse who he wronged while favoring a foreign queen as his lover.

Roman troops captured the Kingdom of Armenia in 34 BC, and Antony made his son Alexander Helios the ruler of Armenia. Cleopatra assumed the title "Queen of Kings" and her son Caesarion was named King of Kings and co-regent, acts that Octavian used to convince the Senate that Antony had ambitions to diminish the preeminence of Rome. Octavian became consul once again on 1 January 33 BC, and he opened the following session in the Senate with a vehement attack on Antony's grants of titles and territories to his relatives and to his queen, later known as the Donations of Alexandria.

In early 32 BC, amid an intense war of propaganda between him and Octavian, Antony publicly announced the end of his marriage to Octavia. The new consuls Gaius Sosius and Gnaeus Domitius Ahenobarbus were Antonine loyalists who threatened to revoke Octavian's triumviral authority. Southern writes that after consul Gaius Sosius made a speech on 1 January 32 BC denouncing Octavian, a measure brought forth by Sosius was vetoed by the tribune Nonius Balbus. It is unclear what this vetoed legislation contained precisely, but Southern suggests it was likely an attempt to strip Octavian of all his triumviral powers, which had now expired. (Note: Adrian Goldsworthy confirms the same details except he leaves out the name the of tribune Nonius Balbus and does not speculate about the content of the veto like Southern. Karl Galinsky mentions the veto and more definitively states that it was about triumviral powers, but like Goldsworthy he does not name the tribune.) This prompted Octavian to enter the Senate house with armed guards where he made a speech accusing Antony and Sosius of misdeeds, an intimidation tactic that convinced a large portion of the senators and both consuls to flee Rome and defect to Antony.

However, Octavian received two key deserters from Antony in the autumn of 32 BC: Munatius Plancus and Marcus Titius. These defectors gave Octavian the information that he needed to confirm with the Senate all the accusations that he made against Antony. Octavian forcibly entered the temple of the Vestal Virgins and seized Antony's secret will, which he promptly publicized. The will would have given away Roman-conquered territories as kingdoms for his sons to rule and designated Alexandria as the site of a tomb for him and his queen. Octavian demonstrated his loyalty to Rome by building his mausoleum on the Campus Martius. He also contested the clause in Antony's will recognizing Caesarion as the true heir to Julius Caesar. Southern clarifies about the general Roman view regarding Mark Antony's will in the Donations of Alexandria and Octavian's personal views, writing that "the most ignominious clause, from a Roman point of view," was the desire of Antony to be buried next to Cleopatra in Alexandria. However, according to Southern, "the most damaging clause, from Octavian's more personal point of view," was the fact that Antony had named the children he sired with Cleopatra as his heirs, and recognized Caesarion as the true heir to Julius Caesar, not Octavian. Southern asserts that "this sealed Caesarion's death warrant, as far as Octavian was concerned".

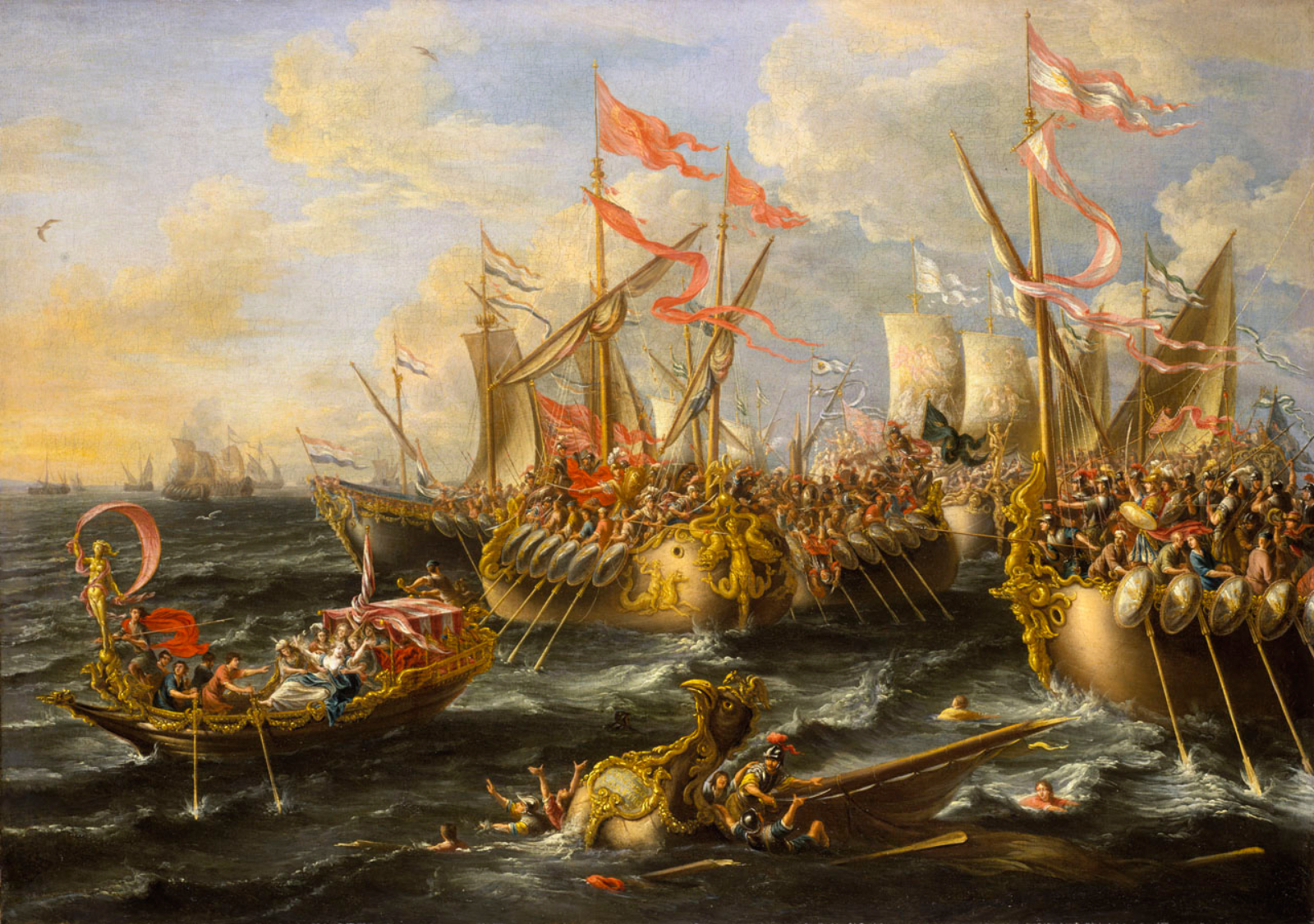
The Battle of Actium, by Laureys a Castro, painted 1672 National Maritime Museum, London

In late 32 BC, the Senate officially revoked Antony's assigned consulship for the following year and declared war on Cleopatra's regime in Egypt. War was declared specifically against Cleopatra and her Ptolemaic Kingdom, not against fellow citizen Mark Antony, which was easier to sell to the Roman people who were wary of further civil wars among Romans, but who could stomach a war against a foreign queen who posed a legitimate threat. Historian Duane W. Roller highlights how the legal grounds for the war were based on the fact that Cleopatra was illicitly arming and supplying troops to a private Roman citizen, Antony, whose triumviral authority had by now technically expired. Following the terms of two suffect consuls for late 32 BC, Octavian had legal standing to conduct the war against Antony by being elected as consul for 31 BC. He retained his authority as a triumvir despite his term having officially expired at the end of 33 BC. He used emergency powers (tumultus) to have men of military age throughout the Republic swear an oath of loyalty to him as a mandate for assuming leadership.

In early 31 BC, Antony and Cleopatra were temporarily stationed in Greece when Octavian gained a preliminary victory: the navy successfully ferried troops across the Adriatic Sea under the command of Agrippa. Agrippa cut off Antony and Cleopatra's main force from their supply routes in the Ionian Sea, while Octavian landed at Toryne in Epirus, opposite the Greek island of Corcyra (modern Corfu), and marched south. Trapped on land and sea, deserters of Antony's army fled to Octavian's side daily while Octavian's forces were comfortable enough to make preparations.

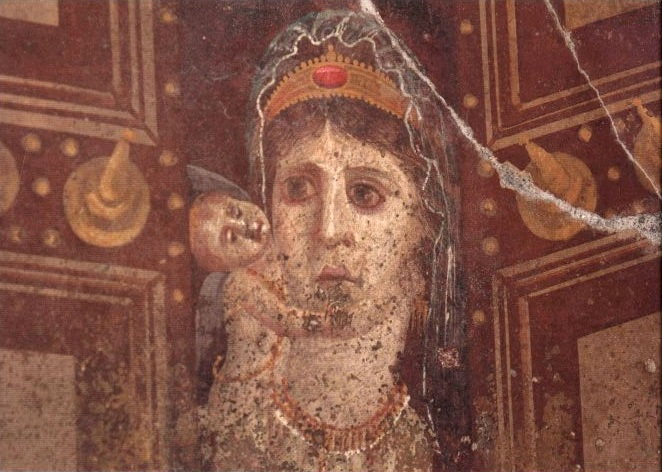
This mid-1st-century BC Roman wall painting in the House of Marcus Fabius Rufus, Pompeii, is most likely a depiction of Cleopatra VII of Ptolemaic Egypt as Venus Genetrix, with her son Caesarion as Cupid, similar in appearance to the now-lost statue of Cleopatra erected by Julius Caesar in the Temple of Venus Genetrix (within the Forum of Caesar). Its owner walled off the room with this painting, most likely in immediate reaction to the execution of Caesarion on orders of Augustus in 30 BC, when artistic depictions of Caesarion would have been considered a sensitive issue for the ruling regime.

Antony's fleet sailed through the bay of Actium along the Ambracian Gulf of western Greece in a desperate attempt to break free of the naval blockade. It was there that Antony's fleet led by Gaius Sosius faced Octavian's fleet under Agrippa in the Battle of Actium on 2 September 31 BC. Cleopatra and her portion of the fleet withdrew early in the battle and were later joined by Antony; his remaining forces were spared in a last-ditch effort by Cleopatra's fleet that had been waiting nearby. All of Antony's nearby forces on land surrendered to Octavian after initially attempting a retreat through Macedonia. After Actium, Octavian returned to Italy in order to settle affairs there with the legions that were formerly under Mark Antony, ensuring that they were not restless or rebellious by sending them on other campaigns or decommissioning them with land pensions and retirement. Within only 30 days after landing at Brundisium, Octavian set out again for the east, traveling first to Greece, then to Syria, and from there marched his forces into Ptolemaic Egypt. Various client rulers siding with Antony now also defected to Octavian, such as Herod the Great of Judea, who met Octavian at Rhodes and would help supply Octavian's forces at Ptolemais in Phoenicia during their march to Egypt. Octavian would later establish a new city—Nicopolis ('victory city')—near the site of the battle at Actium, where games were staged every four years in honor of his victory.

A year later, Octavian defeated their forces in Alexandria on 1 August 30 BC—after which Antony and Cleopatra committed suicide. Antony fell on his own sword and was allegedly taken by his soldiers back to Cleopatra's tomb where he died in her arms. After meeting with Octavian and refusing to be paraded in a triumph at Rome, Cleopatra took her own life by poisoning, contrary to the popular belief that she was bitten by an asp. Octavian had exploited his position as Caesar's heir to further his own political career, and he was well aware of the dangers in allowing another person to do the same. He followed the advice of the Greek philosopher Arius Didymus that there was room in the world for only one Caesar, and therefore ordered Caesarion to be killed. He also had Antony's son Marcus Antonius Antyllus killed, but spared Antony's younger son Iullus and his children by Cleopatra. Octavian had previously shown little mercy to surrendered enemies and acted in ways that had proven unpopular with the Roman people, yet he pardoned many of his opponents after the Battle of Actium. He also ensured that Cleopatra was buried properly next to Antony in their tomb. After Octavia arranged the marriage of Cleopatra's daughter Cleopatra Selene II to Juba II of Numidia, Emperor Augustus appointed this couple as the new co-rulers of Mauretania in 25 BC.

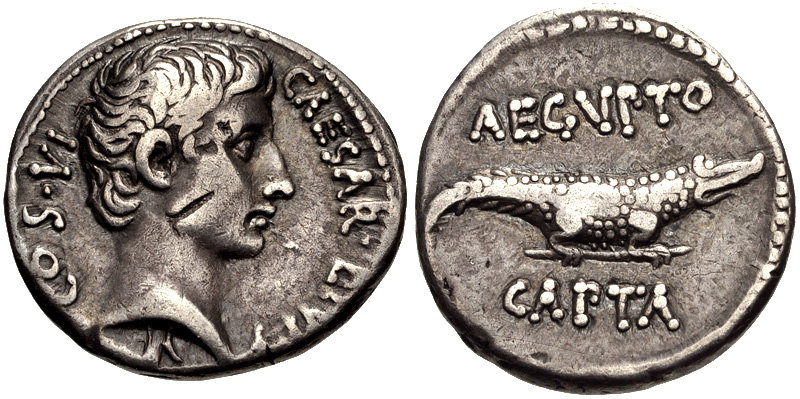
A denarius of Octavian minted in 28 BC at Pergamon, the reverse depicting a Nile crocodile from Egypt and caption that reads AEGVPTO CAPTA ('Egypt conquered')

The conquest of Ptolemaic Egypt relieved all of Octavian's personal financial debts incurred during the civil wars. Octavian controlled Roman Egypt directly, forbade Roman senators to travel there, and appointed equestrian governor Cornelius Gallus to supervise its administration and immensely lucrative taxation. While staying in Alexandria in 30 BC, Octavian visited the tomb of Alexander the Great, the Macedonian king and conqueror he emulated and associated himself with through similarly styled artistic portraits. According to one ancient source, Octavian accidentally knocked off the nose of the body of Alexander in his tomb. Octavian's conquest of Ptolemaic Egypt brought an end to the Hellenistic period initiated by Alexander. It also led to the cultural formation of a Greek East and Latin West across the Mediterranean world and the type of cosmopolitan universal monarchy espoused by Alexander, though one that was now centered on Rome. Octavian would become not only the first Roman emperor as Augustus but also the first Roman pharaoh of Egypt. However, he did not partake in Egyptian coronation rites or worship of the Apis bull, and he never traveled to Egypt again after 30 BC.

== See also ==
- Augustan and Julio-Claudian art
- Augustan literature (ancient Rome)
- Early life of Augustus
- Julio-Claudian dynasty
- Julio-Claudian family tree
- Julius Licinus
- Reign of Augustus
- Temple of Augustus

== Sources ==
=== Ancient sources ===
- Appian. Bella civilia.
  - McGing, B. C. (2020). Appian: Roman History. Loeb Classical Library. Vol. IV–VI. Harvard University Press. ISBN 978-0-674-99647-2.
  - White, Horace (1913–14). Loeb Classical Library – via LacusCurtius.
- Augustus. Res Gestae Divi Augusti.
  - Cooley, Alison E. (2009). Res Gestae Divi Augusti: Text, Translation, and Commentary. Cambridge University Press. ISBN 978-0-521-84152-8.
  - Shipley, Frederick W. (1924). Loeb Classical Library – via LacusCurtius.
- Cicero. Epistulae ad Atticum.
  - Shackleton-Bailey, D. R. (1999). Loeb Classical Library. 4 volumes.
- Dio. Historia Romana.
  - Cary, Earnest (1914–27). Loeb Classical Library – via LacusCurtius.
- Florus. Epitomae.
- Livy. Periochae.
  - Lendering, Jona. (2003). Livius.org.
  - Schlesinger, Alfred C. (1959). Loeb Classical Library.
- Nicolaus Damascenus. Life of Augustus.
  - Toher, Mark (2017). Nicolaus of Damascus: the life of Augustus and the autobiography texts, translations and historical commentary. Cambridge University Press. ISBN 978-1-107-07561-0.
  - Hall, Clayton M. (1923). Northampton – via CSUN.edu. Archived 2007-07-14 at the Wayback Machine.
- Suetonius. Augustus.
  - Wardle, D. (2014). Life of Augustus: Vita divi Augusti. Oxford University Press. ISBN 978-0-19-968645-2.
  - Rolfe, J. C. (1913–14). Loeb Classical Library – via LacusCurtius
- Tacitus. Annales.
  - Woodman, A. J. (2004). The Annals. Indianapolis: Hackett. ISBN 978-0-87220-559-8.
  - Jackson, J. (1931–37). Loeb Classical Library – via LacusCurtius
- Velleius Paterculus. Historia Romana.
  - Woodman, A. J. (2025). Velleius Paterculus. Loeb Classical Library. Harvard University Press.
  - Shipley, Frederick W. (1924). Loeb Classical Library – via LacusCurtius.

=== Modern sources ===
- Bringmann, Klaus (2007) [2002]. A History of the Roman Republic. Translated by Smyth, W. J. Cambridge: Polity. ISBN 978-0-7456-3371-8.
- Burton, Graham (2012). "tributum". Oxford Classical Dictionary. doi:10.1093/acrefore/9780199381135.013.6557.
- Burstein, Stanley M. (2004). The Reign of Cleopatra. Westport, Connecticut: Greenwood Press. ISBN 978-0-313-32527-4.
- Chisholm, Kitty; Ferguson, John (1981). Rome: The Augustan Age; A Source Book. Oxford: Oxford University Press, in association with the Open University Press. ISBN 978-0-19-872108-6.
- Eck, Werner; Takács, Sarolta A. (2003). The Age of Augustus. Translated by Schneider, Deborah Lucas (first ed.). Oxford: Blackwell Publishing. ISBN 0-631-22957-4.
- Eck, Werner; Takács, Sarolta A. (2007) [2003]. The Age of Augustus. Translated by Schneider, Deborah Lucas (second ed.). Oxford: Blackwell Publishing. ISBN 978-1-4051-5149-8.
- Eder, Walter (2005). "Augustus and the Power of Tradition". In Galinsky, Karl (ed.). The Cambridge Companion to the Age of Augustus. Cambridge Companions to the Ancient World. Cambridge and New York: Cambridge University Press. pp. 13–32. ISBN 978-0-521-80796-8.
- Einaudi, Luca (February 2014). "Coins of the Month: The Struggle between Marc Antony and Octavian". Centre for History and Economics, Magdalene College, University of Cambridge.
- Fishwick, Duncan (2004). The Imperial Cult in the Latin West III, Part 3. Leiden: Brill. p. 250. ISBN 978-90-474-1276-2.
- Fratantuono, Lee (2016). The Battle of Actium 31 BC: War for the World. Barnsley: Pen & Sword Military. ISBN 978-1-47384-714-9.
- Galinsky, Karl (2012). Augustus: Introduction to the Life of an Emperor. New York: Cambridge University Press. ISBN 978-0-521-74442-3.
- Golden, Gregory K (2013). Crisis management during the Roman Republic. Cambridge University Press. ISBN 978-1-107-05590-2. OCLC 842919750.
- Goldsworthy, Adrian (2014). Augustus: First Emperor of Rome. New Haven: Yale University Press. ISBN 978-0-300-17827-2.
- Green, Peter (1990). Alexander to Actium: The Historical Evolution of the Hellenistic Age. Hellenistic Culture and Society. Berkeley: University of California Press. ISBN 978-0-520-05611-4.
- Gruen, Erich S. (2005). "Augustus and the Making of the Principate". In Galinsky, Karl (ed.). Cambridge Companion to the Age of Augustus. Cambridge Companions to the Ancient World. Cambridge, MA; New York: Cambridge University Press. pp. 33–52. ISBN 978-0-521-80796-8.
- Hinard, François (1985). Les proscriptions de la Rome républicaine (in French). Ecole française de Rome. ISBN 978-2-7283-0094-5.
- Hurley, Donna (2004). "Livia (Wife of Augustus)". De Imperatoribus Romanis].
- Jones, Prudence J. (2006). Cleopatra: a sourcebook. Norman: University of Oklahoma Press. ISBN 978-0-8061-3741-4.
- Levick, Barbara (2009). "Caesar's Political and Military Legacy to the Roman Emperors". In Griffin, Miriam (ed.). A Companion to Julius Caesar. Oxford: Blackwell. pp. 207–223. ISBN 978-1-4443-0845-7.
- Lindsay, Hugh (2009). Adoption in the Roman World. Cambridge University Press. ISBN 978-0-521-76050-8.
- Mackay, Christopher S. (2004). Ancient Rome: A Military and Political History. Cambridge and New York: Cambridge University Press. ISBN 978-0-521-80918-4.
- Rawson, Elizabeth (1992). "The aftermath of the Ides". In Crook, John; Lintott, Andrew; Rawson, Elizabeth (eds.). The last age of the Roman Republic, 146–43 BC. Cambridge Ancient History. Vol. 9 (2nd ed.). Cambridge University Press. pp. 468–90. ISBN 0-521-85073-8. OCLC 121060.
- Rawson, Elizabeth (1994). "The Aftermath of the Ides". In Crook, John; et al. (eds.). The Last Age of the Roman Republic, 146–43 BC. Cambridge Ancient History. Vol. 9 (2nd ed.). Cambridge and New York: Cambridge University Press. pp. 468–490. ISBN 0-521-85073-8. OCLC 121060.
- Richardson, John Stuart (2012). Augustan Rome, 44 BC to AD 14: the Restoration of the Republic and the Establishment of the Empire. The Edinburgh History of Ancient Rome. Edinburgh University Press. ISBN 978-0-7486-1955-9.
- Roller, Duane W. (2010). Cleopatra: a biography. Oxford and New York: Oxford University Press. ISBN 978-0-19-536553-5.
- Rowell, Henry Thompson (1962). Rome in the Augustan Age. The Centers of Civilization Series. Vol. 5. Norman, Oklahoma: University of Oklahoma Press. ISBN 978-0-8061-0956-5.
- Scott, Kenneth (1933). "The Political Propaganda of 44–30 B.C.". Memoirs of the American Academy in Rome. 11: 7–49. JSTOR 4238573.
- Scullard, H. H. (1982) [1959]. From the Gracchi to Nero: A History of Rome from 133 B.C. to A.D. 68 (5th ed.). London; New York: Routledge. ISBN 978-0-415-02527-0.
- Sear, David (2004-12-31). Roman Coins and Their Values: 4th Edition. London: Spink Books. ISBN 978-1-912667-41-3.
- Shelton, Jo-Ann (1998). As the Romans Did: A Sourcebook in Roman Social History (2nd ed.). Oxford and New York: Oxford University Press. ISBN 978-0195089745.
- Southern, Pat (1998). Augustus. Roman Imperial Biographies (first ed.). London and New York: Routledge. ISBN 978-0-415-16631-7.
- Southern, Pat (2014) [1998]. Augustus. Roman Imperial Biographies (second ed.). London and New York: Routledge. ISBN 978-0-415-62838-9.
- Syme, Ronald (2002) [1st pub. 1939]. The Roman Revolution. Oxford: Oxford University Press. ISBN 978-0-19-280320-7.
- Syme, Ronald (1988). "Clues to testamentary adoption". Roman Papers. Vol. 4. Amsterdam: Gieben. pp. 159–73.
- Tatum, W. Jeffrey (2024). A Noble Ruin: Mark Antony, Civil War, and the Collapse of the Roman Republic. Oxford University Press. ISBN 978-0-19-769490-9.
- Vervaet, Fredrick (2020). "The triumvirate rei publicae constituendae". In Pina Polo, Francisco (ed.). The triumviral period: civil war, political crisis and socioeconomic transformations. Prensas de la Universidad de Zaragoza. ISBN 978-84-1340-096-9.
- Walker, Susan (2008). "Cleopatra in Pompeii?". Papers of the British School at Rome. 76: 35–46. doi:10.1017/S0068246200000404. S2CID 62829223. Archived from the original on 10 March 2018.
- Welch, Kathryn (2002). "Sextus Pompeius and the Res Publica in 42–39". In Powell, Anton; Welch, Kathryn (eds.). Sextus Pompeius. London: Classical Press of Wales. pp. 31–64. ISBN 0715631276.
- Welch, Kathryn (2014). "The lex Pedia of 43 BCE and its aftermath". Hermathena (196/197): 137–162. ISSN 0018-0750. JSTOR 26740133.

Political offices
| Preceded by None | Emperor of the Roman Empire; January 15, 27 BC – August 19, 14 AD | Succeeded by Tiberius |
