= Pact of Misenum =

39 BC treaty ending the blockade of Italy during the Sicilian revolt

The Pact of Misenum was a treaty to end the naval blockade of the Italian Peninsula during the war between the Second Triumvirate and Sextus Pompey. Signed in 39 BC, the triumvirs allowed Sextus Pompeius to retain his control of Sicily and Sardinia and also granted him control of Corsica and the Peloponnese. They also promised him a future augurate and consulship for 33 BC. In exchange, Pompeius agreed to end his blockade of Italy, supply Rome with grain and halt his piracy.

The pact later fell apart when one of the triumvirs, Mark Antony, refused to cede control of Achaea. Pompeius then resumed hostilities against the triumvirs before being defeated in 36 BC at the naval Battle of Naulochus by Marcus Vipsanius Agrippa.

According to Joyce Reynolds, inscriptions at Aphrodisias in Asia Minor are compatible with dating the Treaty of Misenum to the second half of August, 39 BC. Roman authors agree that it was only after this Treaty was signed that the Roman general Publius Ventidius could be sent to Syria and Phoenicia to fight the Parthians, who had taken control of that area during the time of strife among the Roman triumvirs who had succeeded Julius Caesar. Even after that strife was temporarily abated by the Treaty of Brundisium (September 40 BC), there was still trouble from the pirate/commander Sextus Pompey, who, operating out of his base in Sicily, was cutting off essential food supplies from Egypt to Rome, causing considerable distress throughout Italy. The Pact of Misenum brought temporary relief to this distressing situation for Rome, and it was only after this pact was signed that the Roman triumvirs felt that they could dispatch their able general, Publius Ventidius, to Syria to fight the Parthians.

Ventidius therefore arrived in Syria/Phoenicia in the fall of 39 BC, after which Octavian, Mark Antony, and the Roman Senate appointed Herod as king of Judea, so that he could go to join Ventidius in Syria and raise an army from his own countrymen to aid the Romans in their war against the Parthians. The Pact of Misenum, along with the career of Publius Ventidius, is therefore important in dating the appointment of Herod as king of Judea sometime in the fall of 39 BC, not a year earlier (fall 40 BC) as in the old 'consensus' chronology of Emil Schürer. Herod could not have gone to his homeland to raise an army before Ventidius, and his Roman army, were there, in the fall of 39 BC, to aid him in his struggle against the Parthians and their surrogate in Jerusalem, Antigonus. There was no delay of a year between Herod's appointment and his departure for Syria, where he met Ventidius, as maintained by Schürer to maintain his problematic Herodian chronology. Josephus (Ant. 14.387/14.14.5) says that Herod, during his time of meeting with Octavian, Mark Antony, and the Roman Senate, was in Rome only seven days, after which he hurriedly left for Syria/Phoenicia, where he met Ventidius, who was already there (Ant. 14.394/14.15.1). Herod was in a hurry to sail from Rome immediately after his appointment by the Senate, not only to raise an army against his opponent Antigonus, but also to relieve his fiancée Mariamne and his other relatives who were besieged in Masada. Herod's appointment as de jure king by the Roman Senate must have occurred after the Treaty of Misenum (August 39 BC), not a year earlier as maintained by Schürer. The proper dating of the Treaty of Misenum is therefore important, not only in the history of Rome, but also in determining the correct chronology for the history of Judea in the time of Herod the Great.

== See also ==
- Rise of Augustus
