= Proscriptions of the Second Triumvirate =

Political purges in Ancient Rome

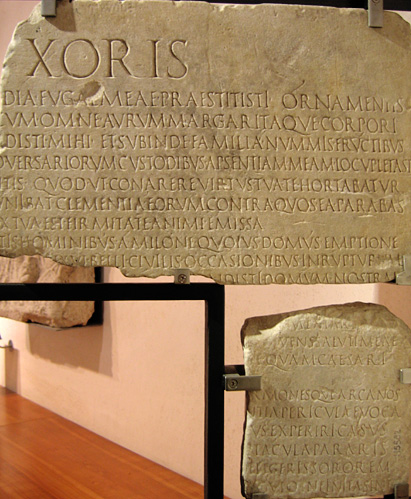
Fragments of the laudatio Turiae, a eulogy for an upper class Roman wife, the latter of whom rescued her husband during the triumviral proscriptions, dated to the last decade of the 1st century BC

The proscriptions of the Second Triumvirate were a series of state-sanctioned political purges launched in 43 BC by Octavian, Mark Antony and Marcus Lepidus. They were intended to avenge the assassination of Julius Caesar, eliminate political rivals, and raise funds through confiscations during the Roman civil wars.

The proscriptions began shortly after the legal formation of the triumvirate. Lists were published naming enemies of the state, including Caesar's assassins such as Marcus Junius Brutus and Cassius, as well as senators, equestrians, wealthy citizens and prominent republicans including Sextus Pompey and Cicero. Rewards of 2,500 drachmae were offered for the heads of free proscribed men and 1,000 drachmae for slaves, while informers received similar payments. Anyone who sheltered a proscribed individual risked being added to the lists. Property belonging to victims was confiscated, although a few individuals were spared execution through the intervention of relatives among the triumvirs, such as Lucius Julius Caesar and Paullus. Many victims were killed, sometimes brutally; among the most famous were Cicero, his brother Quintus Tullius Cicero and Marcus Favonius. Cicero's severed head and hands were displayed on the rostra.

== Scale and victims ==
The proscriptions targeted roughly 300 men declared outlaws, divided broadly between senators and equestrians, while thousands more suffered property confiscation.

Ancient authors give widely differing figures. Hinard reviews the evidence:

- Plutarch provides estimates ranging from about 200, to a bit more than 200, to 300 victims across different works
- Livy lists 130 senators along with many equites;
- Florus gives 140 senators; and
- Appian reports successive lists culminating in 300 senators and around 2,000 equestrians.

The conflict between Appian and Livy may be explained by Appian's figure of 300 senators including those who fled and Livy's figure of 130 senators may have only included those who were killed.

These figures may include all those killed or dispossessed between 43 BC and the treaty of Misenum in 39 BC rather than only formally proscribed individuals. About 160 victims are known by name today.

== Ancient interpretations ==
Contemporary and later Roman historians disagreed about which triumvir bore the greatest responsibility. All sources, however, agree that the proscriptions enabled the triumvirs collectively to eliminate political opponents.

Velleius Paterculus portrayed Octavian as reluctant, blaming Antony and Lepidus for initiating the killings, while Cassius Dio similarly argued that Octavian tried to spare as many victims as possible. Appian, by contrast, maintained that all three leaders shared equal responsibility. Suetonius wrote that Octavian hesitated at first but later pursued enemies with particular determination. Plutarch described the proscriptions as a ruthless and cutthroat swapping of friends and family among Antony, Lepidus, and Octavian. For example, Octavian allowed the proscription of his ally Marcus Tullius Cicero, Antony the proscription of his maternal uncle Lucius Julius Caesar, and Lepidus his brother Lucius Aemilius Paullus, although only Cicero would ultimately be killed as a result of these concessions.

== Finances ==
The proscriptions served financial as well as political purposes with the confiscated wealth paying their troops. Confiscated property provided substantial funds, though still insufficient for wartime needs forcing the triumvirs to raise taxes, including reviving the tributum, a property tax abolished around a century earlier, along with new levies on slaves. They also demanded contributions from wealthy women, though amid their protests the scope of these taxes was reduced from around 1,400 to around 400.

== See also ==
- Rise of Augustus

== Bibliography ==
- Galinsky, Karl (2012). Augustus: Introduction to the Life of an Emperor. New York: Cambridge University Press. ISBN 978-0-521-74442-3.
- Goldsworthy, Adrian (2014). Augustus: First Emperor of Rome. New Haven: Yale University Press. ISBN 978-0-300-17827-2.
- Hinard, François (1985). Les proscriptions de la Rome républicaine (in French). Ecole française de Rome. ISBN 978-2-7283-0094-5.
- Richardson, John Stuart (2012). Augustan Rome, 44 BC to AD 14: the Restoration of the Republic and the Establishment of the Empire. The Edinburgh History of Ancient Rome. Edinburgh University Press. ISBN 978-0-7486-1955-9.
- Scott, Kenneth (1933). "The Political Propaganda of 44–30 B.C.". Memoirs of the American Academy in Rome. 11: 7–49. JSTOR 4238573.
- Scullard, H. H. (1982) [1959]. From the Gracchi to Nero: A History of Rome from 133 B.C. to A.D. 68 (5th ed.). London; New York: Routledge. ISBN 978-0-415-02527-0.
- Southern, Pat (2014) [1998]. Augustus. Roman Imperial Biographies (second ed.). London and New York: Routledge. ISBN 978-0-415-62838-9.
