= Publius Titius =

Tribune of plebs in 43 BC who moved the law forming the Second Triumvirate

Publius Titius was an ancient Roman politician. He served as tribune of the plebs in 43 BC. It was his only recorded office.

During his tribunate, he vetoed honours for Lucius Munatius Plancus. After the Battle of Mutina and the election of Octavian and Quintus Pedius as suffect consuls in August, he secured passage of a bill ejecting one of his fellow tribunes, Publius Servilius Casca (a participant in the assassination of Julius Caesar), from office. On 27 November 43 BC, he carried the lex Titia, which legally established the Triumvirate of Octavian, Antony, and Lepidus for five years.
