= Klaus Bringmann =

German historian, author, and professor (1936–2021)

Klaus Bringmann (28 May 1936 – 14 July 2021) was a German historian, an author of books on Roman history, and a professor of antiquity born in Bad Wildungen.

== Works ==
- Roman history. From the beginnings to late antiquity. Oxford University Press, first Edition, Munich 1995; 10 Edition 2008, ISBN 3-406-44812-7
- Storia romana, Il Mulino, Italian edition, Bologna 1998, ISBN 88-15-06647-0 .
- History of the Roman Republic. From the beginning to Augustus. CH Beck, Munich 2002, ISBN 3-406-49292-4
- A History of the Roman Republic, English Translation, Polity Press, Cambridge 2007, ISBN 0-7456-3371-4 .
- Augustus and the establishment of the Roman Empire, Akademie-Verlag, Berlin 2002, ISBN 3-05-003054-2
- Crisis and the end of the Roman Republic (133–42 BC). Akademie-Verlag, Berlin 2003, ISBN 3-05-003450-5
- Emperor Julian. The last pagan ruler. Scientific Paper Company / Primus Verlag, Darmstadt 2004, ISBN 3-89678-516-8
- Juliano, Herder Editorial, Barcelona 2006, ISBN 84-254-2427-5 .
- Augustus. Scientific Paper Company / Primus Verlag, Darmstadt, 2007, ISBN 3-89678-605-9
- Augusto, Herder Editorial: Barcelona 2008, ISBN 978-84-254-2533-2
- Cicero, Routledge, Darmstadt, 2010
