= Lepidus =

Roman politician and general (89–13/12 BC)

Marcus Aemilius Lepidus
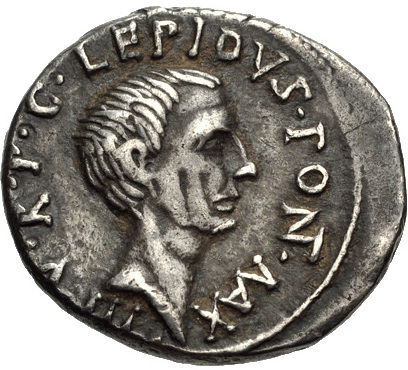
- Denarius of 42 BC depicting Lepidus, aged about 47. The inscription reads III v(ir) r(ei) p(ublicae) c(onstituendae) Lepidus pont(ifex) max(imus), meaning "Triumvir for the regulation of the republic, Lepidus, Pontifex maximus".
- Born: c. 89 BC
- Died: late 13 BC or early 12 BC (aged c. 76); Circeii, Roman Empire
- Office: Interrex (52 BC); Praetor (49–47 BC); Propraetor (47–46 BC); Magister Equitum (46–44 BC); Consul (46, 42 BC); Triumvir (43–36 BC); Pontifex Maximus (44–13/12 BC); Proconsul (43–40 and 38–36 BC)
- Spouse: Junia Secunda
- Children: Marcus Aemilius Lepidus Minor; Quintus Aemilius Lepidus; Aemilia Lepida (possibly)
- Father: Marcus Aemilius Lepidus (consul 78 BC)

Military service
- Years of service: 48–36 BC
- Battles/wars: Battle of Mutina; Perusine War; Bellum Siculum

Marcus Aemilius Lepidus (/ˈlɛpɪdəs/; c. 89 BC – late 13 or early 12 BC) was a Roman general and statesman who formed the Second Triumvirate alongside Octavian and Mark Antony during the final years of the Roman Republic. Lepidus had previously been a close ally of Julius Caesar. He was also the last pontifex maximus before the Roman Empire, and (presumably) the last interrex and magister equitum to hold military command.

Though he was an able military commander and proved a useful partisan of Caesar, Lepidus has always been portrayed as the least influential member of the Triumvirate. He typically appears as a marginalised figure in depictions of the events of the era, most notably in Shakespeare's plays. While some scholars have endorsed this view, others argue that the evidence is insufficient to discount the distorting effects of propaganda by his opponents, principally Cicero and, later, Augustus.

== Family ==
Lepidus was the son of Marcus Aemilius Lepidus (consul in 78 BC); his mother may have been a daughter of Lucius Appuleius Saturninus. His brother was Lucius Aemilius Lepidus Paullus (consul in 50). His father was the first leader of the revived populares faction after the death of Sulla, and led an unsuccessful rebellion against the optimates in 78–77 (he was defeated just outside of Rome and fled to Sardinia where he died in 77).

Lepidus married Junia Secunda, half-sister of Marcus Junius Brutus and sister of Marcus Junius Silanus, Junia Prima and Junia Tertia, Cassius Longinus's wife. Lepidus and Junia Secunda had at least two children, Marcus Aemilius Lepidus the Younger, and a younger son named Quintus Aemilius Lepidus that stayed out of politics and was the father of Manius Aemilius Lepidus, consul in 11 AD.

== Biography ==
=== Ally of Caesar ===
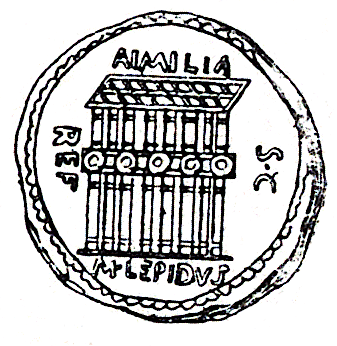
One of the coins minted by Lepidus, celebrating his family's achievements. This depicts the Basilica Aemilia.

Lepidus joined the College of Pontiffs as a child. He started his cursus honorum as triumvir monetalis, overseeing the minting of coins, from c. 62 to 58 BC. Lepidus soon became one of Julius Caesar's greatest supporters. He was appointed as a praetor in 49 BC, being placed in charge of Rome while Caesar defeated Pompey in Greece. He secured Caesar's appointment as dictator, a position that Caesar used to get himself elected as consul, resigning the dictatorship after eleven days. Lepidus was rewarded with the position of propraetor in the Spanish province of Hispania Citerior. Lepidus was also nominated interrex by the Senate in 52, being the last known Roman to hold this office.

In Spain, Lepidus was called upon to quell a rebellion against Quintus Cassius Longinus, governor of neighbouring Hispania Ulterior. Lepidus refused to support Cassius, who had created opposition to Caesar's regime by his corruption and avarice. He negotiated a deal with the rebel leader, the quaestor Marcellus, and helped to defeat an attack by the Mauretanian king Bogud. Cassius and his supporters were allowed to leave and order was restored. Caesar and the Senate were sufficiently impressed by Lepidus's judicious mixture of negotiation and surgical military action that they granted him a triumph.

Lepidus was rewarded with the consulship in 46 after the defeat of the Pompeians in the East. Caesar also made Lepidus magister equitum ("Master of the Horse"), effectively his deputy. Caesar appears to have had greater confidence in Lepidus than in Mark Antony to keep order in Rome, after Antony's inflammatory actions led to disturbances in 47. Lepidus appears to have been genuinely shocked when Antony provocatively offered Caesar a crown at the Lupercalia festival, an act that helped to precipitate the conspiracy to kill Caesar.

When in February 44 Caesar was elected dictator for life by the Senate, he made Lepidus magister equitum for the second time. The brief alliance in power of Caesar and Lepidus came to a sudden end when Caesar was assassinated on 15 March 44 (the Ides of March). Caesar had dined at Lepidus's house the night before his murder. One of the ringleaders of the conspiracy, Gaius Cassius Longinus, had argued for the killing of Lepidus and Mark Antony as well, but Marcus Junius Brutus had overruled him, saying the action was an execution and not a political coup d'état.

=== Aftermath of Caesar's death ===
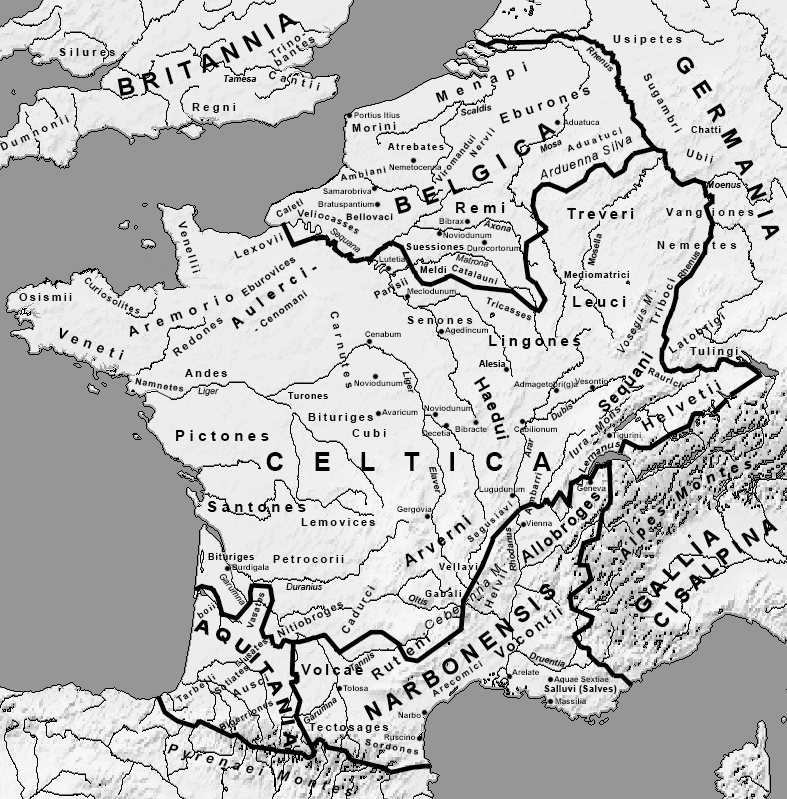
Narbonese Gaul ("Narbonensis") and Cisalpine Gaul ("Gallia Cisalpina"). After Munda, Antony retreated towards Lepidus's territory to join up with him.

As soon as Lepidus learned of Caesar's murder, he acted decisively to maintain order by moving troops to the Campus Martius. He proposed using his army to punish Caesar's killers, but was dissuaded by Antony and Aulus Hirtius. Lepidus and Antony both spoke in the senate the following day, accepting an amnesty for the assassins in return for preservation of their offices and Caesar's reforms. Lepidus also obtained the post of pontifex maximus, succeeding Caesar.

At this point, Pompey's surviving son Sextus Pompey tried to take advantage of the turmoil to threaten Spain. Lepidus was sent to negotiate with him. Lepidus successfully negotiated an agreement with Sextus that maintained the peace. The Senate voted him a public thanksgiving festival. Lepidus thereafter administered both Hispania and Narbonese Gaul as proconsul.

When Antony attempted to take control of Cisalpine Gaul (northern Italy) by force and to displace Decimus Brutus, the Senate, led by Cicero, called on Lepidus to support Brutus – one of Caesar's killers. Lepidus prevaricated, recommending negotiation with Antony. After Antony's defeat at the Battle of Mutina, the Senate sent word that Lepidus' troops were no longer needed. Antony, however, marched towards Lepidus's province with his remaining forces. Lepidus continued to assure the Senate of his loyalty, but engaged in negotiations with Antony. When the two armies met, large portions of Lepidus's forces joined up with Antony. Lepidus negotiated an agreement with him, while claiming to the Senate that he had no choice. It is unclear whether Lepidus' troops forced him to join with Antony, whether that was always Lepidus's plan, or whether he arranged matters to gauge the situation and make the best deal.

=== Second Triumvirate ===
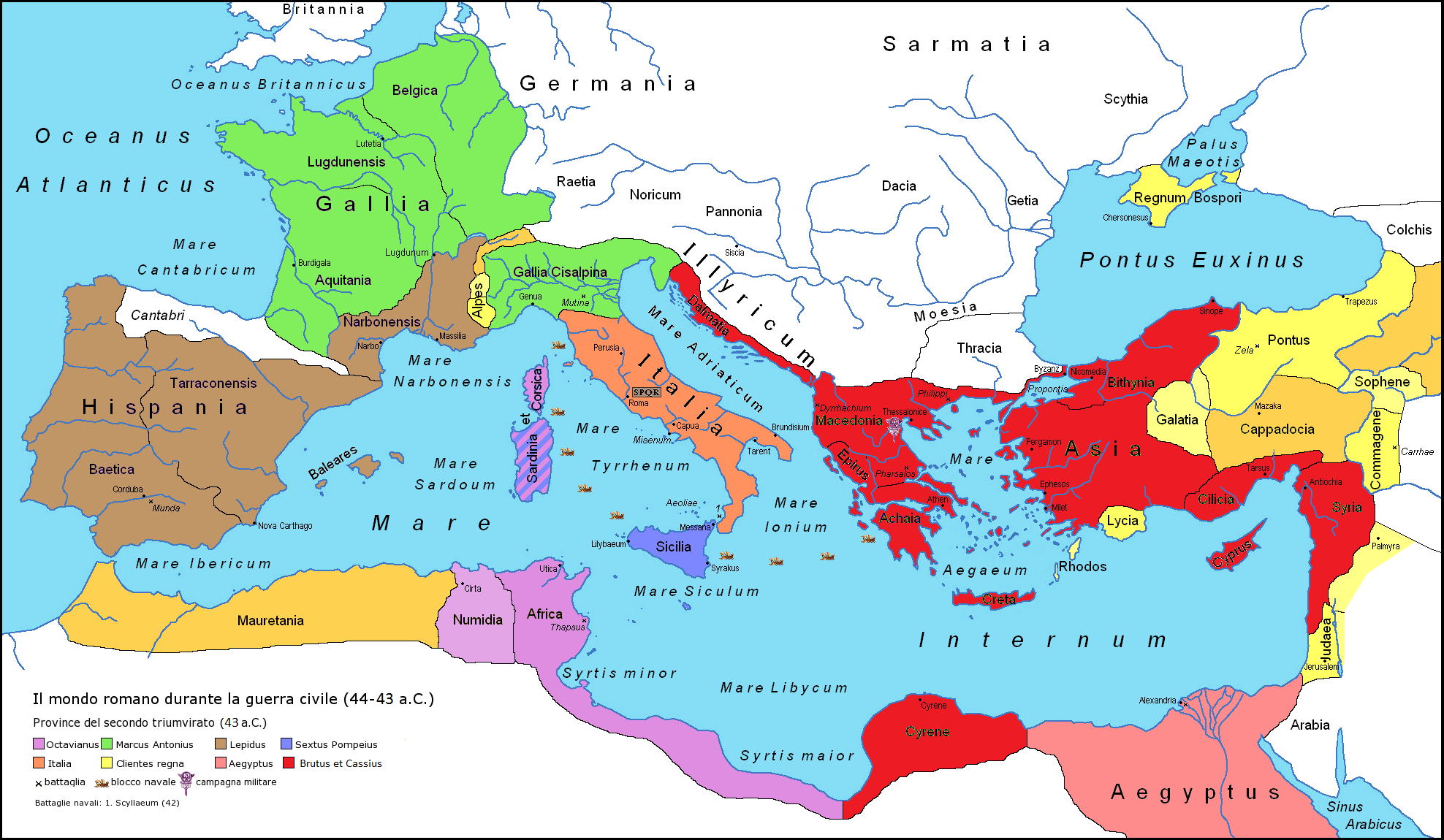

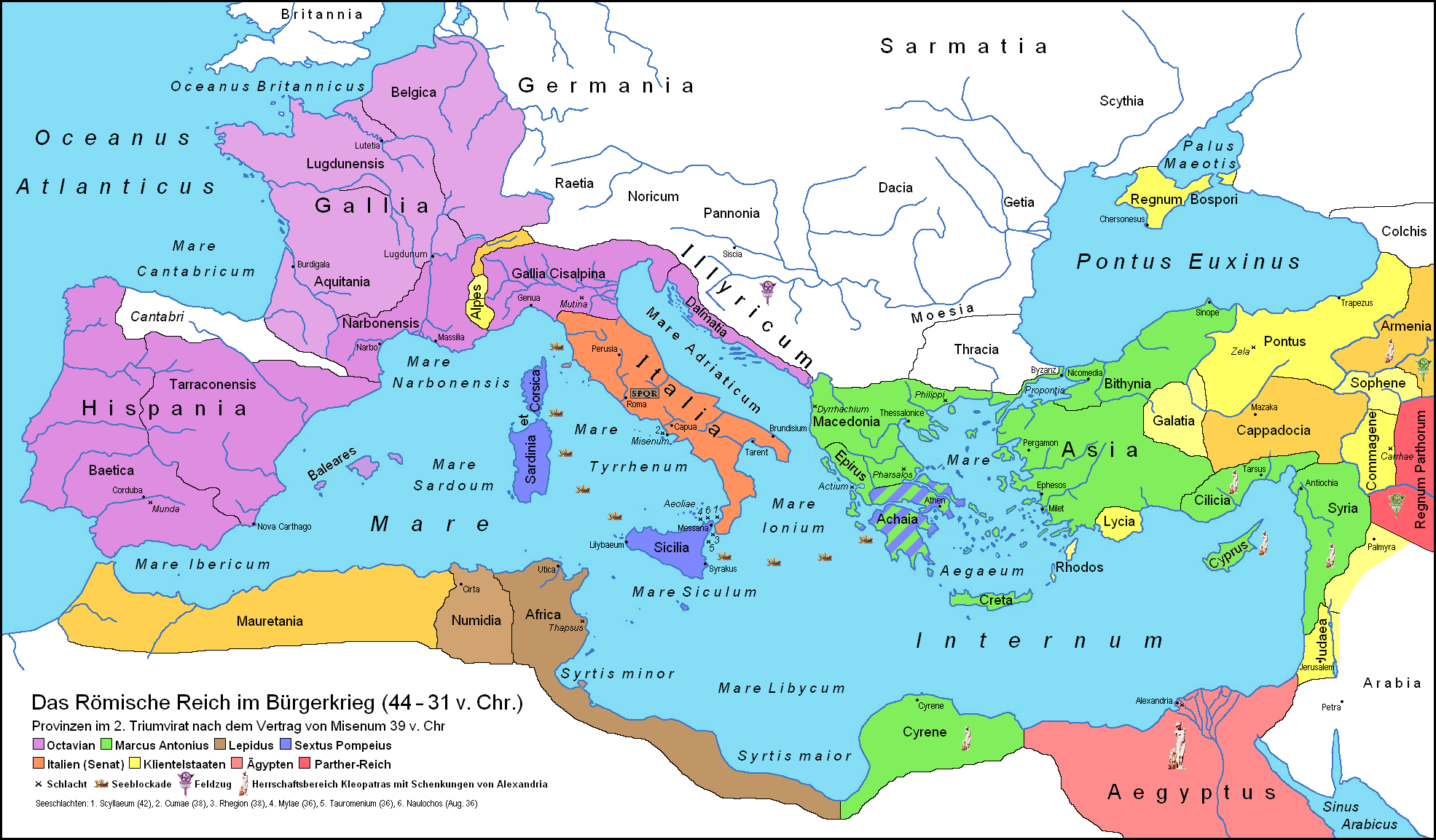
Top: the division of Roman territory on the foundation of the Triumvirate (43 BC).
Bottom: the division of territory after the Battle of Philippi.

Antony
Lepidus
Octavian
Triumvirs collectively

Sextus Pompey
Brutus & Cassius
Rome's client kingdoms
Ptolemaic Egypt

Antony and Lepidus now had to deal with Octavian Caesar, Caesar's great-nephew, who had been adopted by Caesar in Caesar's will. Octavian was the only surviving commander of the forces that had defeated Antony at Mutina (modern Modena). The Senate instructed Octavian to hand over control of the troops to Decimus Brutus, but he refused. Antony and Lepidus met with Octavian on an island in a river, possibly near Mutina, but more likely near Bologna. Their armies lined along opposite banks. They formed the Second Triumvirate, legalized with the name of Triumvirs for Confirming the Republic with Consular Power (Triumviri Rei Publicae Constituendae Consulari Potestate) by the Lex Titia of 43. With the triumvirs in possession of overwhelming numerical superiority, Decimus Brutus' remaining forces melted away, leaving the triumvirs in complete control of the western provinces.

Unlike the First Triumvirate of Caesar, Pompey, and Crassus, this one was formally constituted. In effect, it sidelined the consuls and the Senate and signalled the death of the Republic. The triumvirate's legal lifespan was for five years. At the beginning Lepidus was confirmed in possession of both the provinces of Hispania, along with Narbonese Gaul, but also agreed to hand over seven of his legions to Octavian and Antony to continue the struggle against Brutus and Cassius, who controlled the eastern part of Roman territory. In the event of a defeat, Lepidus' territories would provide a fall-back position. Lepidus was to become consul and was confirmed as Pontifex Maximus. He would assume control of Rome while they were away.

According to Lepidus's biographer Richard D. Weigel, Lepidus' willingness to give up his legions inevitably consigned him to a subsidiary role in the triumvirate.

Lepidus had in fact already reached the peak of his power. By becoming pontifex maximus and triumvir he had gained a level of recognition that would preserve his name and save a very small niche for him in the history of western civilization. However, in agreeing to yield seven of his legions and allow Octavian and Antony the glory of defeating Brutus and Cassius, he had consigned himself to a minor role in the future.

Lepidus also agreed to the proscriptions that led to the death of Cicero and other die-hard opponents of Caesar's faction. Later historians were particularly critical of him for agreeing to the death of his brother Lucius Paullus, a supporter of Cicero. However, Cassius Dio hints that Lepidus helped Paullus to escape.

=== After Philippi ===
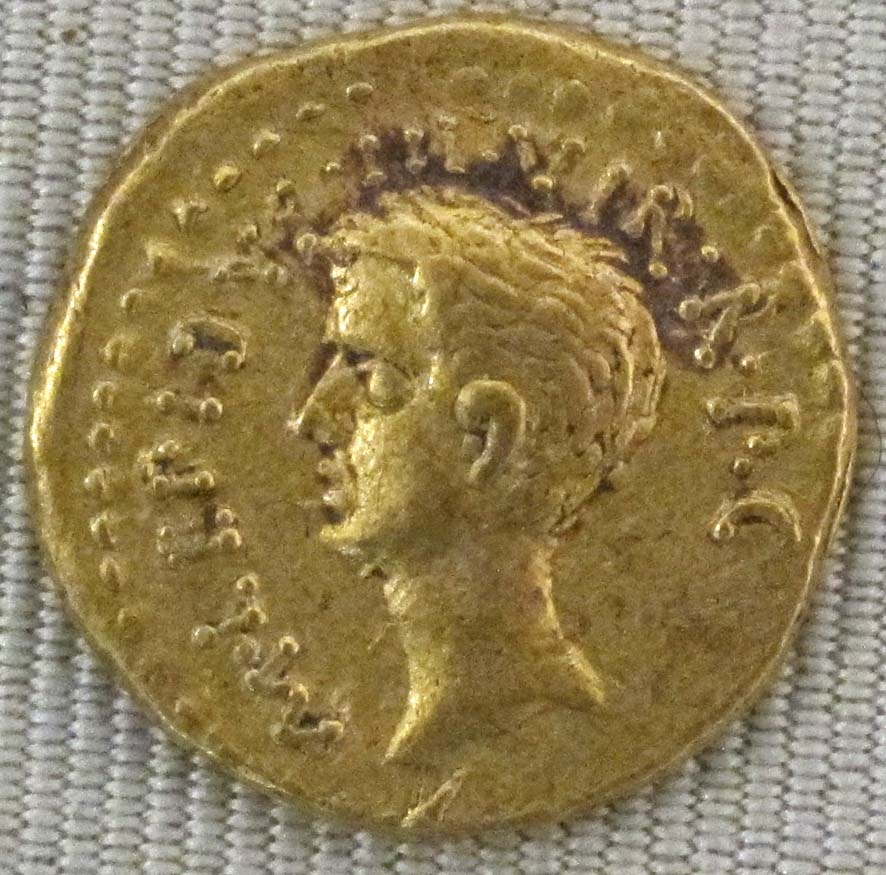
Aureus of Lepidus, c. 42 BC

After the pacification of the east and the defeat of the assassins' faction in the Battle of Philippi, during which he remained in Rome, Antony and Octavian took over most of Lepidus' territories, but granted him rights in the provinces of Numidia and Africa as proconsul. For a while he managed to distance himself from the frequent quarrels between his colleagues Antony and Octavian. When the Perusine War broke out in 41, Octavian tasked Lepidus with the defence of Rome against Lucius Antonius, Mark Antony's brother. Lucius, with superior forces, easily took the city. Lepidus was forced to flee to Octavian's camp. Lucius soon withdrew from Rome and Octavian retook the city. After this event, Lepidus was given six of Antony's legions to govern Africa. In 37 BC the treaty of Tarentum formally renewed the Triumvirate for another five years.

During Lepidus' proconsulship of Africa, he promoted the distribution of land to veterans, possibly in order to build up a network of clients. He appears to have encouraged the Romanisation of Thibilis in Numidia and to have demolished illicit extensions to Carthage. In result, the formally cursed area of the old city, destroyed after the Third Punic War, was not built upon.

=== Fall from power ===
In 36 BC, during the Sicilian revolt, Lepidus raised a large army of 14 legions to help subdue Sextus Pompey. However, this was to lead to an ill-judged political move that gave Octavian the excuse he needed to remove Lepidus from power. After the defeat of Sextus Pompey, Lepidus had stationed his legions in Sicily and a dispute arose over whether he or Octavian had authority on the island. Lepidus had been the first to land troops in Sicily and had captured several of the main towns. However, he felt that Octavian was treating him as a subordinate, instead of an equal. He asserted that Sicily should be absorbed into his sphere of influence. After negotiation, he suggested an alternative: Octavian could have Sicily and Africa, if he agreed to give Lepidus back his old territories in Spain and Gaul, which should legally have been his according to the Lex Titia. Octavian accused Lepidus of attempting to usurp power and fomenting rebellion. Humiliatingly, Lepidus' legions in Sicily defected to Octavian and Lepidus himself was forced to submit to him.

On 22 September 36 BC, Lepidus was stripped of all his offices except that of Pontifex Maximus; Octavian then confined him to Circeii. After the defeat of Antony in 31 BC, Lepidus' son Marcus Aemilius Lepidus Minor became involved in a conspiracy to assassinate Octavian, but the plot was discovered by Gaius Maecenas. The younger Lepidus was executed, but the former triumvir himself was left unmolested. His wife Junia was, however, implicated. Lepidus had to plead with his former enemy Lucius Saenius Balbinus to grant her bail.

Spending the rest of his life in relative obscurity, Lepidus was apparently obliged to return to Rome periodically to participate in Senate business. Octavian, now known as Augustus, is said to have belittled him by always asking for his vote last. Lepidus died peacefully in late 13 BC, upon which Augustus was elected to the position of Pontifex Maximus on 6 March 12 BC; afterwards, the chief priest's office was moved from the Regia to Augustus' palace, located on the Palatine Hill in Rome.

== Reputation ==
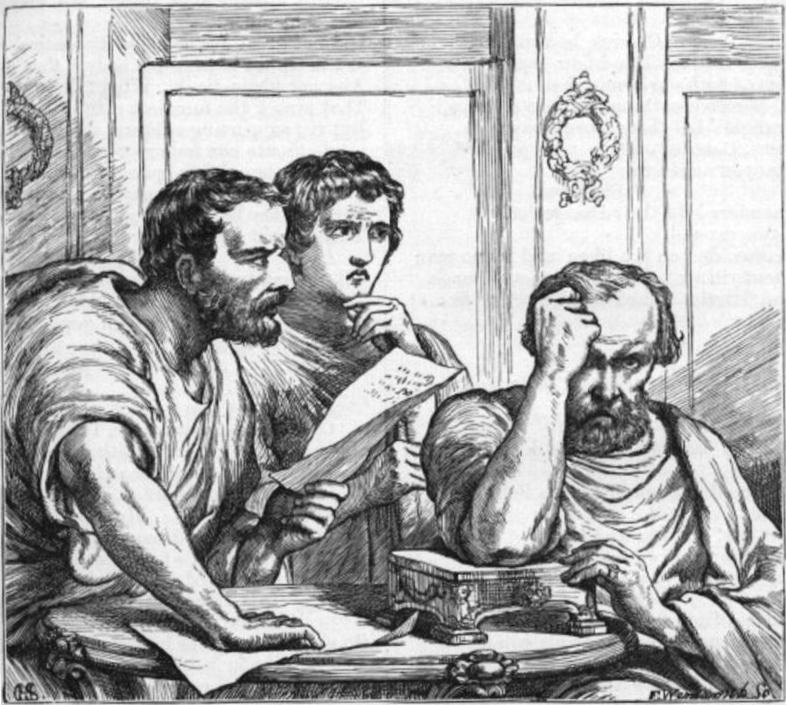
Lepidus (right) browbeaten by Antony and Octavian. Illustration to Shakespeare's Julius Caesar by H. C. Selous.

Lepidus's biographer Richard D. Weigel says that he has been typically caricatured by both ancient and modern historians as "weak, indecisive, fickle, disloyal and incompetent". Cicero condemned Lepidus for "wickedness and sheer folly" after Lepidus allowed his forces to join with Mark Antony's after Antony's initial defeat at the Battle of Mutina. Cicero also privately suggested that Lepidus' wife, Junia, had been unfaithful to him. Decimus Brutus called him a "weathercock", and Velleius Paterculus called him "the most fickle of mankind" and incapable of command. According to Cassius Dio, while Mark Antony and Octavian were away from Rome fighting Brutus and Cassius, Lepidus was nominally in control of the city, but Mark Antony's wife, Fulvia, was the real power. Dio wrote, "She, the mother-in‑law of Octavian and wife of Antony, had no respect for Lepidus because of his slothfulness, and managed affairs herself, so that neither the senate nor the people transacted any business contrary to her pleasure".

Such views are reflected in Shakespeare's portrayal of Lepidus in Julius Caesar in which Antony describes him as "a slight, unmeritable man, / Meet to be sent on errands", comparable to a donkey required to bear burdens. In Antony and Cleopatra he is portrayed as extremely gullible, asking Antony silly questions about Egypt while very drunk. Antony taunts him with an elaborately nonsensical description of a Nile crocodile. After Lepidus's fall from power, he is referred to as the "poor third" and "fool Lepidius".

Modern writers have often been equally dismissive. Ronald Syme called him "a flimsy character...perfidious and despised". Weigel argues that these views are coloured by evidence that was in large part politically motivated, and that Lepidus's career was no more perfidious or inconsistent than that of the other major players in the power struggles at the time. Léonie Hayne says that he acted "skillfully and consistently in support of Antony and (indirectly) of the Caesarian faction". She also argues that his power bid over Sicily was logical and justifiable. Alain Gowing has also argued that his actions in Sicily, though "futile", were no more than an "attempt to regain a position from which he had been unfairly thrust".

== Fictional depictions ==
Despite his role as "a slight, unmeritable man" in Shakespeare's Julius Caesar and as a rambling drunk in Antony and Cleopatra, other Renaissance-era writers portrayed Lepidus in a more positive way. Caspar Brülow's Latin play Caius Julius Caesar depicts Lepidus as Caesar's loyal ally, warning him against conspiracies and later planning revenge on his killers. Georges de Scudéry's La Mort de César portrays him in a similar light, warning Caesar, and later working closely with Antony, who refers to him as "sage et prudent Lépide". In Pierre Corneille's Mort de Pompée his is a non-speaking role, simply presented as one of Caesar's entourage of officers.

Lepidus appears in several 18th-century French plays, such as Prosper Jolyot de Crébillon's Le Triumvirat, ou la mort de Cicéron, in which he attempts to save Cicero's life, and is portrayed as a conflicted figure, who respects traditional Roman values, but is unable to resist the will of his colleagues. Cicero rejects compromise, but Lepidus is too weak to do so. Voltaire's Le Triumvirat refers to Lepidus as a pawn, merely used by Antony and Octavian.

Lepidus appears in a number of novels. He is the principal character of Alfred Duggan's 1958 historical novel Three's Company. As the novel's title implies, it is centered on the second triumvirate, but relates the period through the lens of Lepidus' life and experiences. According to Weigel, he becomes a kind of "a Don Quixote in a toga". The novel follows the standard portrayal of him as "cowardly, stupid, shying away from combat, dominated by women, and longing for someone to give him orders". A reviewer at the time of publication referred to Duggan's Lepidus as "the eternal conservative stuffed shirt without the moral strength to live by the traditional virtues he admires and pretends to possess." He is portrayed as a more competent figure in W. G. Hardy's The Scarlet Mantle and The Bloodied Toga. In Allan Massie's Let the Emperor Speak, he is a weasely politician. He is also mentioned in Robert Harris' Dictator, told from the perspective of Cicero's secretary Tiro.

In the BBC/HBO TV series Rome, Lepidus (Ronan Vibert) is portrayed in the familiar way, as an inadequate rival for the powerhouses of Octavian and Antony. Much of his involvement in the second Triumvirate is barely mentioned in the series. No mention is made of his alliance with Antony and Caesar before the assassination. He is depicted as a general sent to defeat the weakened Antony after Mutina. His whole army immediately defects to his enemy. He appears sporadically as a barely-noticed participant in later discussions about future plans.

Political offices
Preceded by Q. Fufius Calenus; Publius Vatinius	Roman consul 46 BC; With: Julius Caesar	Succeeded by Julius Caesar
Preceded by P. Ventidius Bassus; Gaius Carrinas as suffecti	Roman consul II; 42 BC; With: Lucius Munatius Plancus	Succeeded by Lucius Antonius; P. Servilius Isauricus
Religious titles
Preceded by Julius Caesar	Pontifex maximus 44–13/12 BC	Succeeded by Augustus
