= Karl Galinsky =

American academic (1942–2024)

Gotthard Karl Galinsky (February 7, 1942 – March 9, 2024) was an American academic best known for his research on Ancient Rome.

== Early life ==
Gotthard Karl Galinsky was born on February 7, 1942 in Strasbourg. He finished high school in Germany and then moved to the U.S., where he went to Bowdoin College. He received his B.A. from Bowdoin College in 1963 and his Ph.D. in Classics from Princeton University in 1966. In 2011, he received an honorary Doctor of Philology from the Ruhr-Universität Bochum. Galinsky was the Floyd A. Cailloux Centennial Professor of Classics and Distinguished University Teaching Professor at the University of Texas at Austin.

== Career ==
Galinsky published widely on Roman literature, social and cultural history, art, and religion and was a noted expert on Augustan Rome and the role of memory in Rome. Other interests included the reception of classical themes and heroes (especially Herakles) and the influence of Rome on American popular culture.

Galinsky received many awards for both his teaching and scholarship, including NEH, Alexander von Humboldt, and Guggenheim Fellowships. He was awarded an International Research Prize from the Max Planck Society for 750,000 euros and directed the project Memoria Romana.

Galinsky held visiting appointments in the U.S., Europe, Argentina, and New Zealand and received numerous grants from the National Endowment for the Humanities, including three summer seminars for college and university faculty at the American Academy in Rome, where he was also a Resident in 1973. He was a consultant on academic programs to many institutions, including the South African Ministry of Research after the end of the Apartheid regime. Galinsky regularly taught large introductory courses on Ancient Greece and Rome and on Greece and Rome in Film.

== Death ==
Galinsky died on March 9, 2024, at the age of 82.

== Selected publications ==
- Aeneas, Sicily and Rome. Princeton Univ. Press, 1969.
- The Herakles Theme. Oxford:Blackwell, 1972.
- Ovid's Metamorphoses: an introduction to the basic aspects. Univ. of California Press, 1975.
- Classical and Modern Interactions: postmodern architecture, multiculturalism, decline and other issues. Univ. of Texas Press, 1992.
- Augustan culture: an interpretive introduction. Princeton: Princeton University Press, 1996.
- Ed., The Cambridge Companion to the Age of Augustus. Cambridge University Press, 2005.
- Augustus: introduction to the life of an emperor. Cambridge University Press, 2012. German transl. 2013.
- Ed., Memoria Romana: Memory in Rome and Rome in Memory. Memoirs of the American Academy in Rome suppl. vol. 10. University of Michigan Press, 2014.
- Ed., with K. Lapatin, Cultural Memories in the Roman Empire. Getty Museum Publications, Los Angeles, 2015.
- Ed., Memory in Rome and Early Christianity. Oxford Univ. Press (UK), 2016.
