= Lex Titia =

Ancient Roman law establishing the Second Triumvirate

The lex Titia was a Roman law passed on 27 November 43 BC that established the Triumvirate of Octavian, Mark Antony and Marcus Aemilius Lepidus for five years until the end of 38 BC. The triumvirate established by the law was then renewed in 38 BC. Unlike the so-called First Triumvirate, which was a private arrangement among three men, the Second Triumvirate was a legal instrument which created a formal legal framework to empower the three triumvirs with practically absolute power.

== Passage ==
The law was named for the plebeian tribune, Publius Titius, who introduced it. It was passed before the comitia tributa. This was somewhat irregular: the law created magistrates with consular and praetorian imperium; such magistrates were normally created before the comitia centuriata.

== Contents ==
=== Legal powers ===
The triumvirate which the lex Titia created was largely a "collegial iteration of Sulla's [dictatorship]" and gave the triumvirs enormous legal powers that overrode those of all the other magistrates, both in Rome and the provinces.

The commission, formally titled triumviri rei publicae constituendae ("three-man commission for restoring the constitution of the republic"), first vested the commissioners with consular imperium. It also included a number of other special powers. Like the Decemvirate and the dictatorship of Sulla, the triumvirs had power to issue legally-binding edicts. They were also granted powers to change the rolls of the senate (ius senatus legendi) and establish new Roman colonies. These powers amounted "to the enhanced domestication of the [powers] traditionally used for the foundation and settlement of colonies and colonists".

The law also provided that the triumvirs would exercise their powers sine provacatione (i.e. without appeal to the people). This gave them power over the life and limb of all Roman citizens; they used this authority to engage in the largest proscriptions in Roman history where they killed large numbers of rich citizens and political opponents. With such powers, the triumvirs likely were given lictors holding axes in their fasces and were also authorised to retain armed bodyguards.

Modelled on the lex Valeria which established Sulla's dictatorship, the law also gave the triumvirs the power to divide up provinces by agreement or sortition, appoint magistrates, and award honours. With the provincial authority, they also were given large predicate powers to make war and peace, recruit and deploy soldiers, along with broad financial powers over taxation. Their military authority also was placed beyond those of the ordinary provincial governors with the highest imperium and auspicium. Even when the normal provincial proconsuls won triumphal victories, this overriding imperium and auspicium gave the triumvirs the legal right to reject triumphal honours for proconsuls or to take credit for those victories.

This highest authority was reflected on the Capitoline Fasti, which note the triumvirs above the ordinary consuls. Such authority also gave them the right to sit between the consuls at meetings of the senate and to call the senate to meeting on their own authority. The three men did not alternate fasces – rotate through full authority with the other members taking veto powers – rather, given the Livian and Dionysian narratives on the Decemvirate, refrained from interference with each other. Doing so de facto suspended their mutual ius intercessionis.

=== Term ===
There were two kinds of magistracies in the Roman republic: those with a fixed term and those created for certain causa which would elapse only with the abdication, death, or abrogation of the magistrate. While the law established the magistracy with a term of five years, attaching a causa meant a triumvir's powers ceased only with their voluntary abdication, death, or abrogation. For example, when Lepidus was removed from the triumvirate in 36 BC, this was formally done by abrogation of his office ratified by the senate and people. Octavian clung to the powers ratified in the lex Titia until his "pompous abdication on 13 January 27" BC.

== Legacy ==
While the constitution of the Roman Republic was not dismantled by the lex Titia, it never recovered its free character. It could be argued, however, that in Roman constitutional theory, the law's passage was simply an exercise of the sovereign people's legislative authority. Some scholars argue the creation of the triumvirate marks the end of the republic.

Eventually, over the next two decades and the intervening civil wars, Octavian would emerge triumphant and create the Principate.

== See also ==
- List of Roman laws
- Enabling Act
