= Caninia =

Caninia may refer to:

- Caninia gens, an ancient Roman family
- Caninia (coral), an extinct coral genus in the order Rugosa
