= Aulus Plautius (disambiguation) =

Aulus Plautius may refer to:

- Aulus Plautius, a tribune of plebs in 70 BC, later the legate of Pompey responsible for Sicily in the war against the pirates. Appian refers to him as "Plautius Varus."
- Aulus Plautius, another tribune who read a letter from Ptolemy XII of Egypt before the Senate in 56 BC. Urban praetor in 51, later the governor of Bithynia and Pontus
- Aulus Plautius (suffect consul 1 BC)
- Aulus Plautius, Roman general who conquered Roman Britain
