= Fufia gens =

Ancient Roman family

The gens Fufia was a plebeian family at ancient Rome. The gens does not appear to have been of great antiquity, and only appears in history toward the beginning of the first century BC.

== Origin ==
This gens has been frequently confounded, both in manuscripts and by the earlier scholars, with a Fusia gens, which did not exist, at least during the latter period of the Republic, and is only the ancient form of the name of the Furia gens. The Fufii do not occur in history until the seventh century of the city. The surname Calenus borne by some of this family is probably derived from the town of Cales in Campania. It is not improbable that the whole Fufia gens originally came from Campania.

== Praenomina used ==
The Fufii are known to have used the praenomina Gaius, Quintus, Lucius, and Marcus.

== Branches and cognomina ==
The only cognomens of the Fufii are Calenus and Geminus. The former is probably derived from Cales, a municipium in Campania, but whether the name merely indicated the origin of the family, or whether the first who bore it derived it from having conquered the town of Cales is uncertain, though the latter is the more profitable supposition. The name occurs on a coin of the Fufia gens. Geminus is a common surname meaning "twin."

== Members ==
This list includes abbreviated praenomina. For an explanation of this practice, see filiation.

=== Fufii Caleni ===
- Gaius Fufius Calenus, grandfather of the tribune.
- Quintus Fufius C. f. Calenus is mentioned by Cicero only as one who thought that Scipio Nasica Serapio was the greatest man in the Republic, because he had delivered the state from the obnoxious Tiberius Gracchus. From this sentiment, it may be inferred that Fufius occupied a considerable portion of the public land.
- Quintus Fufius Q. f. C. n. Calenus, tribune of the plebs in BC 61, protected Publius Clodius Pulcher from a trial by special judges, after Clodius had violated the mysteries of the Bona Dea. He was one of Caesar's generals during the Civil War, was consul in 47 BC, and after Caesar's murder joined the party of Marcus Antonius.
- (Fufia) Q. f. Q. n., daughter of the consul Quintus Calenus, and wife of the consul Gaius Pansa.
- Lucius Fufius Calenus, mentioned by Cicero as one of the witnesses against Verres.

=== Fufii Gemini ===
- Fufius Geminus, one of the generals of Octavian, who after subduing the Pannonians in 35 BC, left Fufius in charge of Pannonia. Fufius successfully quelled a revolt of the Pannonians after several battles.
- Gaius Fufius Geminus, perhaps the son or nephew of Octavian's general, was consul suffectus in 2 BC.
- Gaius Fufius C. f. Geminus was consul in AD 29.

=== Others ===
- Lucius Fufius, an orator, and contemporary of Cicero.
- Gaius Fufius, an eques mentioned by Cicero, but otherwise unknown.
- Marcus Fufius, an eques mentioned by Cicero, but otherwise unknown.
- Marcus Fufius, a friend of Titus Annius Milo, who was accompanied by him at the time of the murder of Publius Clodius Pulcher.
- Quintus Fufius, an intimate friend of Cicero, who recommended him in BC 50 to Gaius Mummius.
- Quintus Fufius, an eques mentioned by Cicero, but otherwise unknown.
- Gaius Fufius, a modeller, whose name is known by a statue in burnt clay, discovered near Perugia in 1773. It is two feet high, representing a household god, covered with a dog-skin, and has on its base the inscription, "C. Fufius Finxit."

== See also ==
- List of Roman gentes
