= Lucius Caninius Gallus (tribune 56 BC) =

- Died: 44 BC
- Spouse: Antonia Hybrida Major
- Children: Lucius Caninius Gallus

Lucius Caninius Gallus (died 44 BC) was a Roman politician of the Roman Republic. Gallus was of plebeian status and came from a family of consular rank. Gallus was a contemporary and friend to dictator Gaius Julius Caesar, also to politicians Marcus Terentius Varro and Marcus Tullius Cicero. Gallus was a man of political talent and acquirements.

== Biography ==
Gallus in 59 BC, had accused Quintus Fabius Maximus and Gaius Antonius Hybrida of the Lex Acilia repetundarum, whom Cicero defended the accused. After 58 BC Gallus married Antonia Hybrida Major, the first daughter of Gaius Antonius Hybrida and a paternal cousin to triumvir Mark Antony.

In 56 BC, while tribune of the Roman citizens, Gallus tried to increase the power and influence of Pompey.

Gallus assisted the Greek Ptolemaic Pharaoh Ptolemy XII Auletes of Egypt to reclaim his throne. He forwarded a suggestion that Pompey, accompanied only by two lictors accompany Ptolemy back to Alexandria for Ptolemy to create a reconciliation with the citizens of Egypt. This was about to happen, but never occurred.

In 55 BC, Gallus was accused, probably by Marcus Colonius, for an unknown transgression. At the request of Pompey, Cicero defended him. Gallus travelled to Greece in 51 BC and became a praetor in Achaea, then travelled to Athens, to visit Cicero. During the civil war between Caesar and Pompey, Gallus remained neutral.

Gallus had a son of the same name, who served as a consul with Marcus Vipsanius Agrippa in 37 BC and a grandson of the same name that served as a consul in 2 BC, along with Marcus Plautius Silvanus. The historian Plutarch erroneously refers to the elder Gallus as Canidius.

== See also ==
- Caninia gens
