= Quintus Fabricius =

Roman Senator

Quintus Fabricius (fl. 1st century BC) was a Roman Senator who was appointed suffect consul in 2 BC.

== Biography ==
Quintus Fabricius is suspected to have been either the son or grandson of the Quintus Fabricius who was a Plebeian Tribune in 57 BC.

A long-standing supporter of the party of Augustus, his loyalty was rewarded in 2 BC when the events that led to the banishment of Julia the Elder and the execution of a number of prominent Roman senators saw him granted a suffect consulship on 1 December, replacing Gaius Fufius Geminus, who may also have been caught up in the political crisis. If this was so, then Augustus saw Fabricius as a man whose loyalty was unwavering during this time of crisis.

There is nothing further known about his career, either before or after his suffect consulship.

== Family ==
He was married to a woman named Polla, probably an Antonia.

== See also ==
- List of Roman consuls

== Sources ==
- Syme, Ronald, The Augustan Aristocracy (1986) Clarendon Press.

Political offices
Preceded by Gaius Fufius Geminus as Suffect consul	Suffect Consul of the Roman Empire; 2 BC with Lucius Caninius Gallus	Succeeded by Cossus Cornelius Lentulus Gaetulicus, and Lucius Calpurnius Piso as Ordinary consuls
