= Cossus Cornelius Lentulus Gaetulicus =

Roman senator and general

Cossus Cornelius Lentulus Gaetulicus was a Roman senator and general, who was consul in 1 BC with Lucius Calpurnius Piso the Augur as his colleague.

Originally born Cossus Cornelius Lentulus, Gaetulicus was a member of the patrician Lentulus branch of the Cornelii clan.

Despite giving the appearance of laziness, he was given a number of important commands. After serving as consul in 1 BC alongside Lucius Calpurnius Piso, he was elected proconsul of Africa in 6 AD. Whilst there, he fought a successful campaign against the Gaetuli, which earned him the agnomen Gaetulicus. One of the few individuals trusted by the emperor Tiberius, he was sent to Pannonia in 14 AD to accompany Tiberius' son Drusus in putting down a mutiny of the legions there. Later, he was given the post of praefectus urbi in 33 AD, holding it for a number of years prior to his death.

Gaetulicus had at least two sons, Cossus Cornelius Lentulus and Gnaeus Cornelius Lentulus Gaetulicus, consuls in 25 and 26 AD respectively.

== Sources ==
- Syme, Ronald, The Roman Revolution, Clarendon Press, Oxford, 1939.
- Smith, William, A New Classical Dictionary of Greek and Roman Biography and Mythology (1860)

Political offices
| Preceded by Quintus Fabricius, and Lucius Caninius Gallus as Suffect consuls | Consul of the Roman Empire; 1 BC with Lucius Calpurnius Piso | Succeeded by Aulus Plautius, and Aulus Caecina Severus as Suffect consuls |
