= Quintus Fufius Calenus =

Roman politician and general who was consul in 47 and tribune in 61 BC

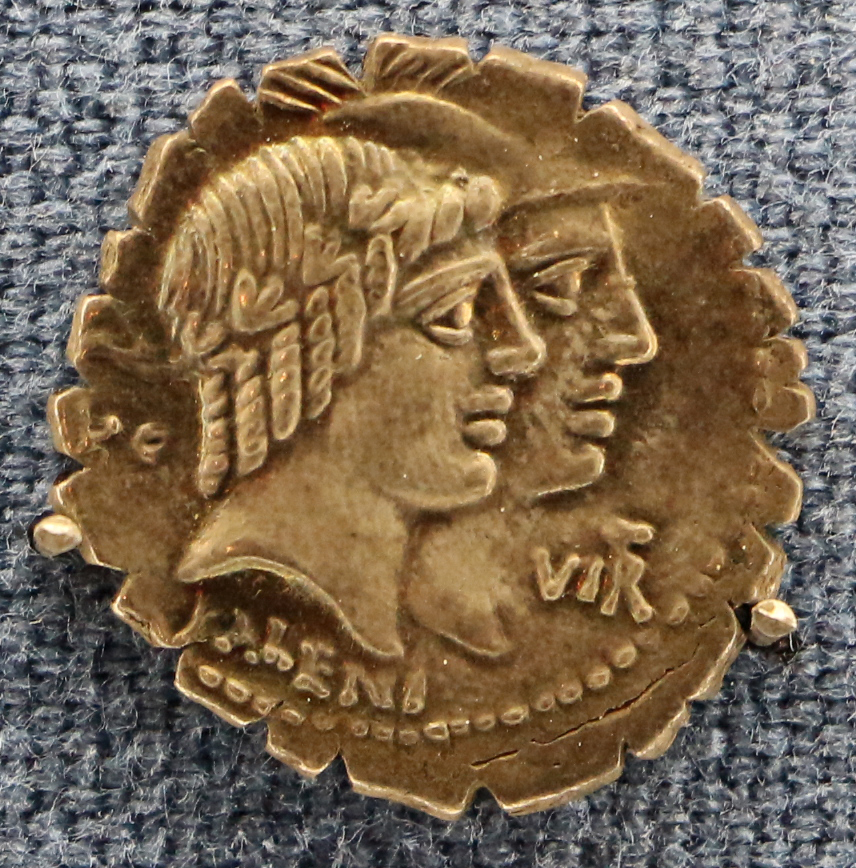
Denarius issued by Calenus and Marcus Cordi in 70 BC.

Quintus Fufius Calenus (died 40 BC) was a Roman Republican politician and general. When Fufius was plebeian tribune in 61 BC he was an ally of Publius Clodius Pulcher during the Bona Dea affair. During his praetorship in 59 BC he supported Julius Caesar who was then consul. Fufius later served under Caesar at the close of the Gallic Wars and during the civil war that followed. For his services he was made consul in 47 BC. After Caesar's death in 44 BC, he supported Mark Antony against Cicero during the ensuing conflict in the senate. As an ally of Antony governing Cisalpine Gaul, he died of illness in 40 BC on the cusp of intervening in the Perusine War.

== Tribunate and praetorship ==
Friedrich Münzer, writing in the Realencyclopädie, argued that the fact that he had an adult son in 47 BC indicates that he entered Roman political life during the years of Cinna's dominatio and that his career stalled during and after Sulla's civil war. Hailing from a family that had some place in Roman politics – Cicero paints his father as having had some influence – Fufius was a homo novus from a gens that had never before held the consulship.

He was plebeian tribune in 61 BC and secured the amendment of a senatorial bill constituting a tribunal to try Publius Clodius Pulcher for profaning the rites of the Bona Dea: the initial bill had a jury appointed by the urban praetor. After a series of political disputes with Quintus Hortensius, Calenus secured a revote in the senate on a divided motion: one to approve the creation of a special tribunal and a second to secure the appointment of jurors by regular order. With the first passing and the second failing, he then brought the enabling legislation that led to Clodius' trial on more favourable terms.

In 59 BC, Calenus was praetor and supported Caesar during the latter's consulship that same year. According to Cassius Dio, he passed legislation to ensure that the three jury panels of the quaestiones perpetuae (senators, equestrians, and tribuni aerarii) reported their votes separately. However, T R S Broughton also notes that juror votes were already reported separately during the trial of Catiline in 65 BC, meaning that Fufius' law may have had little impact.

After his praetorship, little is known of his activities. He was present in Rome in 3–4 April 56 BC, however, as a witness at the trial of Marcus Caelius Rufus. He is also documented at Rome in 52 BC, where in the aftermath of the murder of Clodius by Titus Annius Milo, he moved division of Hortensius' original motion to try Milo in the regular courts under expedited procedure into two parts: expedited procedure and use of the regular courts. This allowed the second part, relating to the regular courts, to be vetoed by two tribunes, Sallust and Titus Plancus Bursa. This paved the way for Milo to be tried in a special tribunal under the lex Pompeia de vi. Asconius notes in his commentaries how Fufius, in both 61 and 52, outmanoeuvred Hortensius with parliamentary procedure.

== Service under Caesar and the triumvirs ==
The next year, Fufius served under Caesar as a legate in the Gallic Wars, taking part in clean-up operations against Uxellodunum. At the outbreak of Caesar's civil war, he joined Caesar and fought in the campaign against the Pompeians in Spain and Massilia. Tasked with bringing reinforcements to Greece with Mark Antony, Fufius was repulsed first by Bibulus' fleet and delayed by enemy occupation of landing sites. Commanding a detachment of troops, Fufius secured the surrender of Delphi, Thebes, and Piraeus without resistance; Athens and Megara were besieged but quickly surrendered after news of Pompey's defeat at Pharsalus arrived. When Caesar followed Pompey to Egypt and became embroiled in the Alexandrian war, Fufius remained in Greece to secure the territory and send reinforcements to Egypt.

For these services, Fufius was awarded the consulship in 47 BC on the dictator's return to Italy. Elections for that year had been irregularly postponed until September and the electoral comitia belatedly returned Fufius and Publius Vatinius as consules ordinarii. After Caesar's assassination in 44 BC and the ensuing military crisis between the senate and Antony, Fufius urged envoys be sent to Antony, earning Cicero's ire in the Fifth Philippic. Dio places an invective speech against Cicero in Fufius' mouth, which according to Münzer may reflect historical positions. Regardless, the senatorial envoys to Antony were unsuccessful and after the death of both consuls at battles of Forum Gallorum and Mutina, Antony was able to consolidate his position among the Caesarian commanders in Gaul and northern Italy. During the proscriptions that followed the senate's defeat in the war, the lex Titia, and the creation of the Second Triumvirate, Fufius interceded to save the life of Marcus Terentius Varro.

Opinions differ as to Calenus' political position in the aftermath of Caesar's death. Per Anna Miączewska, most of the ancient sources paint him as a "sensible and agreeable politician who supported peace" during the Mutina crisis. Most scholars believe Fufius was and early supporter of and instrumental in consolidating support behind Antony in the aftermath of the assassination. It is not clear, however, to what extent that Fufius' attempts to keep the peace by supporting negotiation rather than aggressive action against Antony, as Cicero desired, were part of a conspiracy with Antony.

During the ensuing war against the tyrannicides, Antony placed Fufius in command of two legions to defend Italy. In 41 BC he assumed a governorship of Transalpine Gaul and Hispania Citerior at the head of 11 legions. During the Perusine War, he wanted to intervene with his forces in favour of Lucius Antonius (Mark Antony's brother) against Octavian, but before he could set out he died of illness in 40 BC. His homonymous son handed over the legions to Octavian.

== Family ==
Fufius had two children, a daughter called Fufia who was the wife of Gaius Vibius Pansa Caetronianus (consul in 43 BC) and a homonymous son. It is possible that the Lucius Calenus noted in Cicero's Verrines was the brother of this Fufius, or otherwise this Fufius' son.

== Bibliography ==
- Badian, Ernst (2012). "Fufius Calenus, Quintus". Oxford Classical Dictionary. Oxford University Press. doi:10.1093/acrefore/9780199381135.013.2738. ISBN 978-0-19-938113-5.
- Broughton, Thomas Robert Shannon (1952). The magistrates of the Roman republic. Vol. 2. New York: American Philological Association.
- Miączewska, Anna B (2014). "Quintus Fufius Calenus: a forgotten career". Hermathena (196/197): 163–204. ISSN 0018-0750. JSTOR 26740134.
- Münzer, Fredrich (1910). "Fufius 10" . Realencyclopädie der classischen Altertumswissenschaft (in German). Vol. VII, 1. Stuttgart: Butcher. cols. 204–7 – via Wikisource.
- Ramsey, John T (2016). "How and why was Pompey Made Sole Consul in 52 BC?". Historia: Zeitschrift für Alte Geschichte. 65 (3): 298–324. doi:10.25162/historia-2016-0017. ISSN 0018-2311. JSTOR 45019234. S2CID 252459421.
- Zmeskal, Klaus (2009). Adfinitas (in German). Vol. 1. Passau: Verlag Karl Stutz. ISBN 978-3-88849-304-1.

Political offices
Preceded by Gaius Julius Caesar and Publius Servilius Vatia Isauricus	Consul of the Roman Republic with Publius Vatinius; 47 BC	Succeeded by Gaius Julius Caesar and Marcus Aemilius Lepidus
