= Geminia gens =

The gens Geminia was a plebeian family at Rome. The only member of this gens to hold any of the higher offices of the Roman state under the Republic was Gaius Geminius, praetor in 92 BC.

== Origin ==
The nomen Geminius is derived from the common surname Geminus, meaning a "twin", from which it may be inferred that the family took its name from one of twin brothers. The family may have originated at Tusculum, where Mettius Geminius was a cavalry commander in BC 340.

== Members ==
- Mettius Geminius, (Note: Or Mettius Geminus; it is not certain whether Mettius was his praenomen or his nomen gentilicium.) commander of the Tusculan cavalry during the last war between Rome and the Latin League. He challenged Titus Manlius, son of the consul Titus Manlius Torquatus, to single combat, but was slain by the young man; but Manlius did not live to savor his victory, as he was put to death by his own father for disobeying his orders, and quitting his post to fight the enemy.
- Gaius Geminius was praetor in Macedonia in 92 BC. He was badly defeated by the Maedians, a Thracian tribe, who then invaded his province.
- Geminius, an enemy of Gaius Marius, was a decurion from Tarracina. In 88 BC, he dispatched a troop of horsemen to search for Marius in the marshes of Minturnae, where they found and apprehended him.
- Geminius, a partisan of Marcus Antonius, was sent to Athens in the winter of 32 to 31 BC to persuade Antonius to cast off Cleopatra; but his mission was a failure, as he was unable to meet privately with Antonius, and was threatened by Cleopatra.
- Geminius, an eques who was put to death at the end of AD 33, on the pretext that he was conspiring against Tiberius, although in fact he was killed because of his association with Sejanus.

== See also ==
- List of Roman gentes

== Bibliography ==
- Titus Livius (Livy), Ab Urbe Condita (History of Rome).
- Valerius Maximus, Factorum ac Dictorum Memorabilium (Memorable Facts and Sayings).
- Publius Cornelius Tacitus, Annales.
- Plutarchus, Lives of the Noble Greeks and Romans.
- Julius Obsequens, Liber de Prodigiis (The Book of Prodigies).
- Dictionary of Greek and Roman Biography and Mythology, William Smith, ed., Little, Brown and Company, Boston (1849).
- George Davis Chase, "The Origin of Roman Praenomina", in Harvard Studies in Classical Philology, vol. VIII (1897).
