= Lucius Caninius Gallus (consul 2 BC) =

Roman senator and consul

Suffect Consul of the Roman Empire
- In office 2 BC – 2 BC Serving with Augustus (briefly)
- Preceded by: Marcus Plautius Silvanus
- Succeeded by: Gaius Fufius Geminus

Personal details
- Born: Unknown Tusculum, Roman Republic
- Died: After AD 36
- Children: Caninia Galla
- Occupation: Senator, magistrate, religious official
- Known for: Co-author of the Lex Fufia Caninia

Lucius Caninius Gallus (fl. late 1st century BC – early 1st century AD) was a Roman senator who was appointed suffect consul in 2 BC.

== Biography ==
Caninius Gallus was a member of the Plebeian gens Caninia. Originally from Tusculum, he was either the son or grandson of Lucius Caninius Gallus, the consul of 37 BC. The stemma provided by an inscription commemorating his daughter, Caninia Galla, strongly suggests that he is the son rather than grandson of the consul of 37, pace Syme.

Gallus was triumvir monetalis in 12 BC. His praetorian career is unknown, although it is speculated that he was an aedile at Tusculum at some point.

In early 2 BC Gallus was appointed consul suffectus, replacing Marcus Plautius Silvanus, and he had the emperor Augustus as his consular colleague for a period of time before Augustus relinquished the consulship in that year. This indicates that Gallus was held in some esteem by the ruling regime. He was the co-author of the Lex Fufia Caninia (along with his new co-consul Gaius Fufius Geminus), which restricted the manumission of slaves.

Possibly around AD 9/10, Gallus was appointed the proconsular governor of Africa. Under the following emperor, Tiberius, he was the president of the curatores alvei Tiberis et riparum et cloacarum urbis (or officials responsible for maintaining the banks of the Tiber River and the sewers of the city of Rome).

Gallus was a member of the college of quindecimviri sacris faciundis. In AD 32 he asked the senate to vote on a resolution about including a new collection of Sibylline oracles in the state's official collection of Sibylline Books. Although the senate agreed, the emperor Tiberius rebuked Caninius Gallus for being rash and not following correct religious procedures, and the matter was referred to the full college of the quindecimviri sacris faciundis.

Gallus was also a member of the college of the Arval Brethren, becoming magister of the college by AD 36.

== Sources ==
- Corpus Inscriptionum Latinarum, Volume VI
- Roman Imperial Coinage, Volume I, edd. C.H.V. Sutherland and R.A.G. Carson, rev. 1984.
- Syme, Ronald, The Augustan Aristocracy (1986). Clarendon Press.

Political offices
Preceded by M. Plautius Silvanus	Consul of the Roman Empire; 2 BC (suffect) with Imp. Caesar Augustus XIII; Gaius Fufius Geminus; Quintus Fabricius	Succeeded by Cossus Cornelius Lentulus Gaetulicus; L. Calpurnius Piso
