= Tusculum =

Ancient city in Italy

- Tusculo (Italian)
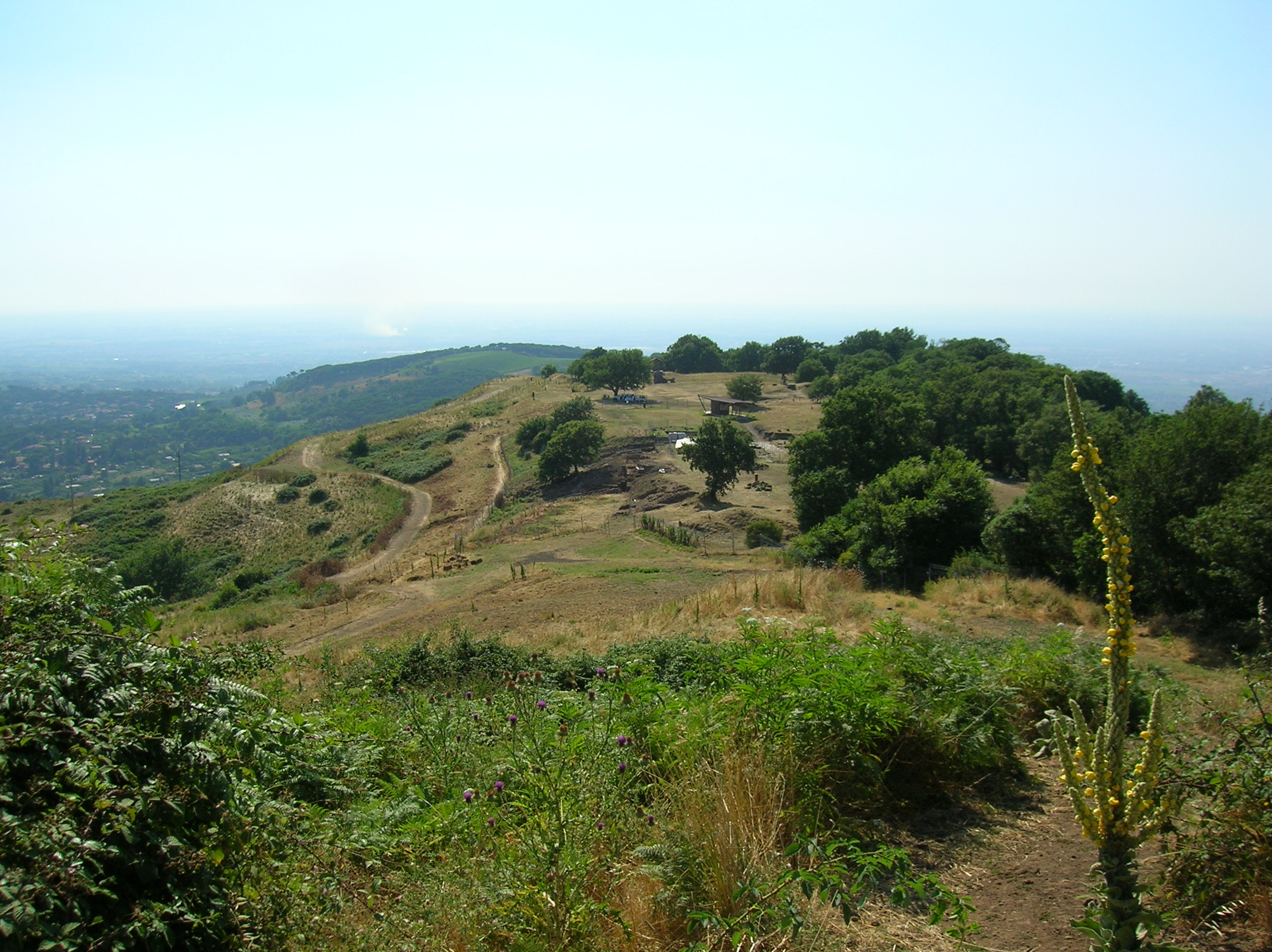
- Archaeological park of Tusculum

- Location within Italy
- 41°47′54″N 12°42′39″E
- Type: Settlement
- Periods: Ancient Roman to High Medieval
- Location: Frascati, Province of Rome, Lazio, Italy
- Region: Latium

History
- Abandoned: 1191 AD

Tusculum, later Tuscolo, was a city founded by the ancient Romans in the Alban Hills, in the Latium region of Italy, about 3 km southeast of modern Frascati. Under the Roman Empire, Tusculum was known for its many great and luxurious patrician country villas close to Rome, notably the villas of Cicero and Lucullus. From the 10th to the 12th century, it was ruled by the Counts of Tusculum. The city was largely abandoned in 1167 and razed in 1191.

== Location ==
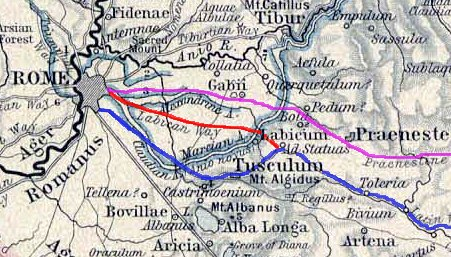
Via Labicana (red) via Latina (blue) roads from Rome

Tusculum is located on Mount Tusculum on the northern rim of the Alban volcano crater.

The summit of the hill is 670 m (2,200 ft) above sea level and affords a view of the Roman Campagna, with Rome lying 25 km (16 mi) to the north-west. It had a strategic position controlling the route from the territory of the Aequi and the Volsci to Rome which was important in earlier times.

Later Rome was reached by the Via Latina (from which a branch road ascended to Tusculum, while the main road passed through the valley to the south of it), or by the Via Labicana to the north.

Most of the ancient city and the acropolis and amphitheatre have not yet been excavated archaeologically.

== History ==
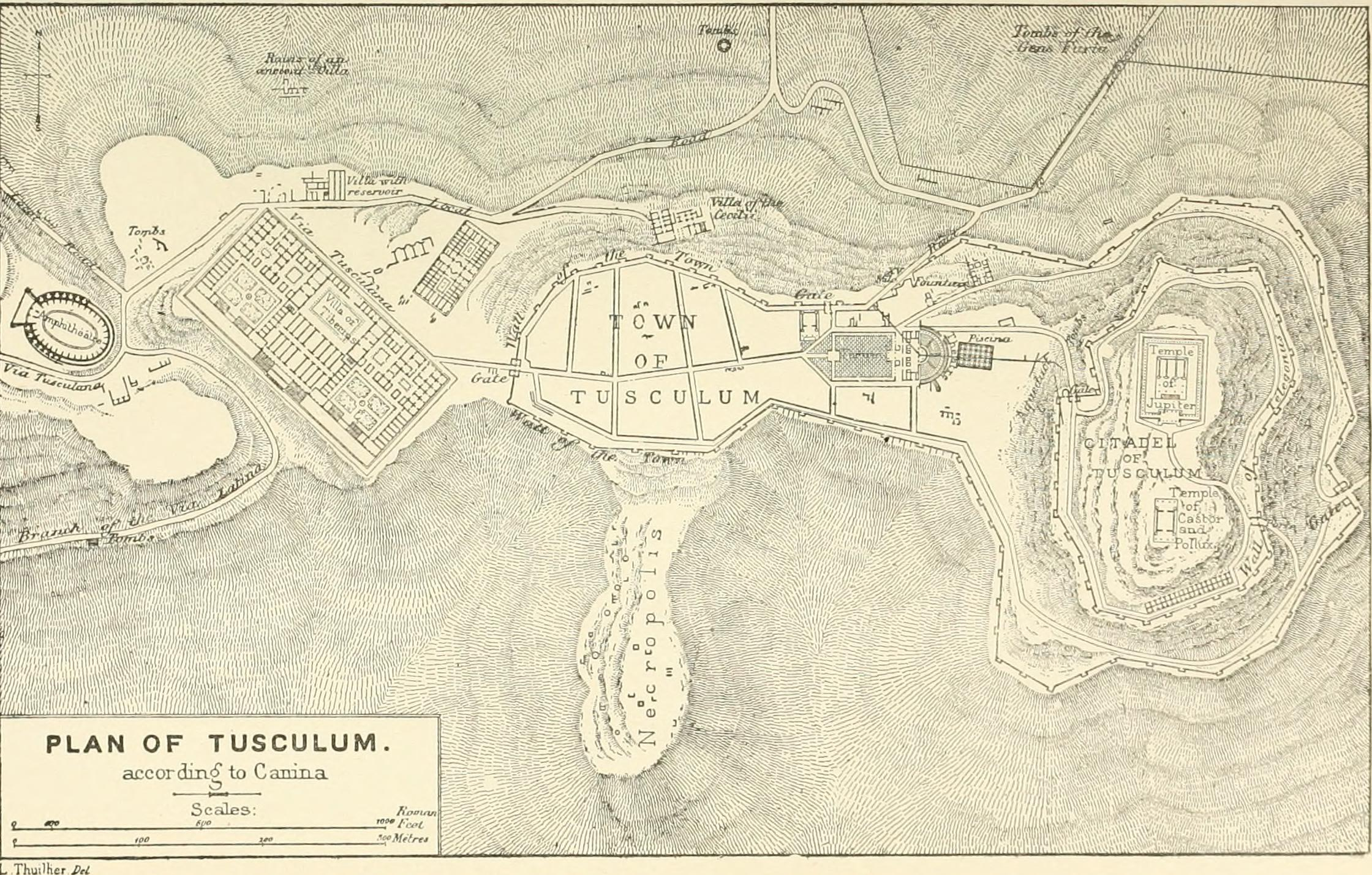
Hypothetical plan of Roman Tusculum (published 1883)

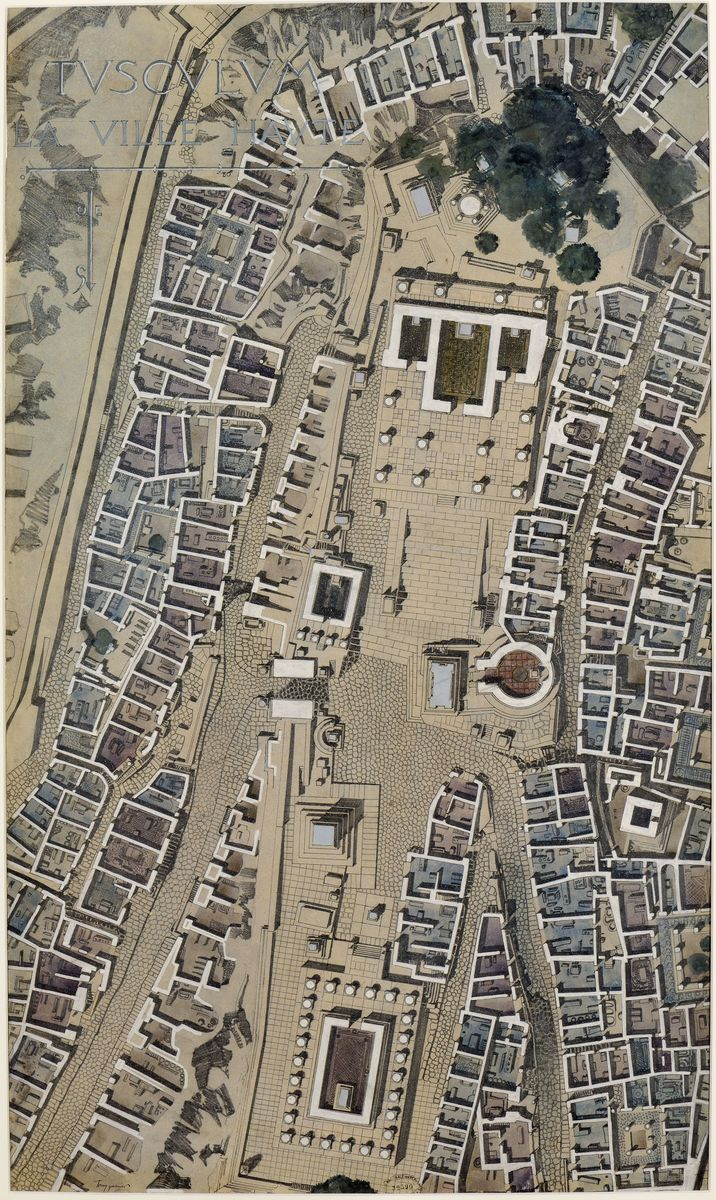
Model of upper town (1904)

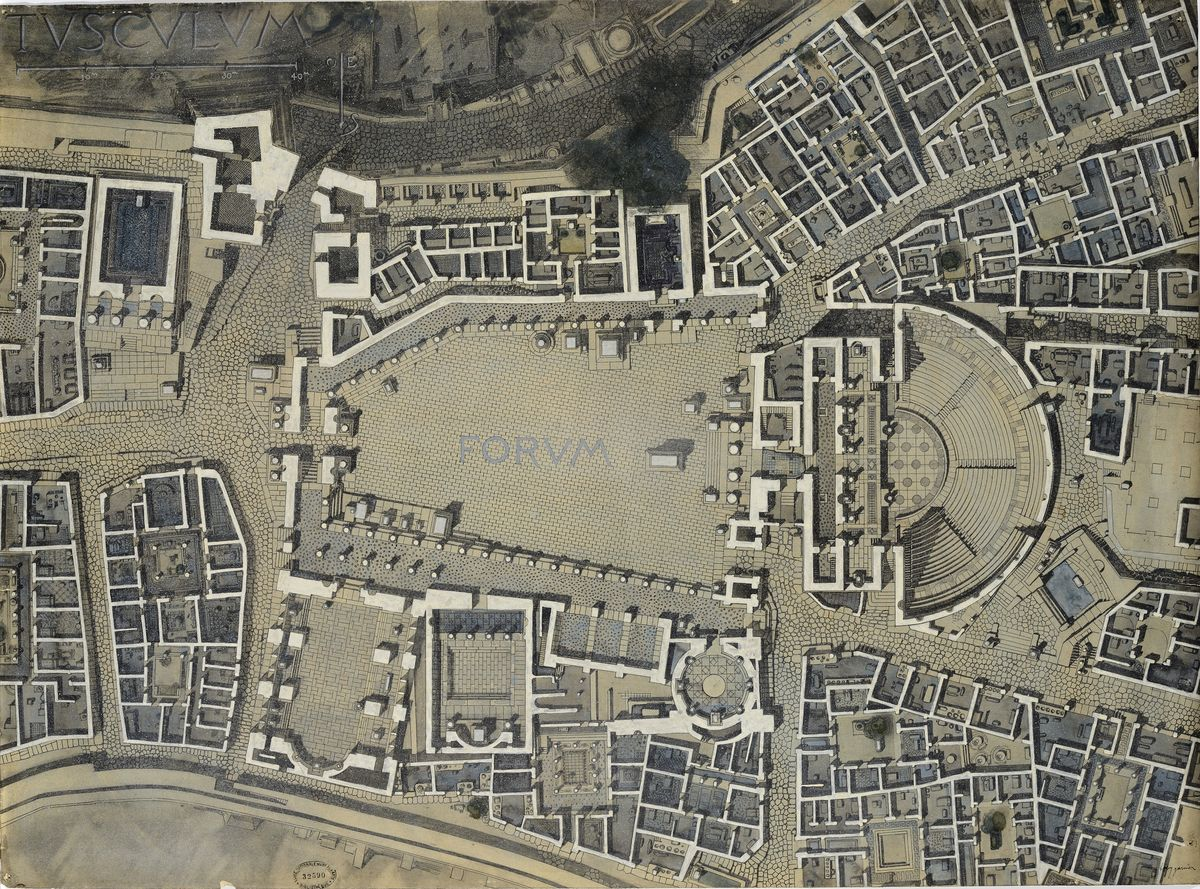
Model of lower town (1904)

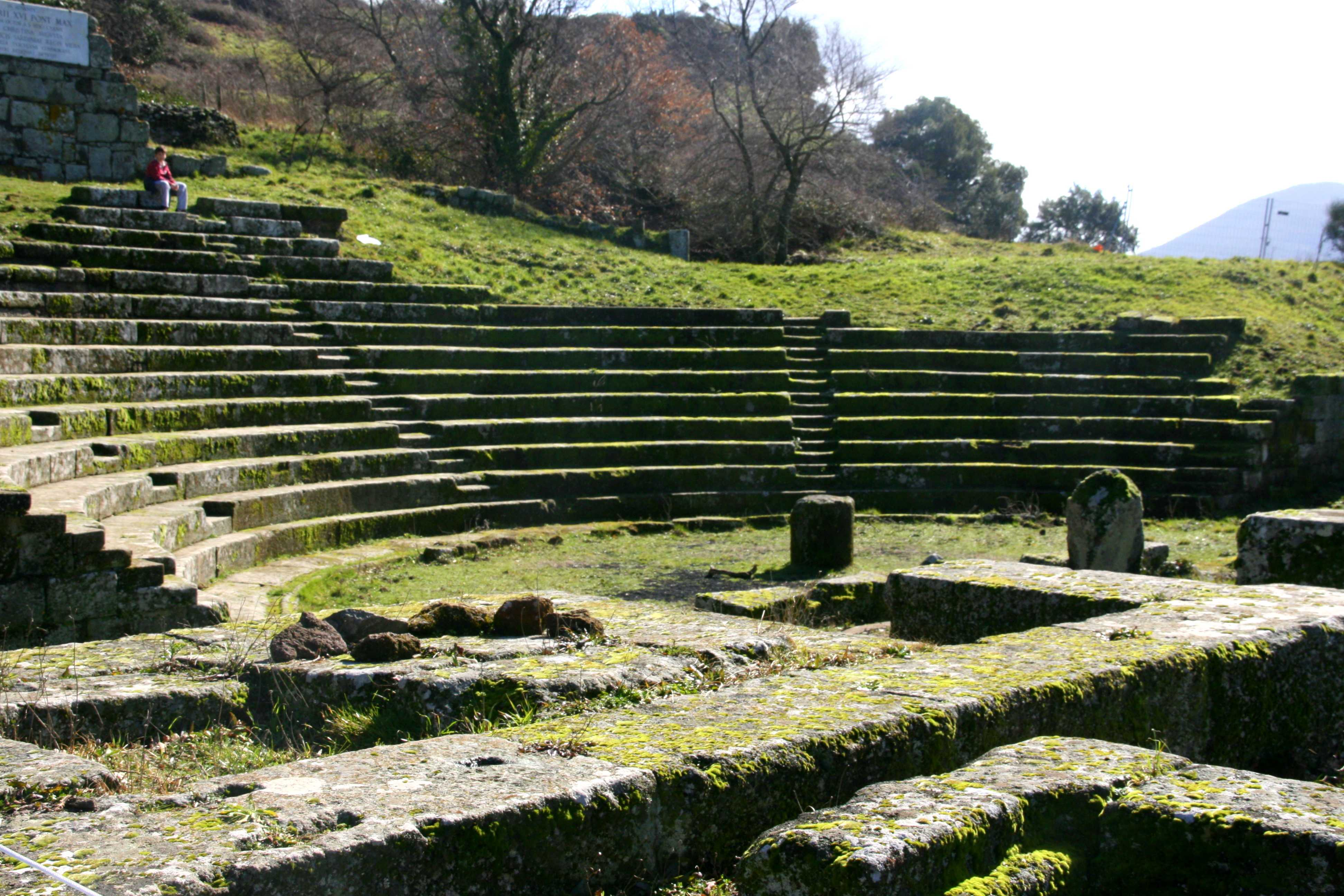
Roman theatre of Tusculum

=== Antiquity ===
According to legend, the city was founded either by Telegonus, the son of Odysseus and Circe, or by the Latin king Latinus Silvius, a descendant of Aeneas, who according to Titus Livius was the founder of most of the towns and cities in Latium. The geographer Philipp Clüver discounts these legends, asserting that the city was founded by Latins about three hundred years before the Trojan War. Funerary urns datable to the 8th–7th centuries BC demonstrate a human presence in the late phases of Latin culture in this area.

Tusculum is first mentioned in history as an independent city-state with a king, a constitution and gods of its own. When Lucius Tarquinius Superbus, the last King of Rome, was expelled in 509 BC, and failed to win back his throne by making war on Rome, he sought refuge with his son-in-law Octavius Mamilius, one of the leading men of Tusculum. The Mamilii claimed to be descended from Telegonus, the founder of the city. Mamilius commanded the army of the Latins against the Romans at the Battle of Lake Regillus, where he was killed in 498 BC. This is the point at which Rome gained predominance among the Latin cities.

The first stable settlement has been identified by excavation in the acropolis area and dates to the 10th century BC, but it is from the 7th-6th centuries BC onwards that there is clear archaeological evidence of a well-organized settlement with growing relations with other Latin peoples in the region. The city developed on the slopes of the acropolis and particularly in the forum area, where a series of substantial and important buildings began to appear.

The city walls can be dated between the 5th and 4th c. BC from the type and technique of construction, as visible on the North slope of the hill.

According to some accounts Tusculum subsequently became an ally of Rome, incurring the frequent hostilities of the other Latin cities. In 460 BC a Sabine named Appius Herdonius occupied the Capitol. Of the Latin cities, only Tusculum quickly sent troops, commanded by the dictator Lucius Mamilius, to help the Romans. Together with the forces of the consul Publius Valerius Poplicola they were able to quash the revolt.

In 458 BC the Aequi attacked Tusculum and captured its citadel. Because of the assistance given Rome the previous year, the Romans came to their defense, and helped regain the citadel, with soldiers under the command of Lucius Quinctius Cincinnatus, who defeated the Aequi at the battle of Mount Algidus.

==== Roman Republic ====
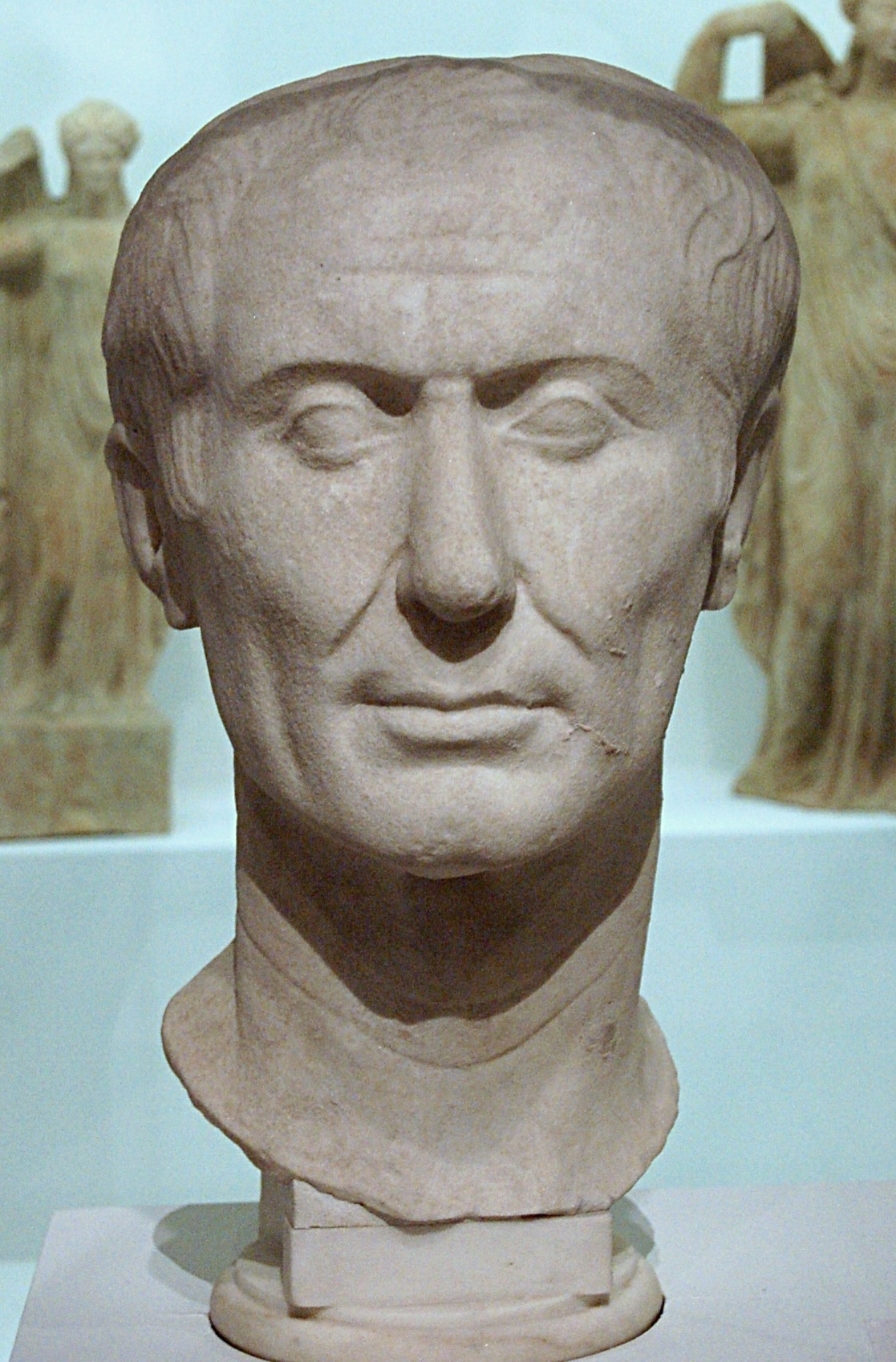
The Tusculum portrait of Julius Caesar from 50–40 BC, found in the city in 1825

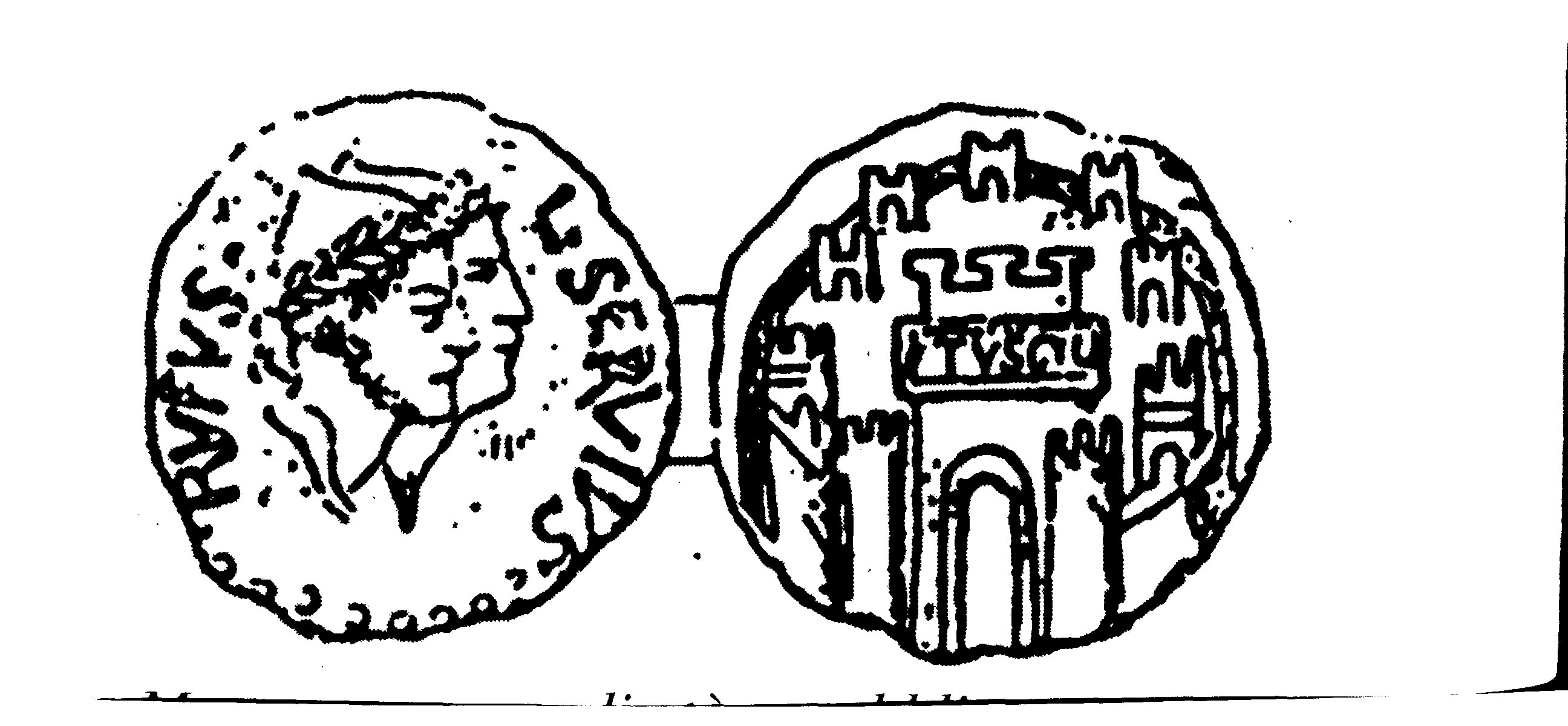
Ancient Roman Republic gold coin of L. Servius Rufus, 44-43 BC. A Dioscuri figure left, Tusculum fortress right.

In 381 BC, after an expression of complete submission to Rome, the people of Tusculum received the franchise from Rome. Tusculum became the first "municipium cum suffragio", or self-governing city. The Tusculan citizens were therefore enrolled in the "Tribus Papiria". Other accounts, however, speak of Tusculum as often allied with Rome's enemies, the last being the Samnites in 323 BC. Major urban development followed the granting of municipal status to the city (381 BC) and its annexation within the Roman sphere of influence, evidenced by the progressive rise of members of the leading Tusculan families to the highest Roman political offices.

In Sulla's civil war Tusculum supported the Marians but after Sulla's victory in 82 BC it suffered extensive devastation and the punishment of becoming a veterans' colonia. Major building renovation dates from this time when monumentalisation of the forum took place and parts of the city wall were rebuilt.

In 54 BC Cicero said: "You are from the most ancient municipium of Tusculum, from which so many consular families are originating, among which even the gens Iuventia; all other municipia (together) do not have so many (consular families) coming from them".

Varro wrote about the laws of Tusculum: "New wine shall not be taken into the town before the Vinalia are proclaimed".

The town council kept the name of senate, but the title of dictator gave place to that of aedile. Notwithstanding this, and the fact that a special college of Roman equites was formed to take charge of the cults of the gods at Tusculum, and especially of the Dioscuri, the citizens resident there were neither numerous nor men of distinction.

In Roman times the city had expanded into two parts: the acropolis with the temples of the Dioscuri and Jupiter Maius, and the main city along the ridge of the hill where the main street passes through the forum to the theatre.

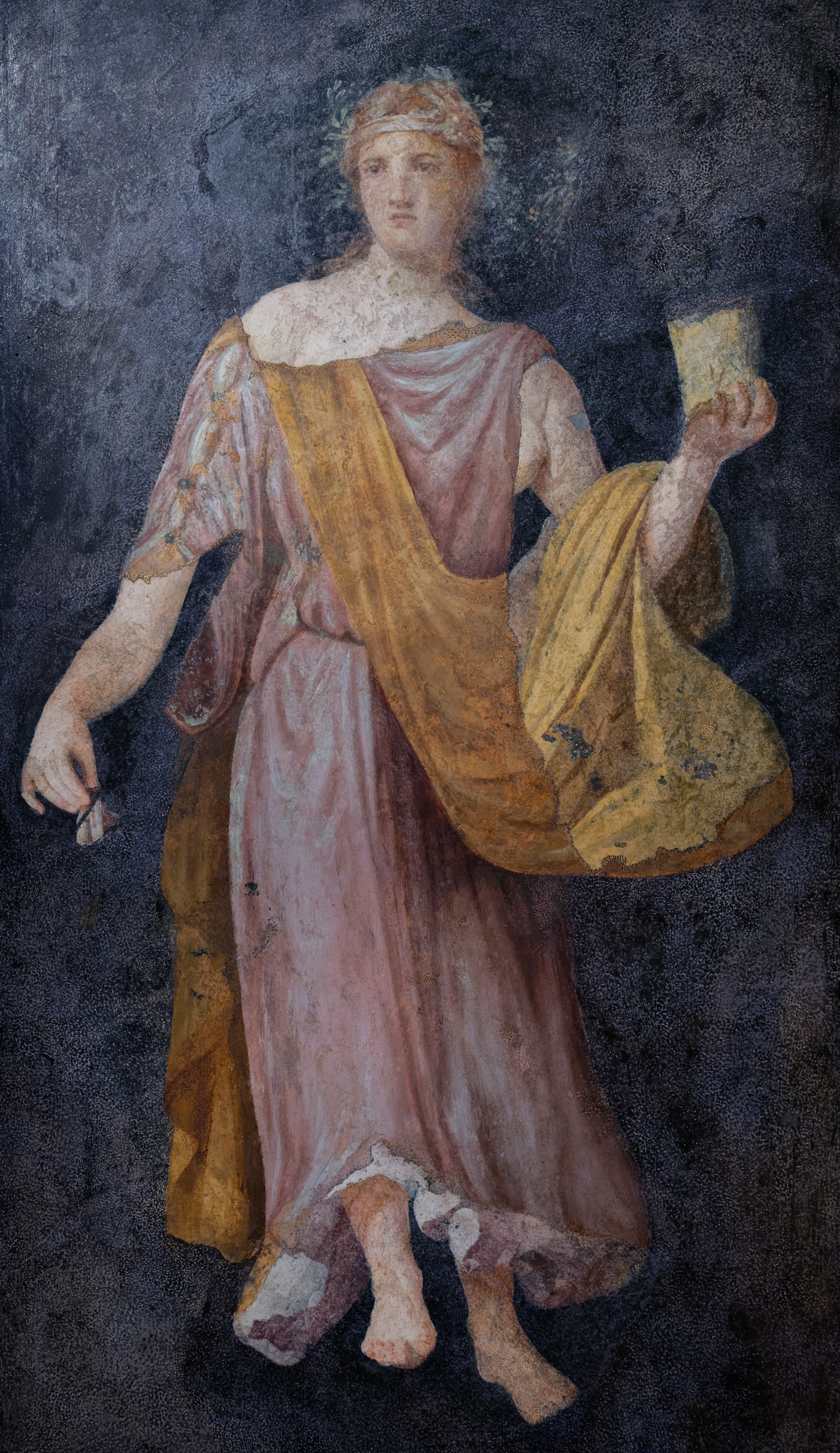
Spring fresco from Tusculum (Louvre) 50-100 AD

The villas of the neighbourhood, of which 36 owners are recorded in the Republican era and 131 villa sites identified, had indeed acquired greater importance than the town itself, which was not easily accessible. By the end of the Republic, and still more during the imperial period, the territory of Tusculum was a favourite place of residence for wealthy Romans. Seneca wrote: "Nobody who wants to acquire a home in Tusculum or Tibur for health reasons or as a summer residence will calculate how much yearly payments are".

In 45 BC Cicero wrote a series of books in his villa in Tusculum, the Tusculanae Quaestiones. In his time there were eighteen villas in the area. An example is the so-called villa of Lucullus, which later belonged to Flavia gens, which was built in terraces on the slope of Tusculum facing Rome: the vast terrace now underlies virtually all the historical centre of Frascati and his mausoleum is visible in the Torrione di Micara near Frascati.

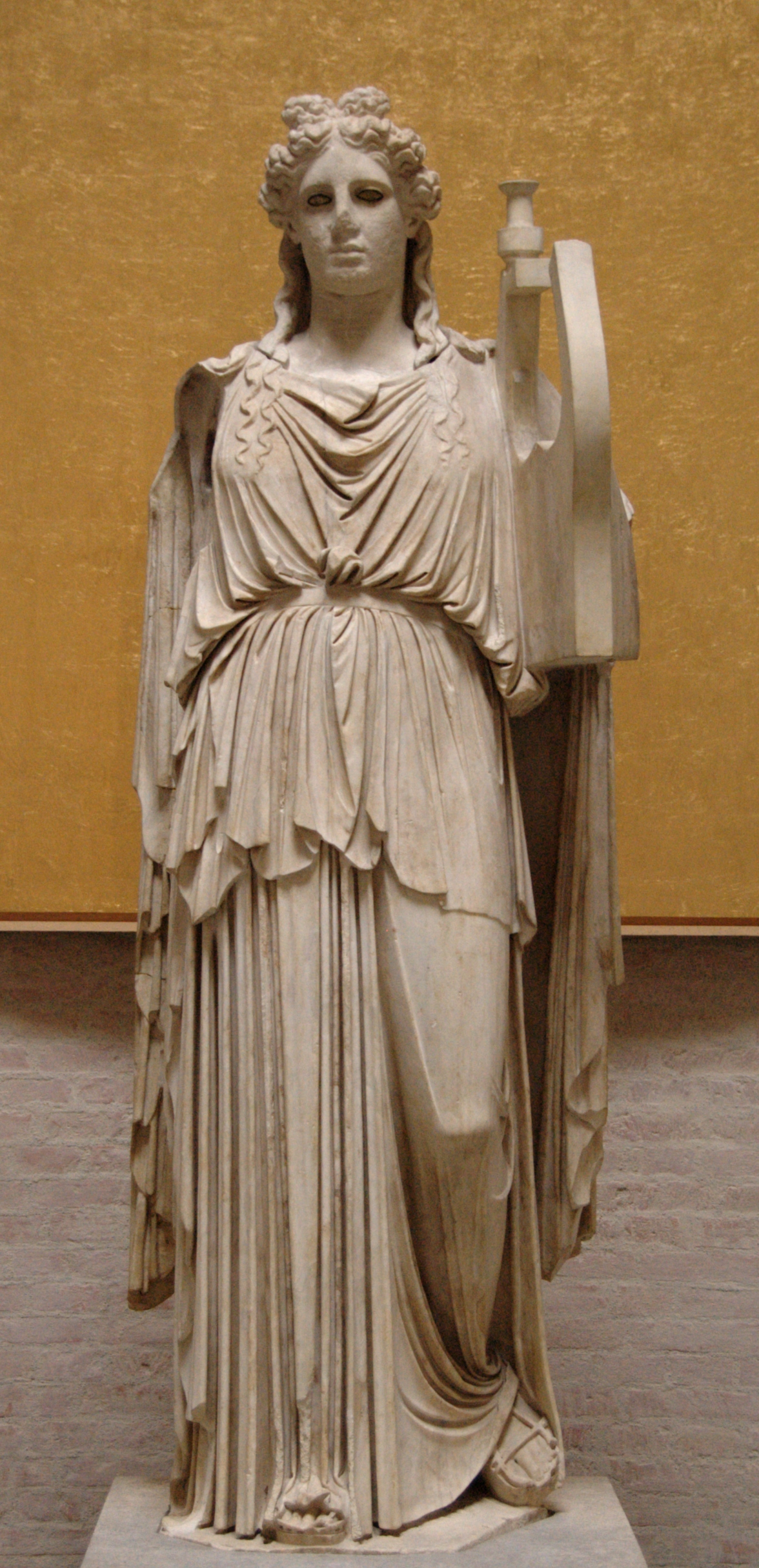
So-called Apollo Barberini 1st-2nd c. AD(Glyptothek Munich)

==== Imperial period ====
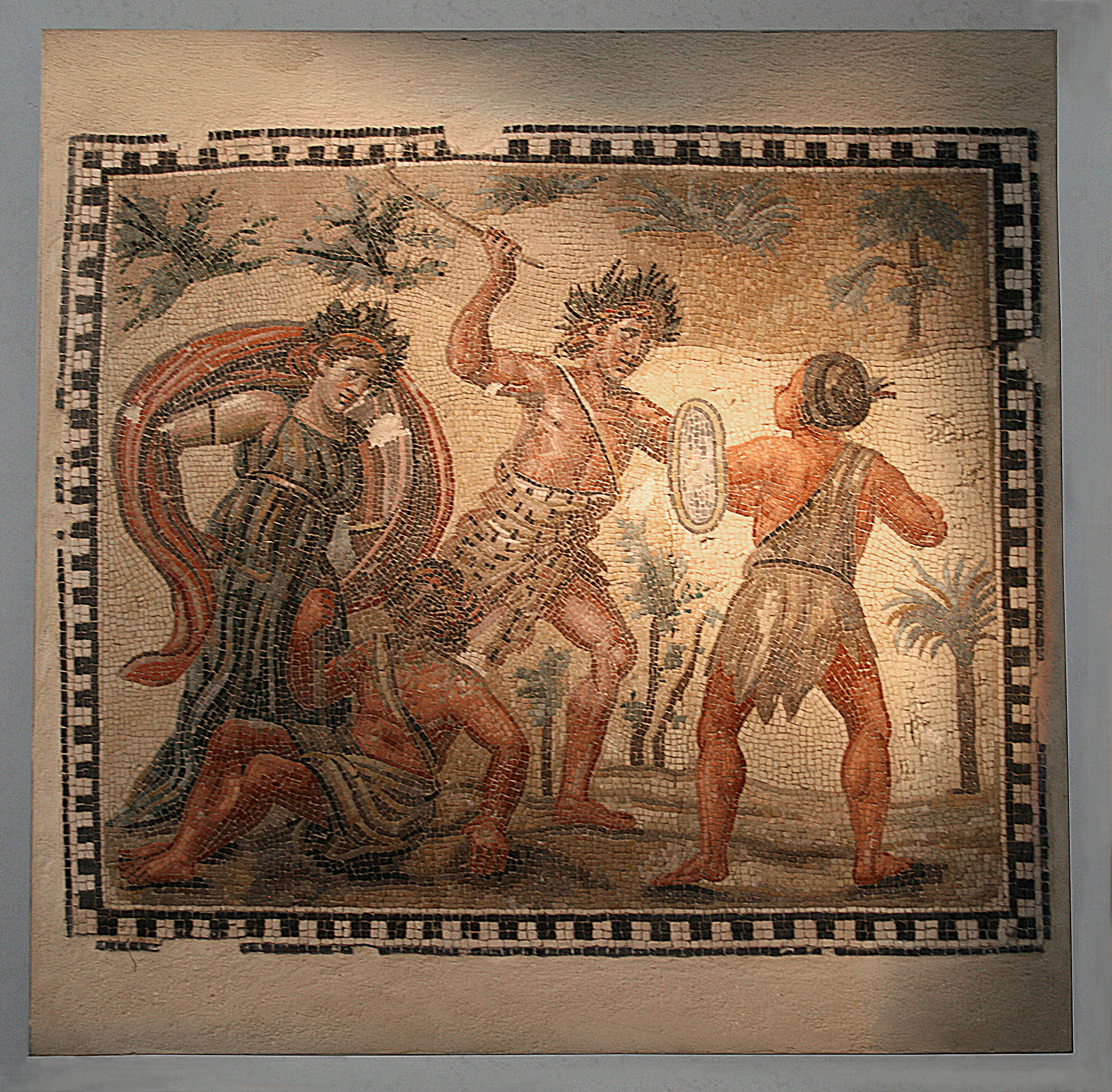
Mosaic of Dionysos and the Indians from the Villa Ruffinella (Pal. Massimo, Rome)

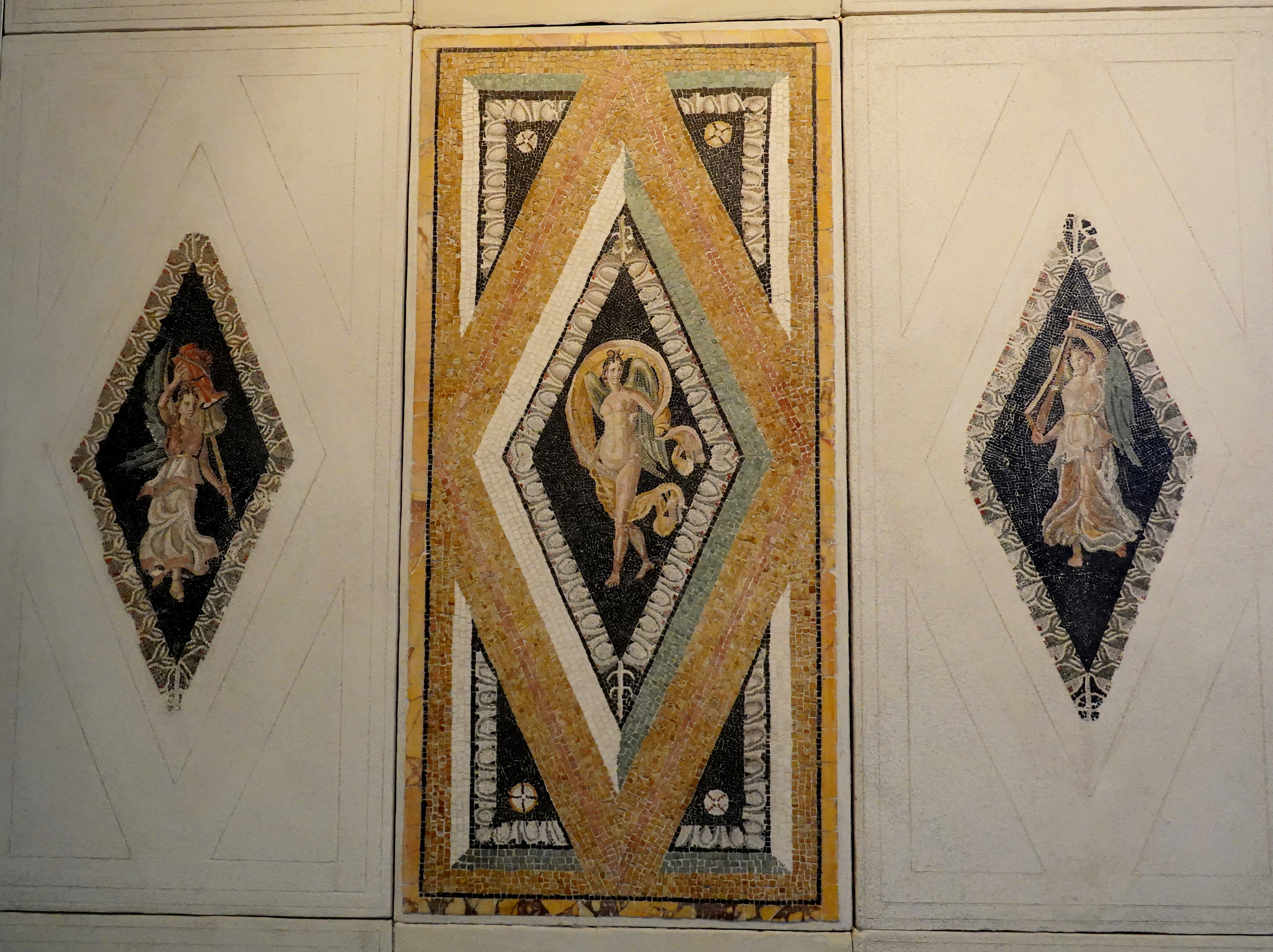
Roman mosaic from Tusculum (Palazzo Massimo alle Terme, Rome)

The Imperial period was the city's golden age and from the reign of Tiberius, a vast program of systematisation and embellishment of the monumental centre was undertaken. Whilst in the Flavian period a slow decline of the city is noticeable, significant building activity included modifications and transformations of various buildings surrounding the forum such as the theatre and in the Temple of Mercury. The last phase of urban expansion was in the Hadrianic period with the construction of the amphitheatre, houses and thermal baths.

Much of the territory (including Cicero's villa), but not the town itself, which lies far too high, was supplied with water by the Aqua Crabra.

The last archaeological evidence of Roman Tusculum is a bronze tablet of 406 AD commemorating the Consul Anicius Petronius Probus and his sister Anicia.

==== Roman gentes with origins in Tusculum ====
- Caninia gens
- Cordia gens
- Coruncania gens
- Fonteia gens
- Fulvia gens
- Furia gens
- Geminia (gens)
- Javonelia gens
- Juventia gens
- Mamilia gens
- Manlia gens
- Porcia gens, including Marcus Porcius Cato the Elder, who was born at Tusculum in 234 BC.
- Rabiria gens

=== Middle Ages ===
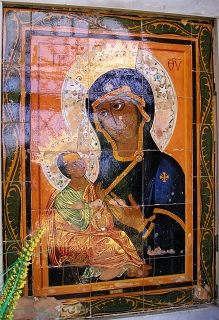
Madonna del Tuscolo

From the 5th to the 10th century there are no historical mentions of Tusculum. In the 10th century it was the base of the Counts of Tusculum, an important family in the medieval history of Rome. They were a clan system whose first mentioned member is Theophylact I (died 924). His daughter Marozia married Alberic I, Marquis of Spoleto and Camerino, and was for a while the arbiter of political and religious affairs in Rome—a position which the Counts held for a long period of time. They were pro-Byzantine and against the German Emperors. From their clan came several Popes in the period between 914 and 1049.

Gregory I of Tusculum rebuilt the fortress on the Tuscolo hill, and gave as a gift the "Criptaferrata" to Saint Nilus the Younger, where the latter built a famous abbey. Gregory also headed the rebellion of the Roman people of 1001 against the German Emperor Otto III.

After 1049 the Counts of Tusculum Papacy declined as the particular "formula" of the papacy-family became outdated. Subsequent events from 1062 confirmed the change of the Counts' politics, which became pro-Emperor in opposition to the Commune of Rome. Tusculum had in this time several notable guests: Henry III, Holy Roman Emperor, and his wife Empress Agnes in 1046, the Pope Eugene III from 1149, Louis VII of France and his wife Eleanor of Aquitaine in 1149, Frederick Barbarossa and the English Pope Adrian IV in 1155.

In 1167 the Roman communal army attacked Tusculum (Battle of Monte Porzio), but it was defeated by the Emperor-allied army, headed by Christian I, Archbishop of Mainz; in the summer of the same year, however, a plague decimated the imperial army and Frederick Barbarossa was forced to return to Germany.

==== Medieval destruction ====
From 1167 the residents of Tusculum moved to the neighbours (Locus) or little villages as Monte Porzio Catone, Grottaferrata and mostly to Frascati: only a little group of defence troops remained in the old city.

When in 1183 the Roman army again attacked Tusculum, Barbarossa sent a new contingent of troops to its defence. The Commune of Rome was however able to destroy the town on 17 April 1191 with the consent of Pope Celestine III and the consent of Henry VI, Holy Roman Emperor, son of Frederick Barbarossa. Roger of Hoveden wrote "lapis supra lapidem non remansit" (not a stone upon a stone remained), indeed the Roman Commune's army took away the stones of the walls of Tusculum as spoils of war in Rome.

After destruction the land of Tusculum became woodland and pasture lands. The buildings destroyed in Tusculum became a big open quarry of materials for the inhabitants of the neighbouring towns of the Alban Hills.

== Description ==
=== The acropolis ===
The summit of the Tusculum ridge is the site of the acropolis, the roughly elliptical perimeter of which was surrounded by walls, most of which have survived to a maximum height of 2 m: these were in square tuff masonry, polygonal masonry, or double curtain walls in tuff blocks. Four gates opened into the acropolis, the most important of which, facing north-east towards the settlement below, was defended by an imposing bastion in square tuff masonry strengthened in the Middle Ages, linked to a long straight stretch of wall that ran west for over 30 m.

Inscriptions from the 1st century BC, discovered in 1901, refer to two temples dedicated to the Dioscuri and Isis. In ancient times the slopes of the acropolis were used as tuff and flint quarries, creating, among other things, a chasm in the ground.

=== The forum ===
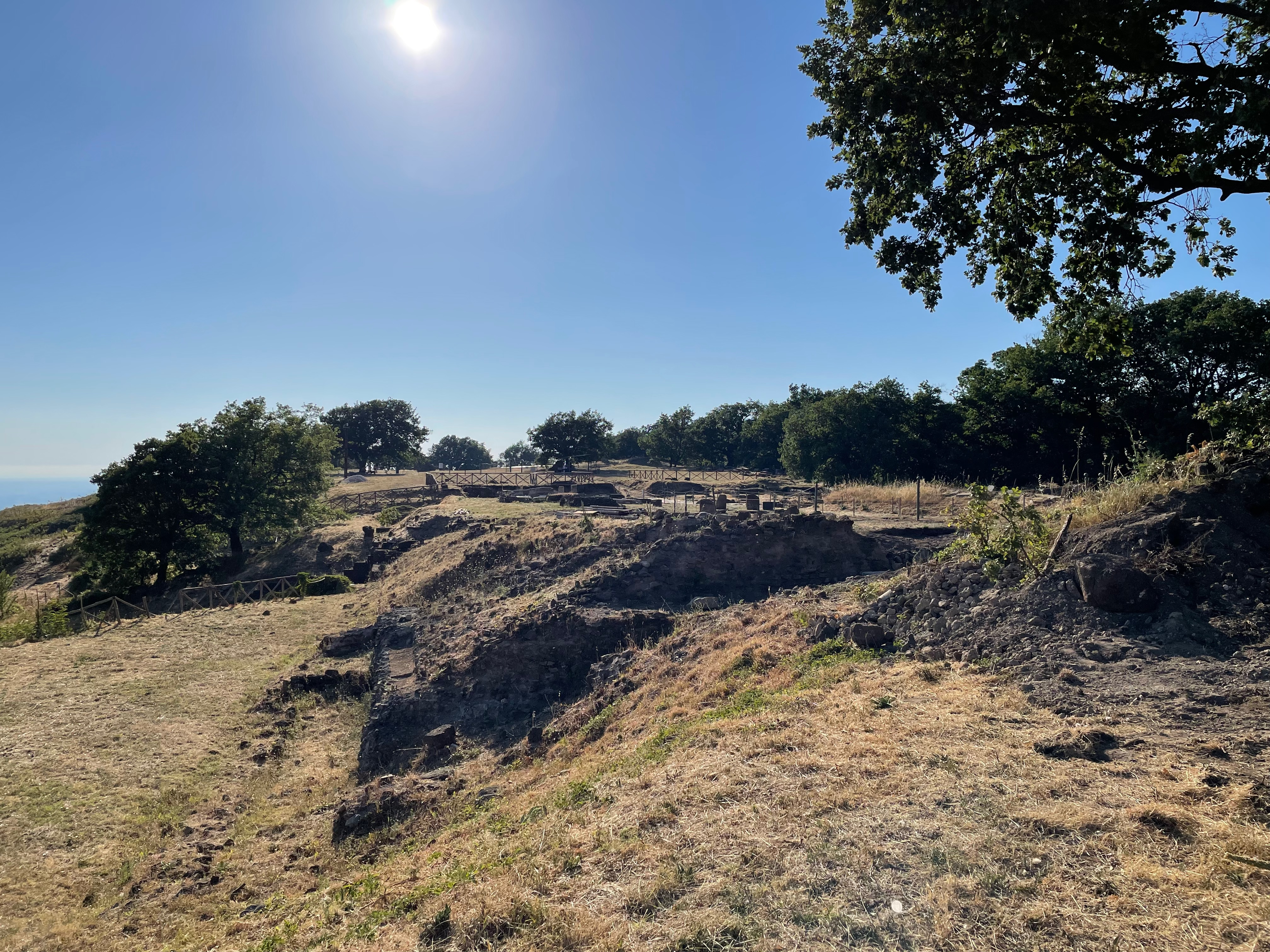
Forum area

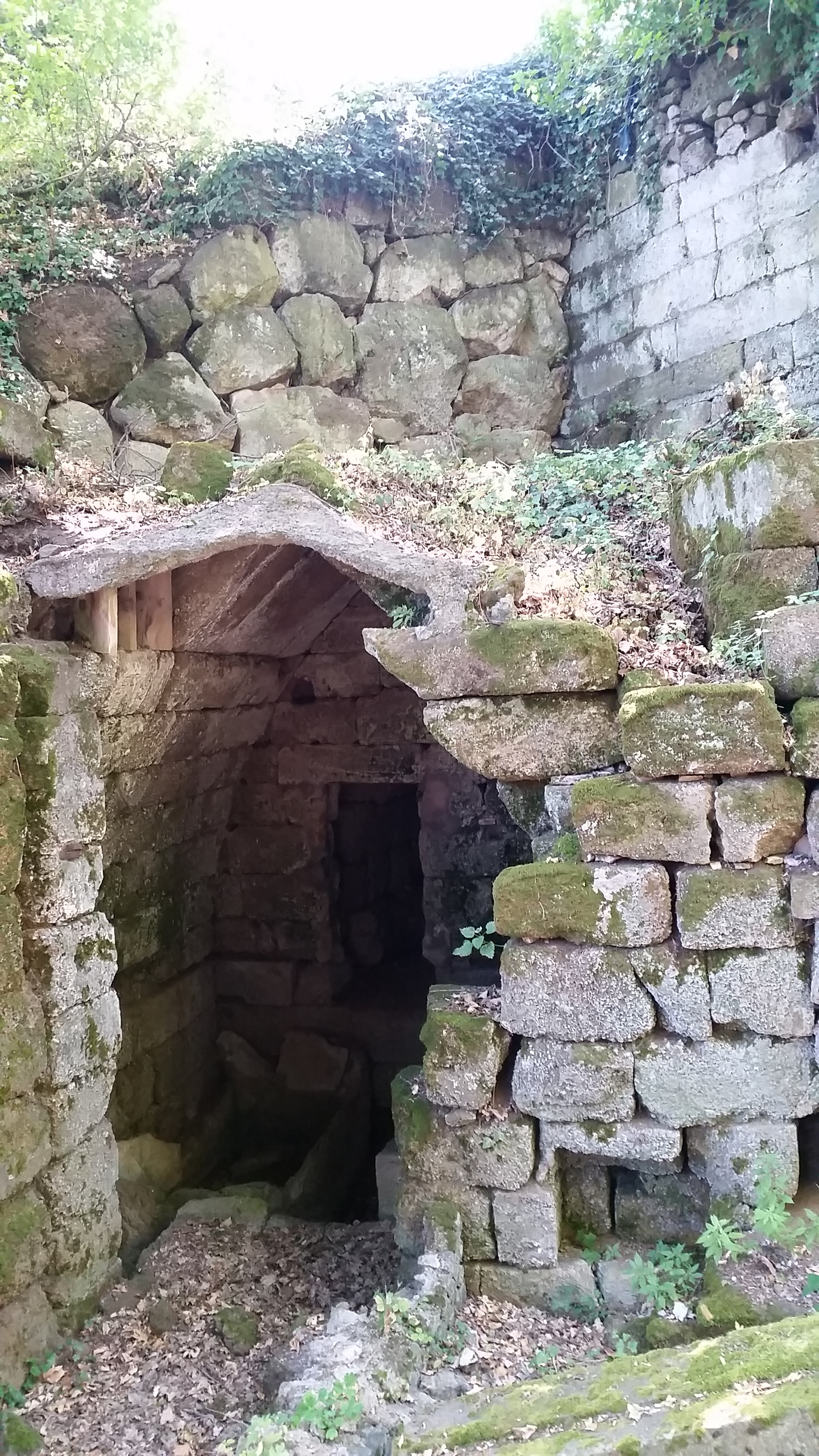
Archaic nymphaeum and polygonal city wall

The forum lies near the top of the hill at 629 m above sea level, and was the most monumental part of the ancient city even if smaller, at 55x36 m, than other cities.

In the Archaic period, the forum probably originated as a market square located at the crossroads of important roads on the edge of the town: perhaps something similar to the Forum Boarium in Rome.

Towards the end of the 4th or beginning of the 3rd century BC, an imposing terracing wall 35 m long, 2.5 m thick and 9 m high of tufa blocks was built in opus quadratum on the right flank of the archaic fountain, and a similar wall along the southern edge of the city. These walls served to create a large platform of approximately 60 x 90 m upon which the first forum of Tusculum was situated.

On the opposite side the limits of the forum were represented by a building approximately 20 x 10 m with a colonnaded façade. The forum was also edged by the so-called Curia of the Tusculan Senate of 10 x 7 m in square tuff masonry dating back to the 5th or 4th century BC.

In the 1st century BC the entrance to the forum from the west, at the intersection of the main roads, was monumentalised with the construction of three temples: the sacellum of Mercury, a small temple dedicated to Hercules, and a third of unknown dedication. New channels and pavements in peperino were introduced, and an unidentified building with mosaic flooring on the north side of the forum.

On the southern side the basilica was built (22.5 x 42.5 m) facing directly onto the plaza over the porticoed building. The central nave, approximately 12 m long, was flanked by two smaller side aisles, with nine columns along the long sides and four along the short sides. The transformation of the monumental area was completed with the construction of the theatre at the eastern end of the forum.

The nearby "archaic cistern" of the 6-5th centuries BC was more likely a monumental fountain measuring 2.2 x 2.9 m with a pointed vault. Downstream of this fountain was the "fountain of the aediles", visible until the 1950s, was built immediately east of the archaic fountain: excavations have uncovered the fountain's foundations with a dedicatory inscription from the Tusculan aediles of 70 BC.

=== The Theatre ===
During this same period, the most imposing and best preserved building of the entire city was built on the southwest side of the forum taking advantage of the slope of the acropolis. It represented a highly impressive stage backdrop for those arriving in the city from the northwest since theatres in the Latium were only built from the 1st century AD. The main access road to the acropolis passed under the cavea of the theatre itself, creating a via tecta or covered road. The original capacity was limited to 1,500 spectators.

The stage, enlarged at the beginning of the Imperial Age to reach 12 by 35 m was embellished with statues of Orestes, Pylades, Telemachus, Telegonus and one of the fathers of the so-called "New Comedy", Diphilus. The cavea reached a diameter of 51 m for 2,000 spectators.

During the Flavian period the theatre underwent renovation of the marble decoration of the stage area.

=== Amphitheatre ===
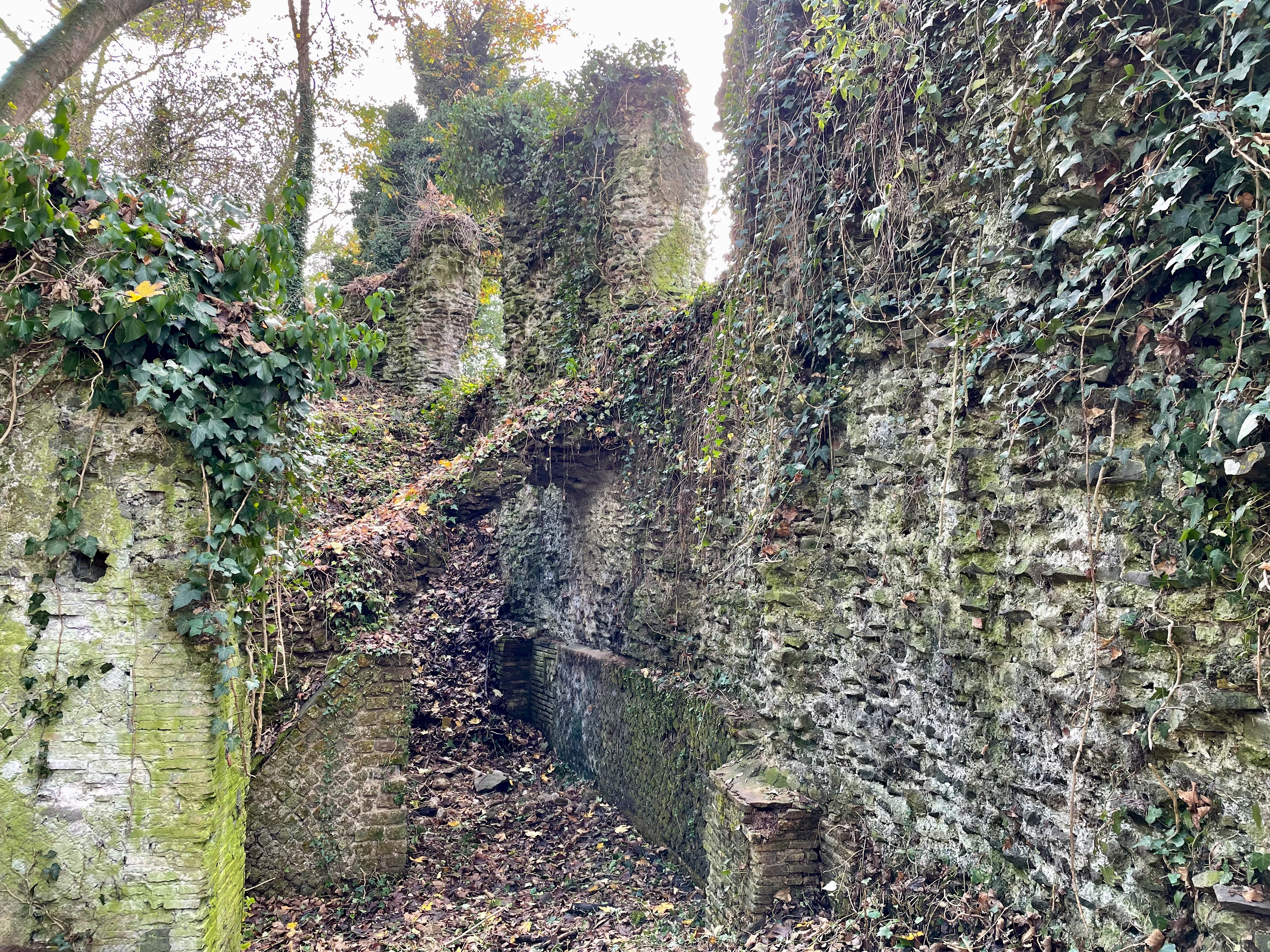
Tusculum Amphitheatre

The Roman amphitheatre of Tusculum is located outside the walls, its south-eastern part resting on the slopes of the hill and its north-western part supported by masonry substructures. It has been partially excavated: the main entrances were excavated in 1820 and the rest in 1867. Its capacity was about 3,000 and it measures 80 x 53 m. The lower part is built in opus quadratum with blocks of peperino, the upper part in opus mixtum with brick lattice. Brick stamps date it to the 2nd century AD.

=== Cicero's Villa ===
Cicero's favourite residence and retreat for study and writing was at or near Tusculum. It was here that he composed his celebrated Tusculan Disputations and other philosophical works. It was a considerable building and comprised two gymnasia with covered parts (xysti) for exercise and philosophical discussion. The higher one was the Lyceum, with a library; the other, shaded by rows of trees, was Academy. The main building contained a covered part, or peristyle, with recesses containing seats. It also had thermal baths and contained a number of works of art, both pictures and statues in bronze and marble. The cost of this and the other house which he built at Pompeii led to him being burdened with debt. The exact location of the villa is unknown; it may have been near the Villa Rufinella.

== Archaeology ==
In 1806 the first campaign of archaeological excavation on the top of the Tuscolo hill was begun by Lucien Bonaparte. In 1825 the archaeologist Luigi Biondi excavated to find out Tusculum, engaged by Queen Maria Cristina of Bourbon, wife of Charles Felix of Sardinia. In 1839 and 1840 the architect and archaeologist Luigi Canina, called by the same royal family, excavated the Theatre area of Tusculum. The ancient works of art excavated were sent to Savoy Castle of Agliè in Piedmont.

In 1825 Lucien Bonaparte found the so-called Tusculum portrait of Julius Caesar at the city's forum.

In 1955 and 1956 the archaeologist Maurizio Borda excavated a necropolis with cinerary urns.

Since 1994 the Tusculum Project has been excavating on the site. Geophysics in 2015 revealed an important discovery: a monumental building in the plateau above the monumental area. Excavations from 2015 to 2018 brought to light part of baths of the Hadrianic era built on a previous domestic building and on which a basilica was built during the Middle Ages. In 2023 a fine statue of a Bacchante dating from the 1st c. AD was discovered in the baths which may have been owned by Cicero and that he had described. Since 2019 the forum and the basilica have been revealed.

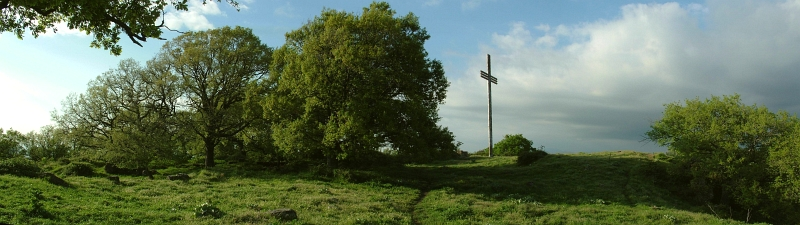
Croce del Tuscolo.

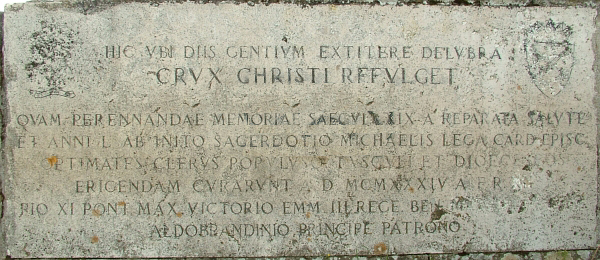
The marble slab.

== Main sights ==
The Roman theatre on the hill of Tuscolo and the Villa of Tiberius are now accessible. In the extra-urban area located south of the city, between it and the Via Latina, there is archeological evidence of burials in the medieval church already in ruin after 1191 and dating to the 13th century, found by the last archeological excavation (1999).

In the High Middle Ages, there were three churches in Tusculum: St. Saviour and Holy Trinity "in civitate", and St. Thomas on the acropolis. The Greek monastery of St. Agatha lay at the foot of the Tuscolo hill, at the 15th mile of the Via Latina road, the old "Statio Roboraria" : it was founded in 370 AD by the basilian monk John of Cappadocia, a disciple of St. Basil of Caesarea, called St. Basil the Great. He brought here a relic of the master, handed it over to him by monk Gregory Nazianzus. Saint Nilus the Younger died in this Greek monastery on 27 December 1005.

The Portrait of "Madonna del Tuscolo", placed nowadays in a little aedicule on the Tuscolo hill, is a reproduction in ceramic of an earlier original icon from Tusculum, spoil of war, which now is in the Abbey of St. Mary in Grottaferrata.

The cross of Tusculum there was already in 1840, as reported by Cardinal Nicholas Wiseman, rector of the English College. In October, 1864 the students of the English College rebuilt the plinth of foundation of the old cross. Now on the top of the Tuscolo hill is an altar and an iron cross 19 metres (62,33 ft) high. The height of cross underlines the fact that it was built 19 centuries after the death of Jesus Christ.

== Quotes ==
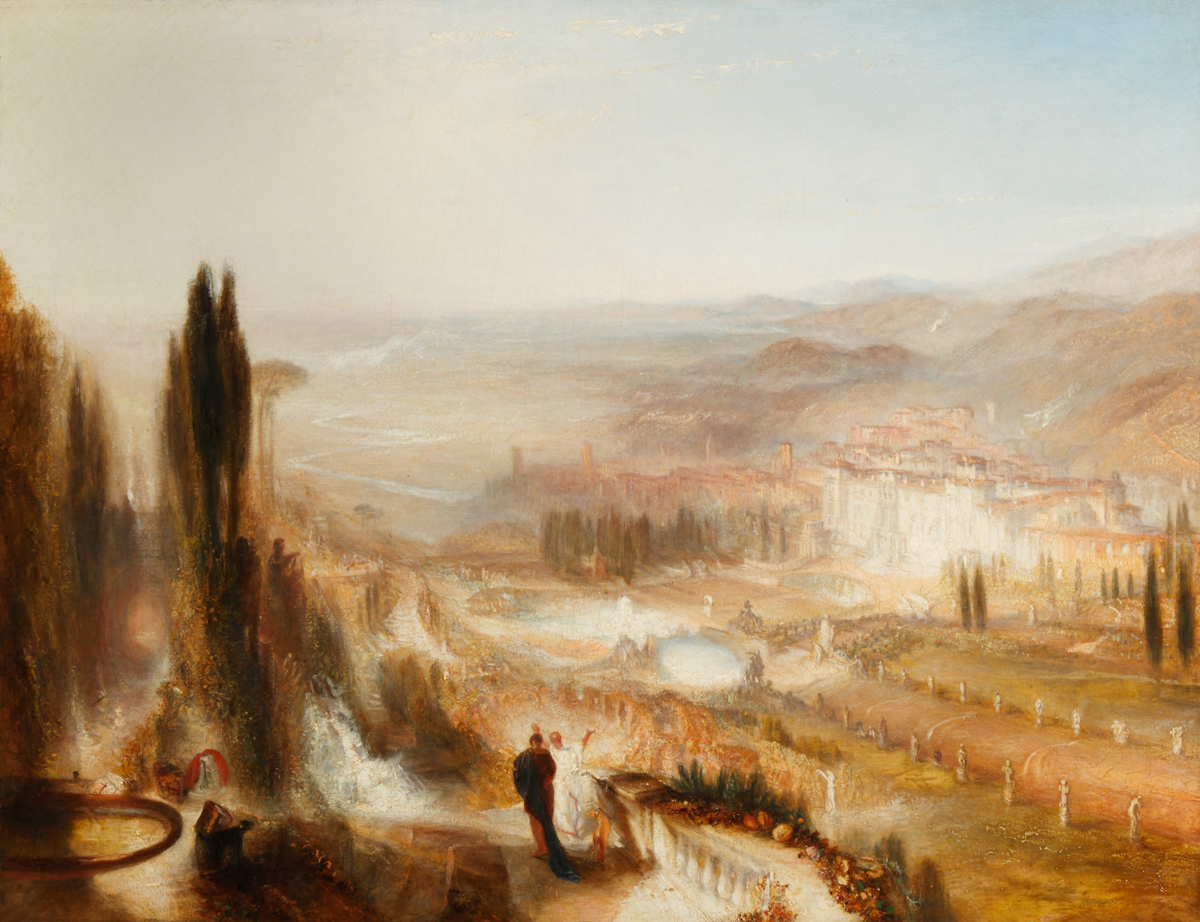
Cicero at His Villa at Tusculum by J.M.W. Turner, 1839

Strabo wrote about Tusculum:

But still closer to Rome than the mountainous country where these cities lie, there is another ridge, which leaves a valley (the valley near Algidum) between them and is high as far as Mount Albanus. It is on this chain that Tusculum is situated, a city with no mean equipment of buildings; and it is adorned by the plantings and villas encircling it, and particularly by those that extend below the city in the general direction of the city of Rome; for here Tusculum is a fertile and well-watered hill, which in many places rises gently into crests and admits of magnificently devised royal palaces.

== Sources ==
- Richard Stillwell, ed. Princeton Encyclopedia of Classical Sites, 1976: "Tusculum, Latium, Italy"
- Cassius Dio. Roman History.
- Dionysius of Halicarnassus. The Roman Antiquities.
- Thietmar of Merseburg. Chronicle.
- Roger of Howden. Chronica.
- Gregorovius, Ferdinand. Rome in the Middle Ages Vol. IV Part 1. 1905.
- William Gell The Topography of Rome and its Vicinity with Map. 2 vols. London, 1834. [Rev. and enlarged by Edward Henry Banbury. London, 1846.]
- William Gell. Analisi storico-topografico-antiquaria della carta de' dintorni di Roma secondo le osservazione di Sir W. Gell e del professore A. Nibby. Rome, 1837 [2nd ed. 1848].
- Thomas Ashby. The Roman Campagna in Classical Times. London, 1927.
- G. Bagnani. The Roman Campagna and its treasures. London, 1929.
- G.E. Mc Cracken. A History of Ancient Tusculum. Washington, 1939.
- B. Goss. Tusculum in PECS (Princeton Encyclopedia of Classical Sites). 1976.
- T.J. Cornell. The beginnings of Rome: Italy and Rome from the Bronze Age to Punic War. London, 1995. ISBN 0-415-01596-0.
- Xavier Dupré. Scavi archeologici di Tusculum. Rome, 2000. ISBN 88-900486-0-3.
