= Xavier Dupré i Raventós =

Spanish archaeologist and historian

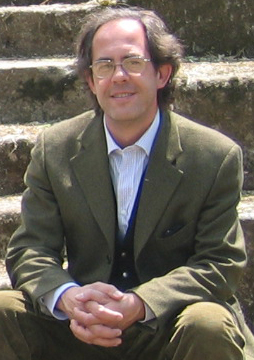
- Xavier in the Theatre of Tusculum
- Born: 1 April 1956; Barcelona, Spain
- Died: 20 April 2006 (aged 50); Rome, Italy
- Monuments: Memorial marker at the theatre of Tusculum; Memorial sculpture at the Tarraco Circus arena
- Education: Universitat de Barcelona
- Employer(s): Taller-Escola d'Arqueologia (1986-1990); Escuela Española de Historia y Arqueología en Roma (1994-2006)
- Organization: XIV International Congress of Classical Archaeology

Xavier Dupré i Raventós (1 July 1956, in Barcelona – 20 April 2006, in Rome) was a Spanish archaeologist and historian of classical antiquity. He was the first provincial archaeologist appointed by the archaeological division of the Generalitat de Catalunya in Tarragona. He was also director of Taller–Escola d’Arqueologia de Tarragona (TED’A), director of excavations of the Roman city of Tusculum (Lazio, Italy) and deputy director of the Escuela Española de Historia y Arqueología in Rome (part of CSIC).

== Life and career ==
=== Early years ===
Xavier Dupré became interested in archaeology from a very early age. While studying high school in Barcelona, he took part in archaeological activities at Empúries under the direction of Eduard Ripoll. He later studied at Universitat de Barcelona and graduated in Prehistory, Ancient History and Archaeology in 1979. After being awarded a grant from the Comisión Mixta Hispano-Italiana in 1980, he enrolled in the Università degli Studi di Roma La Sapienza. The grant brought him into contact with the Escuela Española de Historia y Arqueología en Roma (EEHAR), the institution he would later command. Dupré worked in the excavations carried out in Gabii. In his dissertation, finished in 1981 and advised by Miquel Taradell, Dupré studied the architectural terracottas of Juno’s sanctuary in Gabii (Lazio, Italy).

=== Tarragona ===
In late 1981, he moved to Tarragona as a result of winning a place as provincial archaeologist of the Servei d’Arqueologia del Departament de Cultura de la Generalitat de Catalunya. Once there, he instigated various research and restoration projects at the circus and provincial forum of Tarraco, the ancient Roman capital of the Tarraconensis province.

In December 1986, he became director of the Taller-Escola d'Arqueologia (TED’A). The school was managed by Tarragona local council, under the leadership of the mayor, historian Josep Maria Recasens. TED’A was part of the trade schools and workshops programme run by the Spanish Ministry of Labour and the European Social Fund. During its short lifespan, from 1986 to 1990, the TED'A transformed the Roman patrimony of Tarragona into a benchmark for urban archaeology in Spain.

The project had three goals. The first was to train different specialists in Tarragona’s archaeological heritage, preparing them to find employment by furnishing them with the necessary theoretical knowledge and practical experience. The second was to excavate and study the top end of the Roman circus and the amphitheatre for conservation and restoration purposes. The third goal of the school was to strengthen the relationship between the people of Tarragona and the field of archaeology by rendering archaeological heritage more accessible. In this respect, the publications issued by TED’A during its years of operation are a model of best practice in Spanish archaeology.

=== Rome and Tusculum ===
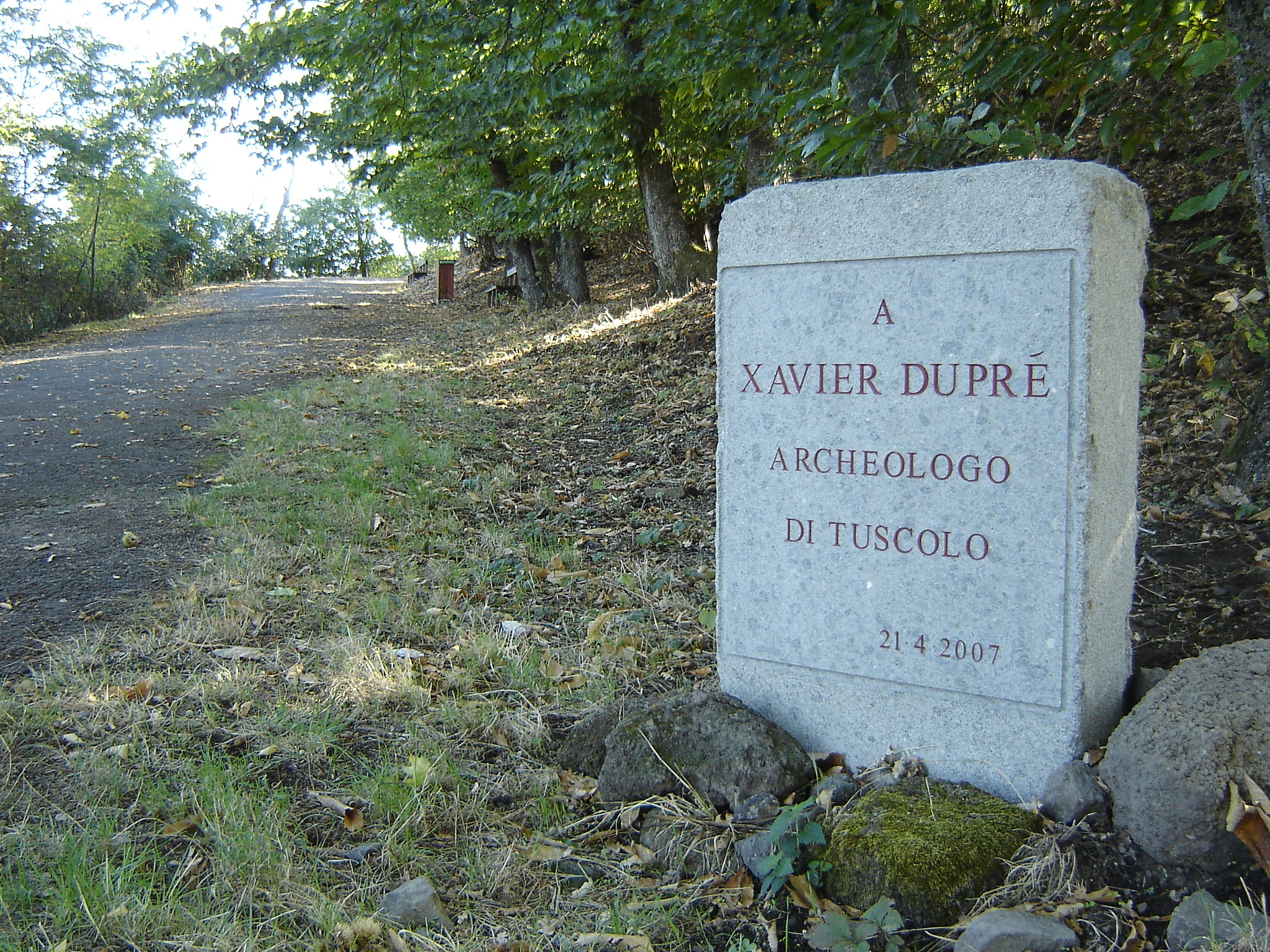
Inscription dedicated to Xavier Dupré. Tusculum, Italy

After TED’A closure in 1990, Dupré established in Rome as a pre-doctoral scholarship holder by EEHAR. He kept studying the Roman heritage of Tarragona through the organisation of the XIV International Congress of Classical Archaeology, held at Tarragona in 1993 by the International Association of Classical Archaeologists and his doctoral thesis on the Berà Roman arch, finished in 1992 and awarded by the XII Premi Josep Puig i Cadafalch prize by the Institut d’Estudis Catalans. Once the thesis was published, he remained in the EEHAR as a post-doctoral scholarship holder until 1994, when he was promoted to head scientist. The very next year he was chosen deputy director of the institution, the office he would hold until his death in 2006.

His main work while in Rome centred around the scientific investigation of the ancient city of Tusculum in Lazio, Italy. Extensive excavation projects were undertaken in various sections of the city including the theatre, the forum, and the city walls. The Tusculum project, which was coordinated by EEHAR and led by Dupré involved several universities and archaeological institutions from Italy and Spain and became a nexus of scientific exchange between the countries. It was important to Dupré to share the results of the excavations with the scientific community, so from 1994 onwards he published reports on the works undertaken during each archaeological campaign in a series of publications by EEHAR; he also published a monograph on Tusculum in EEHAR’s ‘Bibliotheca Italica’ series and participated in many international scientific forums. His archaeological research ended in 2006 when Xavier Dupré died in Rome after a long illness.

== Legacy and tributes ==
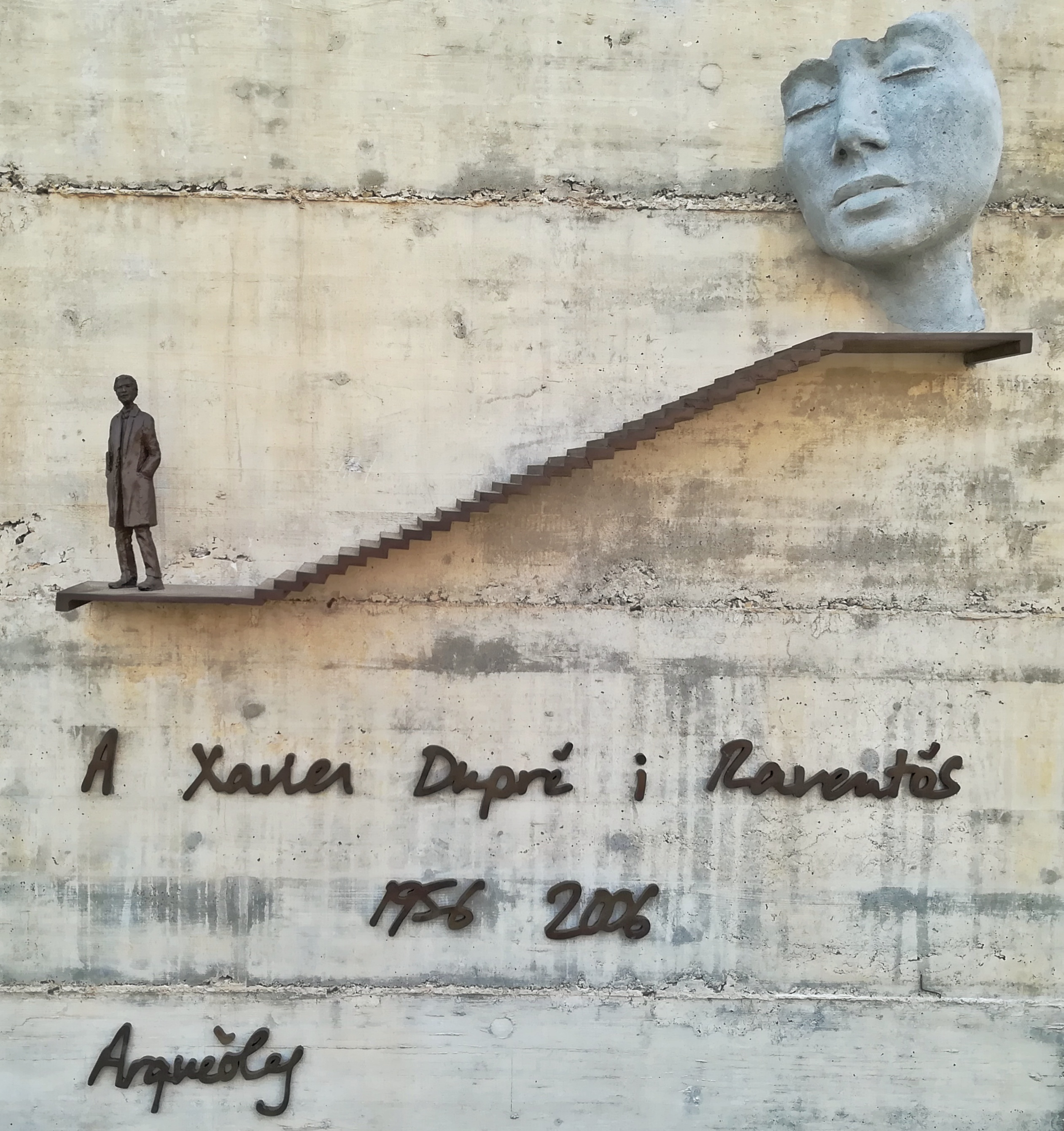
Monument to the memory of Xavier Dupré in Tarragona, Catalonia

The premature death of Dupré in 2006 shocked the archaeological world and the scientific institutions he was part of the International Committee on Archaeological Heritage Management of ICOMOS, the Deutsches Archäologisches Institut, Real Academia de la Historia or the Istituto Internazionale di Studi Liguri. After his death, the academic community began to pay him tribute in a series of events such as homages at the Institut d’Estudis Catalans or the CSIC. The International Association of Classical Archaeology also held a one-day conference in his honour at the Università degli Studi di Roma La Sapienza. On April 21, 2007, his ashes were scattered at the theatre of Tusculum. To mark the occasion, local association XI Comunità Montana del Lazio Castelli Romani e Prenestini erected a monument at the start of the path to the site commemorating his work. The inscription on the monument reads “A Xavier Dupré, archeologo di Tuscolo” [To Xavier Dupré, archaeologist of Tusculum]. In 2008, Tarragona local council decided to name a public space in the city after Dupré and in 2012, Dupré was honoured with a posthumous Diploma al Mèrit Cultural by the city of Tarragona. In 2016, the Catalan city held the third International Congress of Archaeology and Ancient world. In 2018 a sculpture by the Italian artist Beátrice Bizot was placed on the Tarraco Circus arena in his memory.
