= Lucius Calpurnius Piso (consul 1 BC) =

Roman senator, consul, and augur

Lucius Calpurnius Piso (also known to contemporaries as Lucius Calpurnius Piso the Augur) (died AD 24) was a Roman senator who was appointed consul in 1 BC as the colleague of Cossus Cornelius Lentulus Gaetulicus. He was also an augur.

== Life and career ==
Calpurnius Piso was a member of the Plebeian gens Calpurnia. He was the son of Gnaeus Calpurnius Piso, consul in 23 BC, and the brother of Gnaeus Calpurnius Piso, the consul in 7 BC. The influence of his brother enabled him to achieve a rapid consulship. Afterwards Calpurnius Piso was appointed the proconsular governor of Asia, possibly around AD 1.

He was married to Statilia.

In AD 16, after the treason trial and suicide of Marcus Scribonius Libo, Calpurnius Piso stated his disgust at the corruption of the judicial system. He declared he would leave Rome and live in self-imposed exile until his death. He was persuaded to remain in Rome by the emperor Tiberius. In that same year, he attempted to bring legal action against Urgulania, an intimate friend of the emperor's mother, Livia. She refused to appear in court, and took refuge in the palace, while Livia denounced Calpurnius Piso. Tiberius was forced to intervene, and Urgulania was forced to pay a fine.

In AD 20, Calpurnius Piso was one of the advocates who defended his brother who faced treason charges, as his brother had been suspected of having killed Germanicus. Then in AD 24, Piso was brought up on charges of maiestas, but died before his case could come before a court.

An augur, Calpurnius Piso was described as having a ferocious and violent temper, and was a man who spoke his mind to Tiberius.

He owned the Villa Pisoni in Baiae.

== See also ==
- List of Roman consuls

== Sources ==
- Syme, Ronald (1986). The Augustan Aristocracy. Clarendon Press. ISBN 978-0-19-814859-3.

Political offices
Preceded by Quintus Fabricius, and Lucius Caninius Gallus as Suffect consuls	Consul of the Roman Empire; 1 BC with Cossus Cornelius Lentulus Gaetulicus	Succeeded by Aulus Plautius, and Aulus Caecina Severus as Suffect consuls
