= Lucius Caninius Gallus (consul 37 BC) =

Roman politician

Lucius Caninius Gallus (fl. 1st century BC) was a Roman politician who served as consul in 37 BC.

He was a member of the Plebeian gens Caninia. Gallus was the son of Lucius Caninius Gallus, and a grandson of Gaius Antonius Hybrida. He was thus related to the triumvir Mark Antony, and was a second cousin to Mark Anthony's children, such as Antonia Minor (mother of Germanicus and emperor Claudius) and Cleopatra Selene II, Queen of Mauretania. Gallus was probably elected to the office of Praetor by 40 BC at the latest. He was then elected consul alongside Marcus Vipsanius Agrippa in 37 BC. He had a son by the same name who was consul in 2 BC.

Gallus may have been a patron of the Latin poet Sextus Propertius.

== Sources ==
- Broughton, T. Robert S., The Magistrates of the Roman Republic, Vol II (1951)

Political offices
Preceded by L. Cornelius Lentulus Cruscellio; L. Marcius Philippus as suffecti	Consul of the Roman Republic; 37 BC with Marcus Agrippa	Succeeded by Titus Statilius Taurus as suffectus
