= Aulus Plautius (consul 1 BC) =

1st century BC Roman senator and suffect consul

Aulus Plautius (c. 44 BC – 1st century AD) was a Roman politician and senator who was appointed Suffect consul during the reign of Augustus.

== Biography ==
The son of Aulus Plautius who was praetor urbanus in 51 BC, Plautius was appointed consul suffectus in 1 BC, replacing Cossus Cornelius Lentulus Gaetulicus. It has been speculated that he may have been the Aulus Plautius who was sent to Apulia by Augustus possibly around AD 9/10, with the task of interrogating and torturing slaves for some purpose, although it is more likely that this refers to his son Aulus Plautius who may have been involved with the suppression of a slave revolt in Apulia in AD 24.

Aulus Plautius was married to Vitellia, the great-aunt of the future Roman emperor Vitellius. They had at least two sons and one daughter: Aulus Plautius (suffect consul in 29 and who initiated the conquest of Britannia); Quintus Plautius (ordinary consul in 36), and Plautia, who was the wife of Publius Petronius.

It is unlikely that this was the Aulus Plautius who was the proconsular governor of Cilicia et Cyprus around 22/20 BC; that one may possibly have been his father.

== Sources ==
- Giuseppe Camodeca: Problemi di storia sociale in Alife Romana. Le gentes senatorie degli Aedii e dei Granii e i ceti dirigenti del primo principato. In: Luigi Di Cosmo (Hrsg.): Il territorio Alifano. Archeologia, arte, storia. Atti del convegno, S. Angelo d’Alife, 26 aprile 1987. S. Angelo d’Alife 1990. S. 123–143.
- Werner Eck, Antonio Caballos, Fernando Fernández: Das Senatus consultum de Cn. Pisone patre. Beck, München 1996, ISBN 3-406-41400-1, S. 105−106.
- Prosopographia Imperii Romani (PIR²). 1998, P 456.

Political offices
Preceded by Cossus Cornelius Lentulus Gaetulicus, and Lucius Calpurnius Piso as Ordinary consuls	Suffect Consul of the Roman Empire; 1 BC with Aulus Caecina Severus	Succeeded by Gaius Julius Caesar, and Lucius Aemilius Paullus as Ordinary consuls
