= Gaius Fufius Geminus (consul 2 BC) =

Roman senator and consul during the rule of Augustus

Gaius Fufius Geminus (fl. 1st century BC) was an imperial Roman senator who was appointed suffect consul for the period September-October 2 BC, as the colleague of Lucius Caninius Gallus.

== Biography ==
Fufius Geminus was either the son or nephew of the Fufius Geminus who was governor of Pannonia in 35 BC. He was appointed consul suffectus in 2 BC (around September), replacing the Princeps Augustus. He was the co-author of the Lex Fufia Caninia, which restricted the manumission of slaves.

Fufius Geminus only served as consul for a couple of months – by 1 December, he had been replaced. It has been speculated that he may have died while in office, or perhaps he was caught up in the political events that surrounded the banishment of Augustus’ daughter Julia, resulting in his name being erased from the Fasti Magistrorum Vici.

Fufius Geminus was married to one Vitia; together they had a son, Gaius Fufius Geminus, who was consul in AD 29 and later put to death by the emperor Tiberius. Vitia was executed in the year 32 for mourning the death of her son.

== See also ==
- List of Roman consuls

== Sources ==
- Stern, Gaius (2006). Women, children, and senators on the Ara Pacis Augustae : a study of Augustus' vision of a New World Order in 13 BC. University of California, Berkeley. OCLC 892834012.
- Swan, Peter Michael (17 June 2004). The Augustan Succession: An Historical Commentary on Cassius Dio's Roman History Books 55-56 (9 B.C.-A.D. 14). Oxford University Press. doi:10.1093/oso/9780195167740.001.0001. ISBN 978-0-19-516774-0.
- Syme, Ronald (1986). The Augustan Aristocracy. Clarendon Press. ISBN 978-0-19-814859-3.

Political offices
Preceded by Augustus XIII; L. Caninius Gallus	Suffect consul of the Roman Empire; 2 BC with Lucius Caninius Gallus	Succeeded by Quintus Fabricius as Suffect consul
