= Caninia gens =

Ancient Roman family

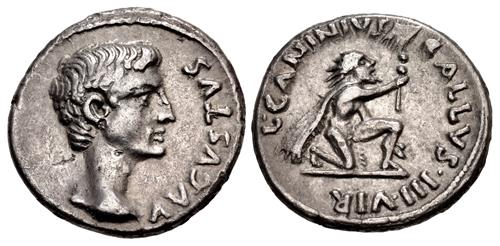
Denarius of Lucius Caninius Gallus, moneyer in 12 BC.

The gens Caninia was a plebeian family at ancient Rome during the later Republic. The first member of the gens who obtained any of the curule offices was Gaius Caninius Rebilus, praetor in 171 BC; but the first Caninius who was consul was his namesake, Gaius Caninius Rebilus, in 45 BC.

== Origin ==
The nomen Caninius may be connected with the Latin adjective canus or kanus, meaning "white" or "grey", perhaps referring to the color of a person's hair. It might also be derived from the adjective caninus, meaning "hound-like", "snarling".

== Praenomina ==
The principal names of the Caninii were Gaius, Lucius, and Marcus, which were also the three most common praenomina throughout Roman history. At least one of the family bore the praenomen Aulus.

== Branches and cognomina ==
The chief families of the Caninii bore the cognomina Gallus and Rebilus. The surname Satrius is also found, and there was a Caninius Sallustius, who was adopted by some member of this gens. Gallus was a common surname, which may refer to a Gaul, or to a cock.

== Members ==
This list includes abbreviated praenomina. For an explanation of this practice, see filiation.

=== Caninii Rebili ===
- Gaius Caninius Rebilus, praetor in 171 BC, obtained Sicily as his province.
- Marcus Caninius Rebilus, sent by the senate into Macedonia in 170 BC to investigate the lack of Roman progress in the war against Perseus; one of the ambassadors appointed in 167 BC to return the Thracian hostages to Cotys.
- Gaius Caninius Rebilus, one of Caesar's legates in Gaul, and later during the Civil War; consul suffectus for the final day of 45 BC.
- (Caninius) Rebilus, probably a brother of the consul of 45 BC, proscribed by the triumvirs, but escaped to Sextus Pompeius in Sicily.
- Gaius Caninius Rebilus, suffect consul in 12 BC. Died in office.
- Gaius Caninius Rebilus, consul in AD 37, and likely son of the consul suffectus of 12 BC.
- Caninius Rebilus, a man of consular rank and great wealth, but bad character; Julius Graecinus refused to accept a gift of money from him on account of his character. He is probably the same person who put an end to his life under the emperor Nero, whose name was evidently corrupted into C. Aminius Rebius.

=== Caninii Galli ===
- Lucius Caninius Gallus, tribune of the plebs in 56 BC, and a friend of Cicero.
- Lucius Caninius L. f. Gallus, consul in 37 BC.
- Lucius Caninius L. f. L. n. Gallus, consul suffectus in 2 BC, and probably triumvir monetalis in 12 BC.
- Lucius Caninius Gallus, a Roman senator during the time of Tiberius, served as curator of the banks and channels of the Tiber.

=== Others ===
- Aulus Caninius Satrius, mentioned by Cicero in 65 BC.
- Caninius Sallustius, quaestor of Marcus Calpurnius Bibulus, the proconsul of Syria; one of Cicero's letters is addressed to him. He may have been adopted into the Caninia gens, or possibly his name is corrupt, and should read C. Annius Sallustius or Cn. Sallustius.
- Caius Caninius Onesimus was a veteran of the Praetorian Guard (cohortis VIII praetoriae), lived 63 years and 8 months. Died in Como.
- Titus Caninius, son of Sergius Maximus, was a veteran of the Praetorian Guard (cohortis VI praetoriae), died in Corinium (Gornji Karin), Dalmatia.
- Titus Caninius, commander of the victorious Cohors III Nerviorum in Vindolanda (Chesterholm), Britannia.
- Lucius Caninius Publius, son of Valentius and father of Caius, was procurator of public works (procuratori operum publicorum) in the province of Africa and died in Roccaverano in Regio IX Liguria.
- Caius Caninius Germanus, veteran and centurion of the classis Ravennas died at the age of 90 in Calenzana, Corsica.
- Caninia Longa, a Jewish woman of the early first century.

== See also ==
- List of Roman gentes
