= Publius Clodius Pulcher =

Roman politician and street agitator (93–52 BC)

- Born: c. 92 BC
- Died: 18 January 52 BC; Near Bovillae
- Cause of death: Murdered
Office
Quaestor	61 BC
XVvir sacris faciundis	60–52 BC
Plebeian tribune	58 BC
Curule aedile	56 BC
- Spouse: Fulvia
- Children: Publius and Claudia
- Father: Appius Claudius Pulcher
- Relatives: Appius (brother); Gaius (brother); Clodia (sister; m. Metellus); Clodia (sister; m. Lucullus); Clodia (sister; m. Q. Rex)

Publius Clodius Pulcher (c. 92 – 18 January 52 BC) was a Roman politician and demagogue. A noted opponent of Cicero, he was responsible during his plebeian tribunate in 58 BC for a massive expansion of the Roman grain dole as well as Cicero's exile from the city. Leader of one of the political mobs in the 50s, his political tactics – combining connections throughout the oligarchy with mass support from the poor plebs – made him a central player in the politics of the era.

Born to the influential patrician gens Claudia, he was embroiled early in his political career in a religious scandal which saw him develop a rivalry with the orator Cicero and become a plebeian in order to be eligible for the plebeian tribunate. He successfully stood as tribune of the plebs for 58 BC and passed six laws to restore Rome's collegia (private guilds and fraternities), expand the grain dole (making it free rather than subsidised while also using those collegia as means for distribution), annex Cyprus to pay for the dole, clarify augural law on religious obstruction, make it more difficult for the censors to expel senators from the senate, and exile Cicero for the unlawful execution of conspirators during the Catilinarian conspiracy.

When curule aedile in 56 BC, he feuded with and attempted to prosecute his political enemy, Titus Annius Milo, who controlled a rival set of urban mobs. Starting the year an opponent of Caesar, Pompey, and Crassus, he and his family reconciled with them to form a political alliance. A few years later in 52 BC, amid renewed political violence and a campaign for the praetorship, Milo and Clodius encountered each other on the via Appia outside Rome, where Clodius was killed. His body, brought back to Rome, was brought to the forum and then cremated in the senate house, causing its destruction by fire.

His politics were advanced largely by his cultivation of urban mobs in Rome which, by exercising violent control of the places where the republic operated, furthered his political objectives. These violent tactics, however, were not his only sources of influence: his family connections and nobilitas made him a valuable ally to many parties – including, at various times, Caesar, Cato, and Pompey – in the ad hoc factionalism of the late republic. The older view that Clodius acted as an agent of magnates, such as Caesar or Pompey, is now rejected by scholars; he is now seen as an opportunistic and independent politician.

== Name ==
Later historians speculated that Clodius changed the spelling of his nomen from "Claudius" to "Clodius" to distance himself from his patrician family and curry favor with the plebeians; however, there are no ancient sources that substantiate the idea that he changed his name, or that the two spellings signified patrician vs. plebeian status. Ancient contemporaries like Cicero referred to him as "Clodius" before his plebeian adoption, and Clodius's patrician sisters spelled the names with an O in correspondence throughout their lives. The O-spelling may have also been used by Clodius's uncle in the 90s BC, as well as by his elder brother Gaius, as documented by Cicero.

W. Jeffrey Tatum, in the 1999 book The Patrician Tribune, also notes that Roman politicians did not benefit from reducing social distance between themselves and the plebs: rather, the plebs valued champions who were more noble because it made their causes seem more respectable.

== Early life ==
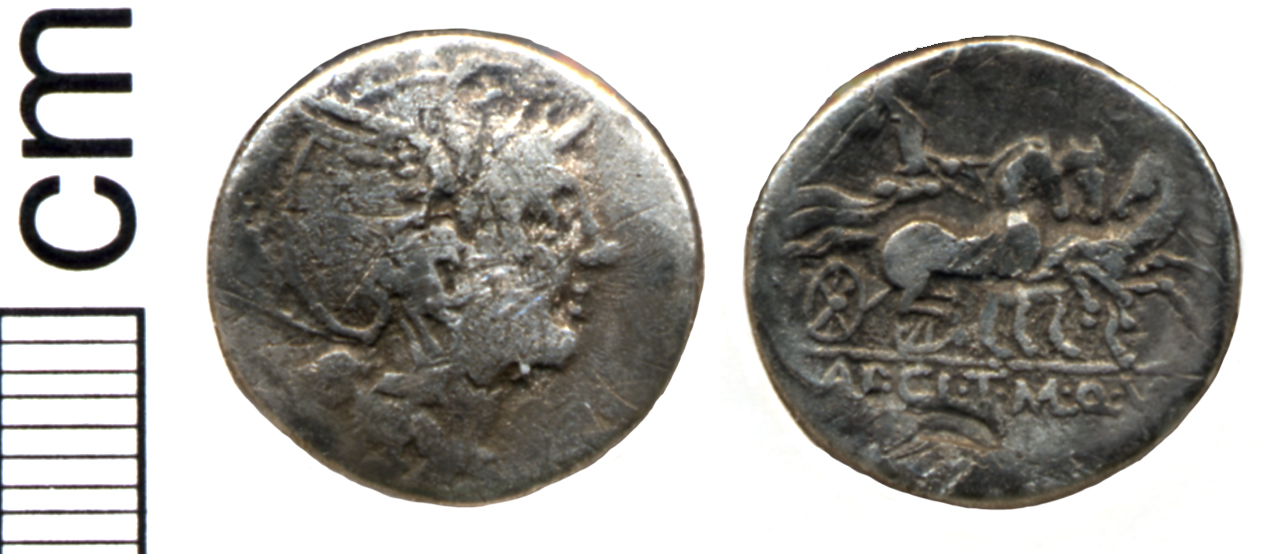
Denarius attributed to, among others, Appius Claudius Pulcher, Clodius' father, minted in 111 or 110 BC. It depicts a helmeted Roma on the obverse with Victory leading a three-horse chariot (triga).

Clodius was born to the patrician gens Claudia. His branch traced its ancestry to shortly after the founding of the republic, with its ancestral patriarch Attus Clausus holding a consulship in 495 BC. The Claudii Pulchri, the branch of the family from which Clodius hailed, descended from Appius Claudius Caecus (censor in 312 BC).

Clodius' father, Appius Claudius Pulcher, was consul in 79 BC and a supporter of Sulla. Shortly after he became proconsul of Macedonia in 77 BC, he died, leaving three sons. The youngest of these sons was Publius Clodius; his two elder brothers were Appius and Gaius. He also had three sisters all named Clodia: the eldest was the wife of Quintus Caecilius Metellus Celer; the second daughter wed Lucius Licinius Lucullus; the third wed Quintus Marcius Rex. The identity of Clodius' mother is disputed, as is the precise relationship between the sons of father Appius and the two Metelli (Celer and Nepos).

=== Early career ===
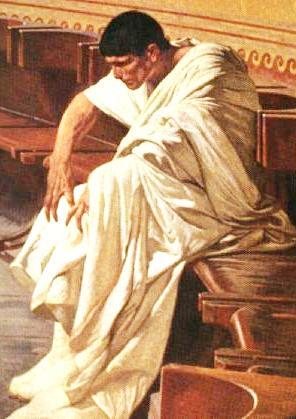
Fictitious portrait of Catiline, the leader of the Catilinarian conspiracy, in the painting Cicero denounces Catiline in the Roman senate by Cesare Maccari (19th century)

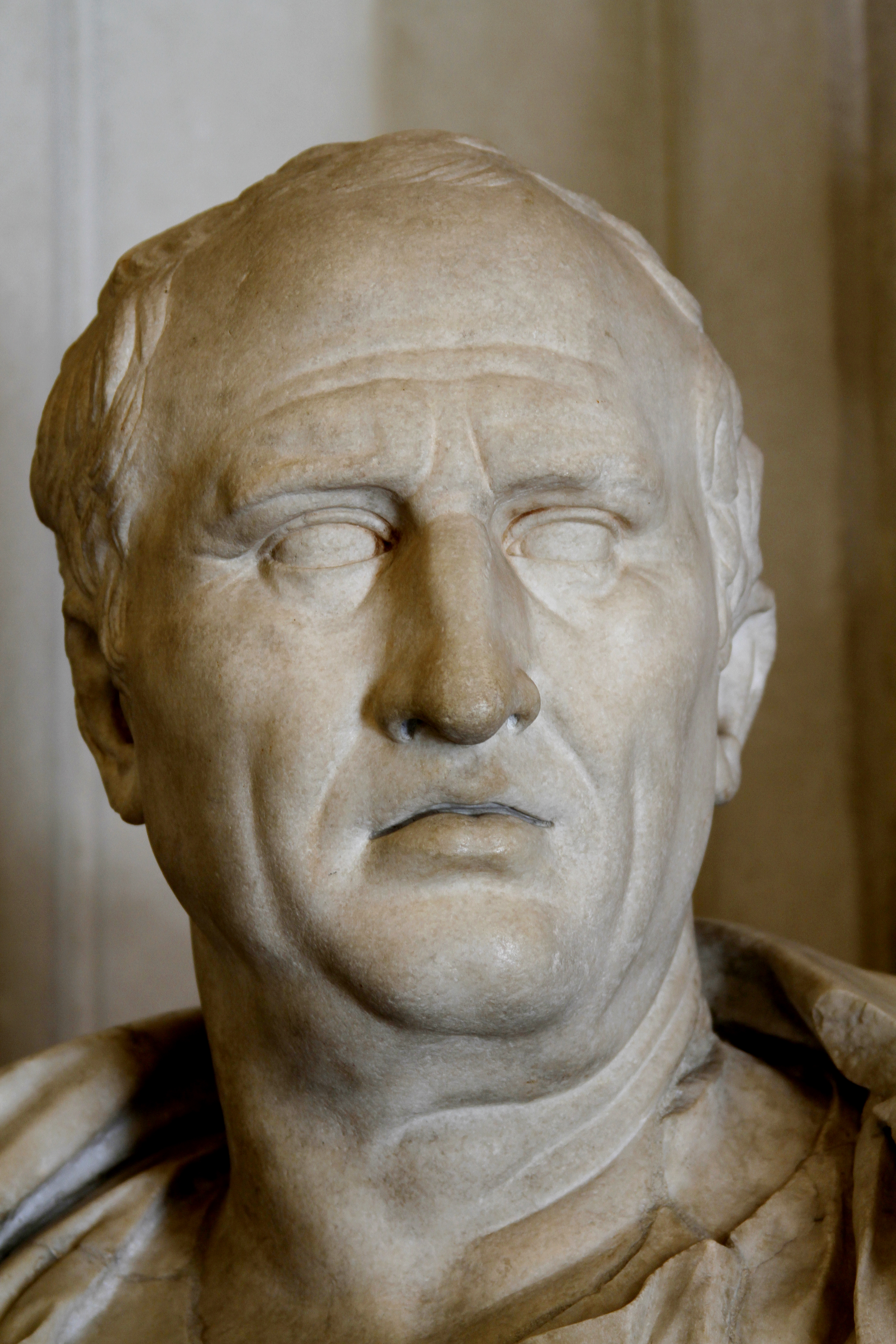
Portrait of Cicero from the 1st century AD, currently in the Capitoline Museums. Clodius likely supported Lucius Licinius Murena and Cicero during the crisis.

Clodius first concretely enters the historical record serving under Lucullus, his brother-in-law, during the Third Mithridatic War. T R S Broughton, in Magistrates of the Roman republic places him possibly as a legate under Lucullus in 68 BC. During that year, he encouraged soldiers to mutiny when wintering at Nisbis in Armenia. Per Plutarch, he likely acted on personal motives, rather than as part of a Pompeian plot. The next year, he transferred to serve under the proconsul of Cilicia, Quintus Marcius Rex, who was also Clodius' brother-in-law. In command of the fleet as a prefect, he was defeated and captured. Appealing to Ptolemy, the king of Cyprus, he was ransomed from the pirates or otherwise released as a gesture of good will shortly before Pompey's pan-Mediterranean anti-pirate campaign; Clodius, after his release, reassumed command under Pompey though formally attached to Marcius. He also served in a mission to support the Roman client king of Syria, Philip II Philoromaeus, but was unsuccessful. Exploiting his familial connections to put himself in military positions, his military career was broadly unsuccessful. However, this proved of little consequence politically as Romans usually believed that aristocrats were inherently competent at military affairs.

On Clodius' return to Rome, in 65 BC, he started an unsuccessful prosecution of Lucius Sergius Catilina. While Clodius' bête noire Cicero later claimed that Clodius cooperated with Catiline to make an incompetent prosecution (a crime called praevaricatio), there is little contemporary evidence thereof. The more unbiased source Asconius, in commentaries on Cicero, dismissed the accusation; more recent historians have largely concurred. Catiline's acquittal is sufficiently explained by bribery and deference by the jury to his many consular allies. Around the same time, Clodius also threatened Lucullus with prosecution. Lucullus responded by divorcing his wife Clodia with humiliating public allegations that she engaged in incest with Clodius. The prosecution was shortly thereafter dropped.

Clodius was possibly elected as military tribune for 64 BC. Whether military tribune or not, he served that year on the staff of then-praetor Lucius Licinius Murena who was proconsul of Transalpine Gaul in 64 BC. Nothing concrete is known of Clodius' activities there. When the two returned to Rome in 63 BC, Clodius was involved in Murena's campaign for the consulship and likely helped distribute bribes to voters in the comitia centuriata. At the ensuing trial of Murena that year, Cicero in Pro Murena may have defended Clodius' role in Murena's campaign and there is no evidence at all that Clodius was involved in the Catilinarian conspiracy that year. Clodius' support for Murena and his connection with Quintus Marcius Rex – who was assigned a command in Italy to suppress Catiline's revolt – indicates that he was likely an opponent of the conspirators.

=== Bona Dea affair ===
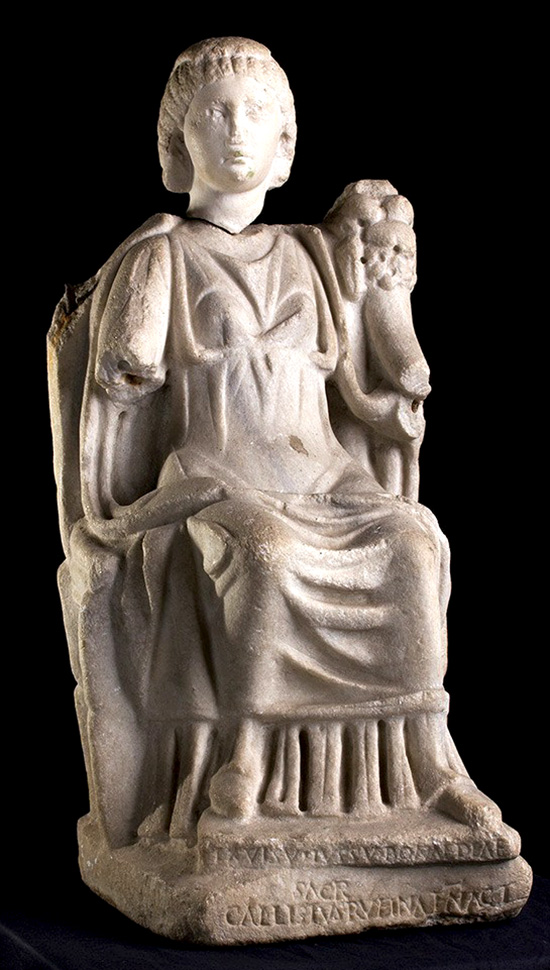
Statue of Bona Dea, the goddess whose rites in the pontifex maximus' house Clodius infiltrated

The next year, in 62 BC, Clodius stood successfully for the quaestorship. Up to this point, Clodius' career was largely conventional. Prior, however, to his taking office, he was involved in a scandal where some time in December 62 BC he infiltrated the female-only secret rites of the Bona Dea in the house of the pontifex maximus, Julius Caesar. His motives for this are unclear and muddled by invective. The sacrilege was initially ignored. Around six months passed before a meeting of the senate in May forced the matter to be brought to the pontifices who declared it sacrilegious; the senate, following religious law, then dutifully set up a tribunal. To that end, the senate advised the consuls to pass a law to establish a special tribunal to prosecute Clodius for the crime of incestum; the crime, which normally covered only incest and sexual relations with Vestal Virgins, was here extended to include Clodius' sacrilege in a loose analogy with an assault on the Vestal's chastity. To signal its importance, the senate also shut down public business until the people ratified the tribunal.

Clodius had two allies: one of the consuls, Marcus Pupius Piso Frugi Calpurnianus, and one of the plebeian tribunes, Quintus Fufius Calenus. They argued that the law, by appointing jurors via the urban praetor rather than by lot, violated due process and constituted an illegal senatorial usurpation of the jurors' roles. Piso, as the formal proposer, opposed his own law in speeches and by shenanigans: with a mob led by Clodius' ally Gaius Scribonius Curio, Piso and his supporters seized the voting stalls and then handed out only negative ballots. After a motion in the senate to repeal the decree to establish the tribunal, brought by Curio's homonymous father (who had been consul in 76 BC), failed 400–15, Clodius and his allies took to the streets. Amid orations connecting the senate's tribunal to Cicero's illegal execution of citizens just a few months earlier during the Catilinarian conspiracy, those supporting the bill eventually accepted selection by lot. Two motions dividing the matters in the senate – first whether a tribunal should be established and second whether it should have its jury appointed by the praetor – were brought. The first motion passed; the second was defeated; and a new bill, brought by tribune Fufius with the jury selected by lot, then passed in the assembly.

The prosecution at the trial was led by Lucius Cornelius Lentulus Crus – joined by other Cornelii Lentuli arrayed in an alliance against Clodius – and the main advocate for the defence was Curio's father who had been consul in 76 BC. While the trial is not well documented, Clodius is alleged to have obstructed interrogation of his slaves by selling them to his brother or moving them to Gaul. Character witnesses, including Lucullus, attacked Clodius' character. Julius Caesar's mother and sister (Aurelia and Julia) testified to Clodius' presence. Curio produced a resident of the town of Interamna, who swore that Clodius was not present in Rome during the rites. Cicero contradicted this alibi, which according to Valerius Maximus was Clodius' only defence; this testimony under oath became the root of the enmity between Clodius and Cicero. Worried about violence against the jurors, the senate decreed their protection. However, after the jurors voted 31 to 25 to acquit, the decision was immediately condemned as a product of bribery.

If bribes were paid, the monies were provided by Clodius, who Cicero later claimed had almost bankrupted himself in paying them. While Marcus Licinius Crassus has been suggested as bankrolling Clodius' bribes, many scholars believe there is insufficient evidence to prove or disprove his involvement. Julius Caesar divorced his wife Pompeia in the aftermath of the trial, skilfully avoiding offending Clodius and ridding himself of the matter. Scholars are divided as to whether Clodius was involved in an affair with Pompeia: W Jeffrey Tatum rejects it as an unnecessary elaboration while John W Rich believes Caesar's divorce indicates uncertainty as to her complicity.

=== Transitio ad plebem ===
The Bona Dea affair damaged Clodius' political aspirations. He expected to accompany the consul Piso on the latter's proconsular governorship of Syria as quaestor; the senate, showing its anger at Piso and Clodius, revoked Piso's assignment. Clodius eventually was assigned to a quaestorian post in Sicily under its propraetor, Gaius Vergilius Balbus, and he returned to Rome by June 60 BC after a short tour of duty. After the affair Clodius started plans to become a plebeian so to stand for the plebeian tribunate (patricians were ineligible). He attempted to effect the transfer through three serial schemes.

The first was the passage of legislation in the centuriate assembly which would reassign him to the plebs. Two of his political allies brought legislation in 60 BC to that effect on his behalf: Gaius Herrenius, then plebeian tribune, and Quintus Caecilius Metellus Celer, then consul. However, both bills stalled under vetos from the other plebeian tribunes, likely on political or religious grounds. On his return to the city, Clodius then underwent a sacrorum detestatio on 24 May 60 BC, a poorly understood religious rite before the comitia calata. Clodius evidently believed that this rite was sufficient to render him a plebeian; Metellus Celer, the consul, disagreed strenuously and that consular opinion was ratified by the senate after a debate in early June, ending this attempt as well.

Clodius initially opposed the strategy of having himself adopted by a plebeian and then immediately liberated from his adoptive father. But the next year, 59 BC, during the consulship of Gaius Julius Caesar and Marcus Calpurnius Bibulus, an opportunity arose. After a forensic speech by Cicero which included attacks on the political alliance between Caesar, Pompey, and Crassus, Caesar and Pompey immediately arranged a session of the comitia curiata to approve Clodius' adoption and emancipation by one Publius Fonteius (a twenty-year-old man who was younger than Clodius). After this political stunt from Caesar and Pompey, Cicero, suitably intimidated, withdrew to his Italian villa. With religious objections nullified by Caesar and Pompey, who were respectively pontifex maximus and augur, Clodius became plebeian and shortly thereafter stood for the plebeian tribunate.

In the aftermath of the adoption, Clodius supported Caesar and Pompey. He spoke in favour of the lex Vatinia which appointed Caesar to his Gallic command in April; he also anticipated appointment either to Caesar's land commission or to an embassy to Ptolemy XII Auletes. When neither appointment was forthcoming, Clodius broke with his erstwhile benefactors. Seizing on their unpopularity due to their violent political tactics, Clodius declared his opposition to Caesar. Caesar attempted to rescind the adoption to prevent Clodius' tribunician election but this carried no weight; senators, even including Cicero, were pleased to see Clodius – along with Clodius' friends Curio and Metellus Nepos – draw up against Caesar. Clodius also started to move against his bête noire Cicero, but Pompey, who still maintained good relations with Clodius, interceded on Cicero's behalf.

== Tribunate ==
At the tribunician elections of summer 59 BC (for terms from December 59 to 58), Clodius was easily successful. Between the election and the start of his term in December, the Vettius affair saw an estrangement between Pompey and Cicero; the later consular elections also saw the election of two consuls: Lucius Calpurnius Piso, Caesar's father-in-law, and Aulus Gabinius, a longtime friend of Pompey. Clodius responded by changing tact again and, in support of Caesar and Pompey, vetoed Bibulus' customary speech when leaving the consulship.

=== Clodius' legislative programme ===
On the first day of his term as tribune, 10 December 59 BC, he announced four major pieces of legislation. Their extent and breadth indicated they had been workshopped for some time, probably starting in July 59 BC. They were the lex Clodia de collegiis, lex Clodia frumentaria, lex Clodia de obnuntiatione, and lex Clodia de censoria notione. They were to be put before the people in the new year, January 58 BC. As a whole, the legislation produced for Clodius a broadly popular base of support while also securing the support of many senators, especially the numerous but not-individually-influential pedarii.

==== Collegial law ====
The senate had prohibited a number of colleges (Latin: collegia) which included both professional associations as well as religious organisations. A few of these organisations – "it is no longer reasonable to conclude that all but a few... were made illegal" – were banned in 64 BC by a senatorial decree. These colleges were revived by Clodius' law and, by enrolment in a centralised recording of the whole city's colleges, sanctioned by the state. Reviving the colleges also allowed men like Clodius and his associate Sextus Cloelius to serve as financial patrons and cultivate connections with the urban masses.

==== Grain law ====
Clodius also used the opportunity to greatly expand the grain dole. Instead of importing corn and selling it at a subsidised rate, as introduced by Gaius Gracchus, the ration of five modii would now be free for citizens at Rome. The responsibility of getting this grain to Rome was largely delegated to provincial magistrates and the expense of it imposed a heavy burden on state finances, expanding on the already expensive provisions of Marcus Porcius Cato's enlarged grain dole in 62 BC.

The colleges reestablished in Clodius' first law may have played a role in distributing this grain, since it enrolled people eligible to receive this grain into various districts in Rome. Regardless, the free food guaranteed by the law won Clodius enduring support among the urban poor. Its burdens on the treasury, however, were huge: the senate decreed a special minting of coins just to pay for that year's expenses. Clodius also found it possible to raise more money from the provinces, passing a law taking payment from Brogitarus of Galatia and certain Byzantine exiles to restore their statuses in their home countries; bills restoring these men would be passed through the year. More money was also to be raised from the Ptolemaic kingdom in Cyprus, which Clodius ordered seized and annexed. He initially had annexation assigned to the existing province of Cilicia: whoever would be appointed to that open proconsulship would find themselves with an extremely profitable remit.

==== Augural law ====
In the previous year, Caesar's consular colleague Marcus Calpurnius Bibulus withdrew to his house, probably in May, to obstruct Caesar's legislation by announcing observation of unfavourable auspices. Bibulus continuously announced that he was watching the skies and then sent messages in absentia to other magistrates reporting unfavourable omens. Such unfavourable auspices if properly reported would have stopped the holding of an assembly; because such assemblies were held anyway, Bibulus and his supporters purported such results were invalid. The validity of these obstruction tactics, however, is mostly rejected by scholars, who emphasise not only that the senate at the time dismissed these claims in multiple different debates but also that the lex Aelia et Fufia required that unfavourable omens be reported in person to the presiding official to have effect.

Clodius' augural law is not well-developed in the ancient sources. It is, however, generally agreed that Clodius' law did not rise to Cicero's exaggerations, which claimed that the lex Aelia et Fufia were repealed. The law instead targeted the narrow question of whether Bibulus' announcement of unfavourable omens in absentia would be permissible, answering that question negatively. The possible precedent of permitting a magistrate to shut down the government through edicts issued from bed was seen by all, Bibulus' supporters included, as unacceptable: the senate rejected this position in 59 BC, did so again at a debate on Caesar's legislation early in 58, and the people too rejected it by passing this lex Clodia. However, the bill was specifically framed to sidestep the validity of Bibulus' obnuntiations in 59: it would only apply prospectively.

==== Censorial law ====
Roman censors long had powers to remove someone from the senate by omitting that name from the list of senators. Clodius' lex de censoria notione required both censors to agree to remove someone from the senate and give cause with opportunity for a hearing. This limited the possibility that censors strip tribunes of their seats in the senate as a weapon against them. Moreover, due to the lenient census in 61 BC, there were likely fears among junior members of the senate – especially those who never held senior magistracies, the pedarii, – that censors might want to trim the senatorial rolls. This legislation, although exaggerated by Cicero into the claim that Clodius abolished the censors, was broadly popular among the numerous but individually-unimportant pedarii.

=== Passage and exile of Cicero ===
At the beginning of the year, Cicero announced his opposition and found in one of the tribunes that year – Lucius Ninnius Quadratus – an ally. In Dio's version, Ninnius threatened a veto against all of Clodius' bills; given the impossibility of sustaining a veto against the kind of strong popular support expected for a grain bill, it is more likely Ninnius threatened only Clodius' collegial bill on the grounds that it overturned the considered decision of the senate in 64 BC. However, Clodius reached a deal with Cicero, agreeing not to pursue his feud if Cicero would call Ninnius off. This deal, reached with the support of the senatorial elite, allowed Clodius to push through his four laws on 4 January 58 BC.

The extent of popular support behind Clodius first became visible when Clodius interceded in the trial of Publius Vatinius, a Caesarian ally in 59 BC and legate recently returned from Gaul. Making his intercession evident, Clodius summoned a mob which entirely disrupted the prosecutorial proceedings, overturned the praetor's benches, and smashed the jury's voting urns. This first instance of popular violence and the role of the colleges in organising may have been a surprise to Clodius – there is little evidence that Clodius intended his collegial law to produce urban mobs at his beck and call – but he quickly came to capitalise on this new tactic. In February, Clodius put forward two further bills. The first would assign to the current consuls, Piso and Gabinius, to the provinces of Macedonia and Syria respectively. The second would reaffirm citizen rights to provocatio and retroactively punish any magistrate who had killed a citizen without trial, along with senators who so advised a magistrate, with exile. The latter law, the lex Clodia de capite civis Romani, was clearly targeted at Cicero. Cicero and his ally Ninnius responded by adopting mourning dress; the senate soon decreed such dress as well. The consuls, however, ignored the decree, prohibited equestrian allies of Cicero from addressing the senate, and supported the bill in public.

Clodius put his mobs on Cicero and disrupted his rallies with violence, arousing concern among the senators at large. Clodius defanged this backlash, however, by reassigning the annexation of Cyprus and restoration of Byzantine exiles to Marcus Porcius Cato – who in 63 BC was one of the most forceful supporters of executing the Catilinarian conspirators – with the title pro quaestore pro praetore. Cicero saw this as a ploy to remove Cato from the city and cause him to accept Clodius' adoption and tribunician laws, the traditional judgement among classicists. However, other classicists have instead seen the assignment as Clodius negotiating a deal or compromising with Cato and allies – signalling that Clodius had no ill-will against senators who had supported Cicero in 63 BC – therefore isolating Cicero. With Cicero rejecting a lifeline from Caesar, who offered to appoint him as one of his legates and thereby give him immunity from prosecution, Cicero withdrew from the city into exile; Clodius immediately passed a lex Clodia de exsilio Ciceronis which exiled the orator, confiscated his house on the Palatine to be turned into a shrine to the goddess Libertas, and prohibited the senate or people from recalling the orator.

=== Opposition to Pompey ===
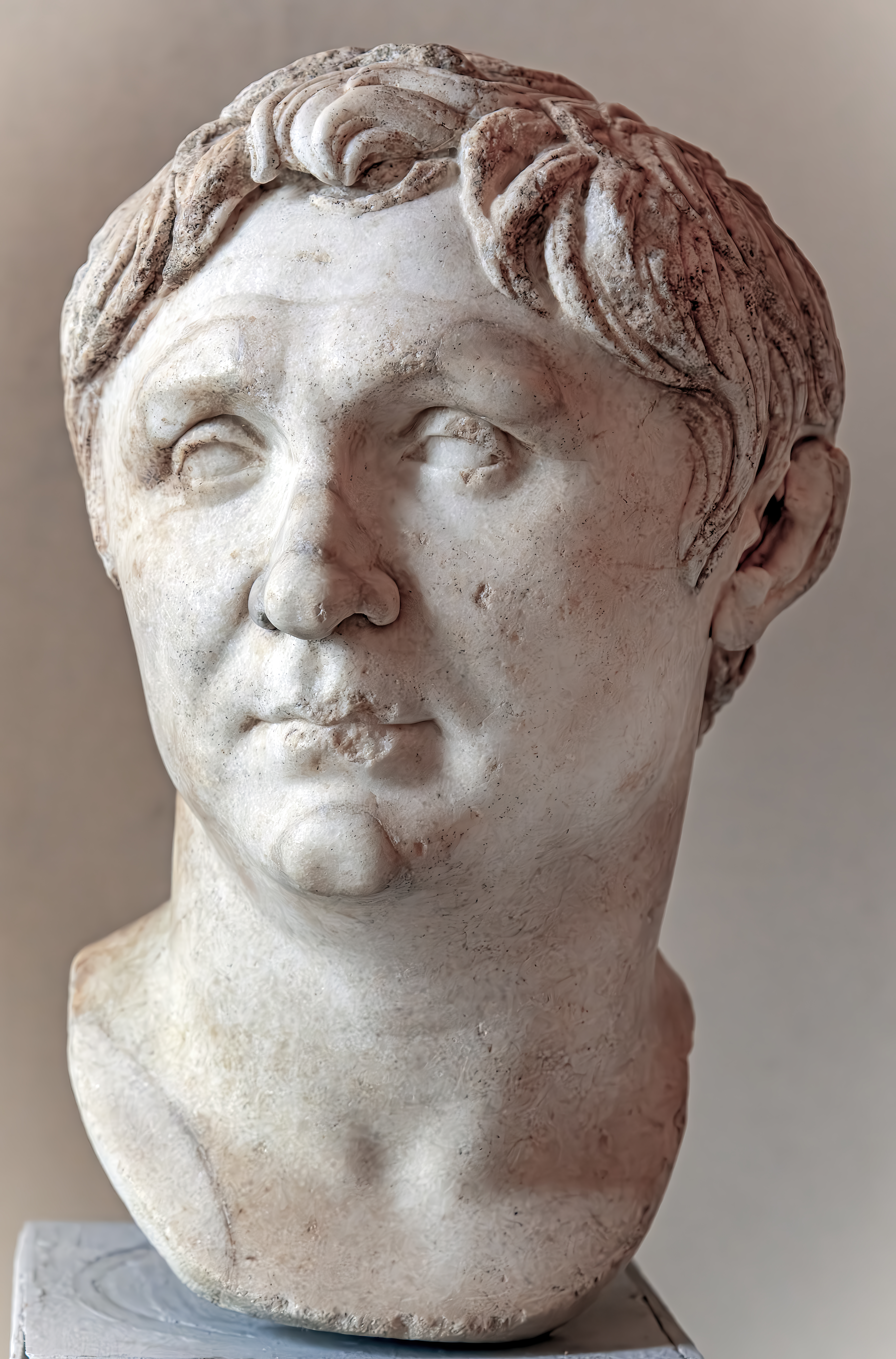
Clodius at various times supported or opposed Pompey (pictured above). His activities late in his tribunate, however, generated sufficient backlash to place Pompey on firm political ground; Pompey struck back politically the next year, 57 BC.

The success of Clodius' four laws provided him huge political support. This support, especially with his inadvertent discovery of mob power at the prosecution of Vatinius, made it possible for him to continue as an independent political agent. Setting himself against Pompey, Clodius moved to advance his support from the senators suspicious of the general. Setting his target on Pompey's eastern settlements, Clodius promulgated a bill to upset Pompey's favour to Deiotarus, tetrarch of Galatia, who Pompey had appointed high priest at Pessinus; removing Deiotarus from the priest, Clodius instead elevated Brogitarus – Deiotarus' son-in-law and ruler of a separate Galatian kingdom – while also declaring Brogitarus a Roman ally. This intervention did not reshape Roman policy in the east, which would have been unacceptable for such a junior magistrate to do. But the senate was happy to see Pompey's decisions unsettled; nor was a veto forthcoming from a tribune would be unable to find support to deny constituents their own popular sovereignty.

Clodius also kidnapped a princely hostage that Pompey had taken to Rome. The prince, the homonymous son of Tigranes II of Armenia, was taken by Clodius from the house of one of the praetors and put on a ship to Armenia. Driven back by a storm, a bloody clash between Clodius and the praetor's retinues occurred on the via Appia which saw the praetor's retinue defeated. After the clash, which resulted in at least one fatality, Pompey and Clodius broke politically. Pleased by Pompey's embarrassment, the senate did nothing. Pompey's response to Clodius relied on his ally in the consulship, Aulus Gabinius. But here, Clodius' gangs overreached when they fell on the consul's retinue and destroyed his fasces. With Clodius formally consecrating Gabinius' property to the plebeian goddess Ceres, he clearly approved of his attack on consular authority; this was unacceptable to the political class: "too severe a threat to public order"; "a step too far". Ninnius consecrated Clodius' property in retaliation and on the first day of June brought a bill to recall Cicero from exile that was supported unanimously in the senate but promptly vetoed. Through other men, a movement grew over the next year to lift Cicero's exile, of which Pompey eventually took the head.

Later in the year, Clodius also signalled his support for Cato's faction in its continuing fight against Caesar's legislation, arguing publicly that Caesar's laws in 59 were religiously invalid. It is likely he did so in an attempt to induce members of Cato and Bibulus' group to support him in preventing Cicero's return. An event on 11 August 58 BC also saw one of Clodius' slaves confess to having been ordered to assassinate Pompey. Although it is not clear whether this attempt was real, Pompey, who was paranoid of attempts on his life, then shut himself in his villa. Clodius responded by having his gangs menace the villa for the rest of the year. The opposition to Clodius, led by Pompey and Cicero's friends with their leaders either shut in at home or shut out abroad, yet continued to gain ground through the year. Eight of the ten tribunes in October brought a bill to recall Cicero together – it was again vetoed – and eventually the opposition decided to wait Clodius out since his term ended in December.

== Shifting alliances ==
=== Opposition to recalling Cicero ===
On 10 December 58 BC, Clodius returned to being a private citizen. Pompey's allies in the tribunate promptly proposed a bill to recall Cicero; eventually, all but two of the tribunes would support the bill. In January 57 BC, the two new consuls – Publius Cornelius Lentulus Spinther and Quintus Caecilius Metellus Nepos – announced in the senate that they supported or acceded to Cicero's return. Seeing the senate again support Cicero, one of Clodius allies in the tribunate – Sextus Atilius Serranus Gavianus – exercised a veto in the senate which continued through January. When the bill to lift Cicero's exile came to a vote on 23 January 57 BC, two tribunes – Quintus Fabricius and Marcus Cispius – occupied the forum to prevent a veto from being raised. Clodius' gangs, strengthened by gladiators borrowed from his brother, then drove the tribunes from the forum by force; Cicero's brother Quintus, attending to support his brother, narrowly escaped the fighting alive. Another tribune, Titus Annius Milo, had the gladiators arrested and procured confessions, but Serranus had them freed; Milo and Clodius from this point became rivals.

The political class unified against the Clodius' violent tactics on 23 January. Milo prosecuted Clodius under the lex Plautia de vi but Clodius' allies in office – Metellus Nepos as consul, Appius Claudius Pulcher as praetor, and one of the tribunes (Sextus Atilius Serranus or Quintus Numerius Rufus) – made it impossible for Clodius to be tried by reserving all days in the calendar for other business. Clodius' tactical superiority in the streets was then lost when further violence against another tribune, Publius Sestius, saw multiple politicians assemble mobs to arm themselves. Pompey, supporting Cicero, canvassed for support across Italy and procured through Spinther a senatorial decree that citizens should to assemble in Rome to vote for Cicero's recall. By the summer, with much of Italy supporting Cicero's recall, Clodius' last remaining tools to oppose the recall were food riots. When the senate voted on lifting Cicero's exile in July, the measure passed 416–1 with Clodius the lone dissenter. Against such overwhelming support, Clodius' allies in the tribunate became unwilling to veto the bill as it proceeded in the senate or the senate's later decree that anyone who blocked the bill would be declared public enemies.

On 4 August 57 BC, Clodius attempted to disrupt a public meeting where Quintus Cicero, brought by Pompey, was to speak in favour of lifting his brother's exile. Unsuccessful, the bill passed later that day before the comitia centuriata amid a huge influx of Ciceronean supporters from across Italy. Pompey's victory in recalling Cicero was made more complete when the senate, at Cicero's motion, gave Pompey a command to bring food to Rome to stop the riots. Clodius and Cicero again opposed each other over Cicero's attempt to have his Palatine house restored. Before a pontifical hearing, Clodius and Cicero spoke, with Clodius arguing that removing the shrine to liberty would offend the gods. Cicero argued successfully that Clodius' law to take his house, in failing to explicitly authorise dedication, was null and void. After Cicero's victory before the pontiffs, Clodius first attempted to convince the public that the decree was actually in his favour before attempting to filibuster a senatorial debate on Cicero's house. When the senatorial resolution was vetoed by Serranus after passing almost unanimously, the overwhelming senatorial response convinced Serranus to withdraw his veto. Unsuccessful lawfully, Clodius responded by mobilising his mobs to disrupt construction work on the site as well as harass Cicero, Milo, and others in the streets. Clodius' defeats were, however, largely momentary. He retained the support of eminent men such as Publius Sulla and Quintus Hortensius; the ongoing political battle over the Egyptian command would again bring Clodius into political respectability.

=== Egypt and political return ===
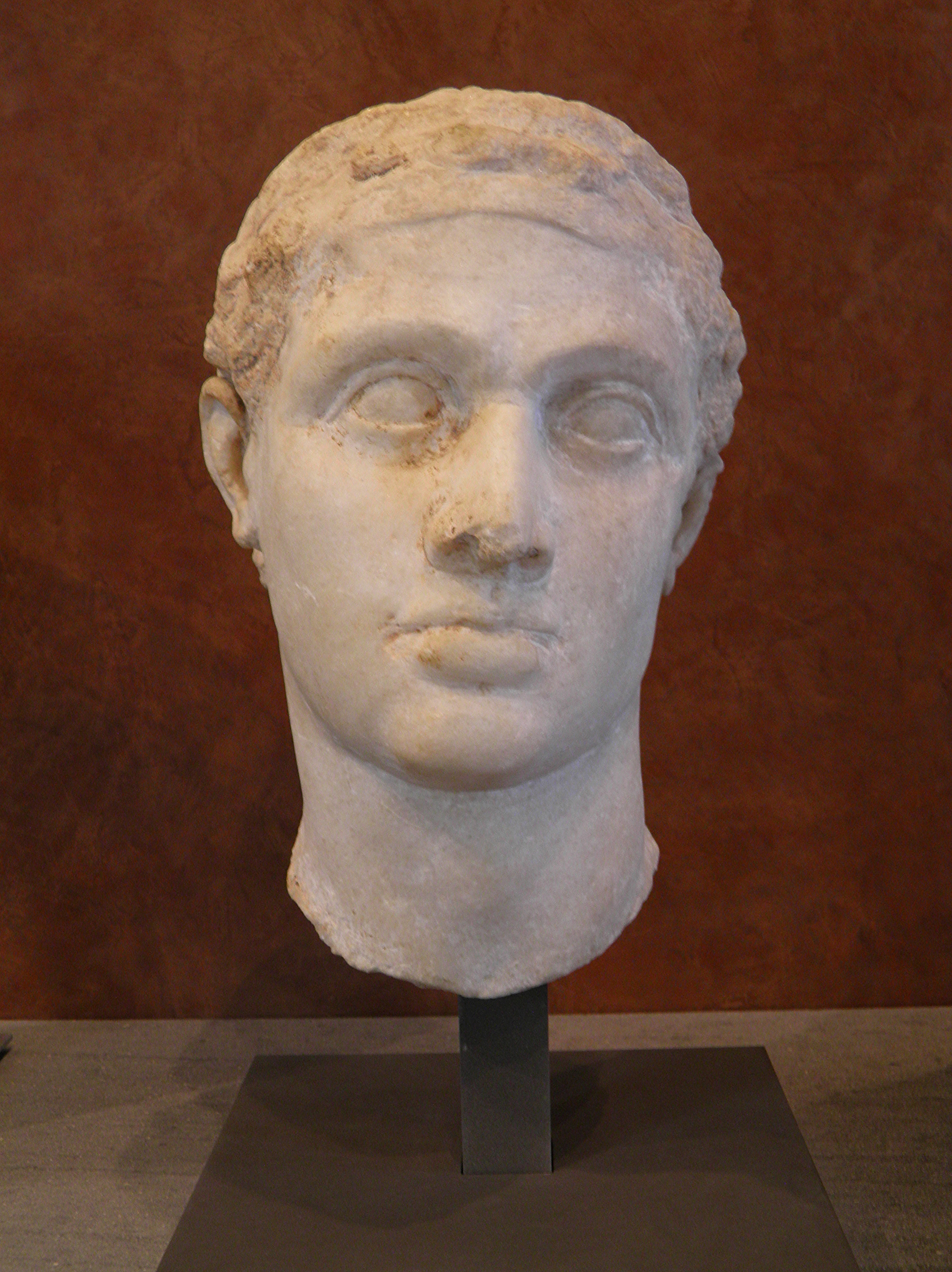
Ptolemy XII Auletes came to Rome to lobby for his restoration to the Egyptian throne. Clodius joined an anti-Pompeian alliance with Gaius Cato to obstruct Pompey's attempts to secure the Egyptian command.

Ptolemy XII Auletes was deposed in 57 BC. He personally pled at Rome for intervention to restore him to the Egyptian throne. An official friend of Rome and massively in debt to many senators, Roman political and economic interests aligned to support such an expedition. Even after Ptolemy tried to have some delegates from the new Alexandrine regime assassinated, Roman support for him remained firm. The senate decreed in September 57 that the consul Spinther, who was shortly be proconsul of Cilicia and Cyprus, should restore Ptolemy; Spinther, supported publicly by Pompey and earnestly by Cicero, left in November to take up his province. The next month, however, saw renewed wrangling over who would lead the Roman response, with Pompey's name floated, probably at his covert insistence. Pompey's enemies in the senate therefore found new use for Clodius' anti-Pompeian agitation.

Clodius' enemies, seeing that he would almost certainly win election as aedile and therefore imminently become immune from prosecution, sought to prosecute and convict him quickly for public violence. The consul-designate Gnaeus Cornelius Lentulus Marcellinus tried to float a prosecution in the senate but it was filibustered; Titus Milo responded by indicting Clodius and announcing that he would delay elections by obnuntiation until Clodius was prosecuted. The consul Metellus Nepos attempted to hold elections on 19 November, supported by Clodius' gangs, but Milo's gangs won the battle and elections were postponed. The next day, Metellus Nepos attempted to sneak past Milo to the campus Martius so that Milo could not report obnuntiation in person; after Milo caught the consul sneaking on back streets and reported his bad omens, elections were again called off.

When the new tribunes came into office on 10 December, Lucius Caninius Gallus promulgated a bill to transfer Spinther's command to Pompey. This placed Clodius' political usefulness back to the fore, especially when Clodius had a friend among the tribunes, Gaius Porcius Cato. The issue of trying Clodius was forcibly dropped around the same time: the quaestors resigned without replacement on 4 December; because they appointed the jury, there could no trial. When Marcellinus, Lucius Marcius Philippus (also consul-elect in 57 BC), and Cicero attempted to have the senate direct the praetor to appoint the jury instead, Clodius' gangs disrupted the meeting. Metellus Nepos also directed as consul that no praetor could constitute a jury without the quaestors, a bar at least until 31 December. Eventually, into the new year with the political threat of Pompey looming, the senate approved elections that returned Clodius as aedile in 56 BC.

=== Aedilate ===
Elections for the aedilate of 56 BC were late, occurring on 20 January that year. Clodius, due to his popularity, was elected first. While many expected Clodius to repeat his largesse from his tribunician term, his financial resources seemed to have been largely exhausted, with his term seeing only the customary games and public works.

The early months of 56 were again consumed by the question of the Egyptian command. Early in the same year a religious sign came when lightning hit the statue of Jupiter on the Alban mount. Clodius, as one of the quindecimviri sacris faciundis, helped interpret this omen. The priests announced an oracle which warned against supporting or opposing the king of Egypt while also prohibiting the king's restoration "with a crowd". The allies of Pompey and Spinther denounced the oracle as a fraud; the senators generally, however, accepted it since it precluded both men from military glory. The debate was eventually called off without settlement after a series of complex parliamentary manoeuvres from mid-January through to early February.

Clodius, as aedile, also prosecuted Milo in February for public violence before a iudicium populi: a popular trial before the assembled people. Milo was defended in the trial by Cicero, Marcus Claudius Marcellus, and Pompey. When Pompey spoke on 7 February, the trial descended into disorder with Clodius' crowd chanting lewd slogans along with the claim that Crassus should be appointed to go to Alexandria instead of Pompey. The whole trial was then adjourned after the demonstrations became violent. The senate, in a meeting in the coming days, blamed Milo and Pompey for the disorder, which led Pompey to abandon the plan to commandeer the Egyptian expedition. Spinther, in Cilicia and warned by Cicero that consequences would be severe if he failed in restoring Ptolemy (as was his still-valid directive from August 57), chose inaction. The senate also decreed legislation should be enacted against sodalitates, a form of political organisation which Clodius' collegia evidently were not, on 10 February 56 BC. The same day, a prosecution was started by one Marcus Tullius against Clodius' enemy Publius Sestius, which Cicero and others attributed to Clodius; whether that is the case is doubted. Cicero, joined by Pompey and Crassus, spoke in defence of Sestius, which secured his acquittal. The attacks by Cicero on Caesar, however, triggered a new re-balancing: with the consul Gnaeus Cornelius Lentulus Marcellinus opposing Caesar and the possibility of Lucius Domitius Ahenobarbus being elected consul in 55 also against Caesar, Clodius' elder brother went north to treat with the Gallic proconsul, eventually producing a reconciliation between the Clodii Pulchri and the renewed First Triumvirate.

In the spring of 56, Clodius put on the Megalensian games amid food riots, which continued to embarrass Pompey's handling of the grain supply. But the reconciliation between the Claudii and the triumvirs included a marriage between Pompey's son and Appius' daughter (Clodius' niece): tact was quickly changed to reflect this new relationship. Attacks on Cicero, however, did not end. After a series of prodigies forced the senate to consult haruspices, Clodius with his authority as a quindecimvir sacris faciundis gave speeches blaming the deconsecration of Clodius' shrine to Libertas (Cicero's house) for divine displeasure. Cicero responded by blaming Clodius instead. In a political pause, Cicero with the support of Milo and one of the tribunes, removed and possibly destroyed the tablets recording Clodius' legislation. This, however, was a step too far: in a meeting of the senate shortly after Cato's return from Cyprus, few were willing to accept (especially the influential beneficiary Cato), Cicero's position that Clodius' adoption and thus entire tribunate were invalid.

The year closed with Gaius Cato, supported by Clodius, sustaining a months-long veto on the consular elections (and thus also elections for all the junior magistracies) as part of a ploy to secure the consulship of 55 BC for Pompey and Crassus. The protection of Clodius' gangs was necessary for Gaius Cato, who was repeatedly menaced for the outrageous obstructionism. Amid these extreme political tactics, Pompey and Crassus were able by violence to secure the election of interreges in early 55 and drive, with the help of soldiers on leave from Caesar, their enemies from the consular canvass. While it is not clear whether Clodius participated in the violence that year needed to win Pompey and Crassus their desired electoral outcomes as well as the lex Trebonia that gave them provincial commands, favours from the triumvirs followed. A senatorially-sponsored embassy to the east for Clodius was funded, with Cicero's objections sidelined by a quid pro quo, allowing Clodius to visit the eastern provinces and clients. One of the suspected destinations was Byzantium or the court of Brogitarus, who were expected to pay generously for Clodius' services in 58. Enjoying hospitality befitting a senatorial embassy and replenishing his monetary reserves in the east, Clodius was likely absent from Rome for the rest of 55.

== Death ==
=== Praetorian campaign ===
Clodius returned to Rome in 54 BC, possibly seeking a praetorship in 53. Whether Clodius actually sought the praetorship of 53 is unclear and debated, though many scholars side with Badian's belief that a delay actually occurred. The ongoing censorship, which included many hearings for junior senators the censors wanted removed, cemented among the pedarii the fruits of Clodius' tribunate. Clodius was then involved in a series of trials against Gaius Cato and Marcus Nonius Sufenas, previous Clodian allies during their tribunates. While the sources are unclear as to whether Clodius participated in their defences, the three trials ended in acquittals. Amid further activities in the courts, Clodius won support from defendants and – according to Valerius Maximus – defended one of his prosecutors during the Bona Dea affair; these actions showed a sound mind suitable for court presidency, i.e. a praetor.

54 BC saw Clodius' elder brother Appius elected consul with Lucius Domitius Ahenobarbus, only for them to be thrown into a serious corruption scandal that cut across all existing loyalties. Appius (a friend of the triumvirs) joined with Domitius (an enemy thereof) to support candidates Gaius Memmius (a friend thereof) and Gnaeus Domitius Calvinus (an enemy thereof) as the only nominees for the consulship of 53 in exchange for the two candidates procuring fabricated legal documents to grant the two consuls lucrative proconsular postings. When the plot became public, competing candidates Marcus Aemilius Scaurus and Marcus Valerius Messalla triggered a surge in interest rates as they borrowed to hand out bribes. Distancing himself from his brother who was at the same time helping prosecuting candidate Scaurus for corruption, Clodius defended Scaurus, which saw him speak in Scaurus' defence alongside his enemy Cicero. All four consular candidates were indicted for bribery and elections were delayed until July 53 BC. With none of the candidates withdrawing, Gnaeus Domitius Calvinus and Marcus Valerius Messalla were elected months into the consular term and found themselves with the unenviable task for arranging elections in this disturbed political environment for 52 BC.

Clodius now stood in the praetorian elections for 52 BC; letters from Cicero indicate his success was a foregone conclusion. His campaign – very uncommonly for a republican politician – included a pledge to redistribute freedmen from the four urban tribes into the 31 rural tribes, which would give them far more political power. A more poorly documented proposal, possibly to regulate the informal manumission of slaves, was also brought.

For personal and political reasons, Clodius was part of the Pompeian effort to deny Titus Annius Milo, a candidate for 52 and friend of Marcus Porcius Cato, victory in the consular elections. Clodius supported the other two candidates: Pompey's ally Publius Plautius Hypsaeus and the blue-blooded Quintus Caecilius Metellus Pius Scipio. Clodius and Milo immediately came to fighting in the streets with their mobs: Clodius attempted to ambush Milo on the via Sacra forcing Milo to flee; Milo repulsed a violent Clodian attempt to seize the voting pens; a young Mark Antony was rumoured to have volunteered to assassinate Clodius to restore order. The chaos of the street fighting, along with a persistent tribunician veto on elections from one of Pompey's tribunician allies (Titus Munatius Plancus), made it impossible to hold elections in 53: the two consuls, entering into office seven months late, abdicated on the last day of their terms without replacement. Appointment of interreges was customary when all magistrates abdicated without replacement. Their appointment too was vetoed, on Pompey's initiative, as Milo's victory was clearly foreseeable. Clodius' campaign for the praetorship continued into the new year, as did the campaigns of the other candidates. Part of his campaign included a visit to Aricia, a town on the via Appia, south of Rome.

=== Encounter with Milo ===
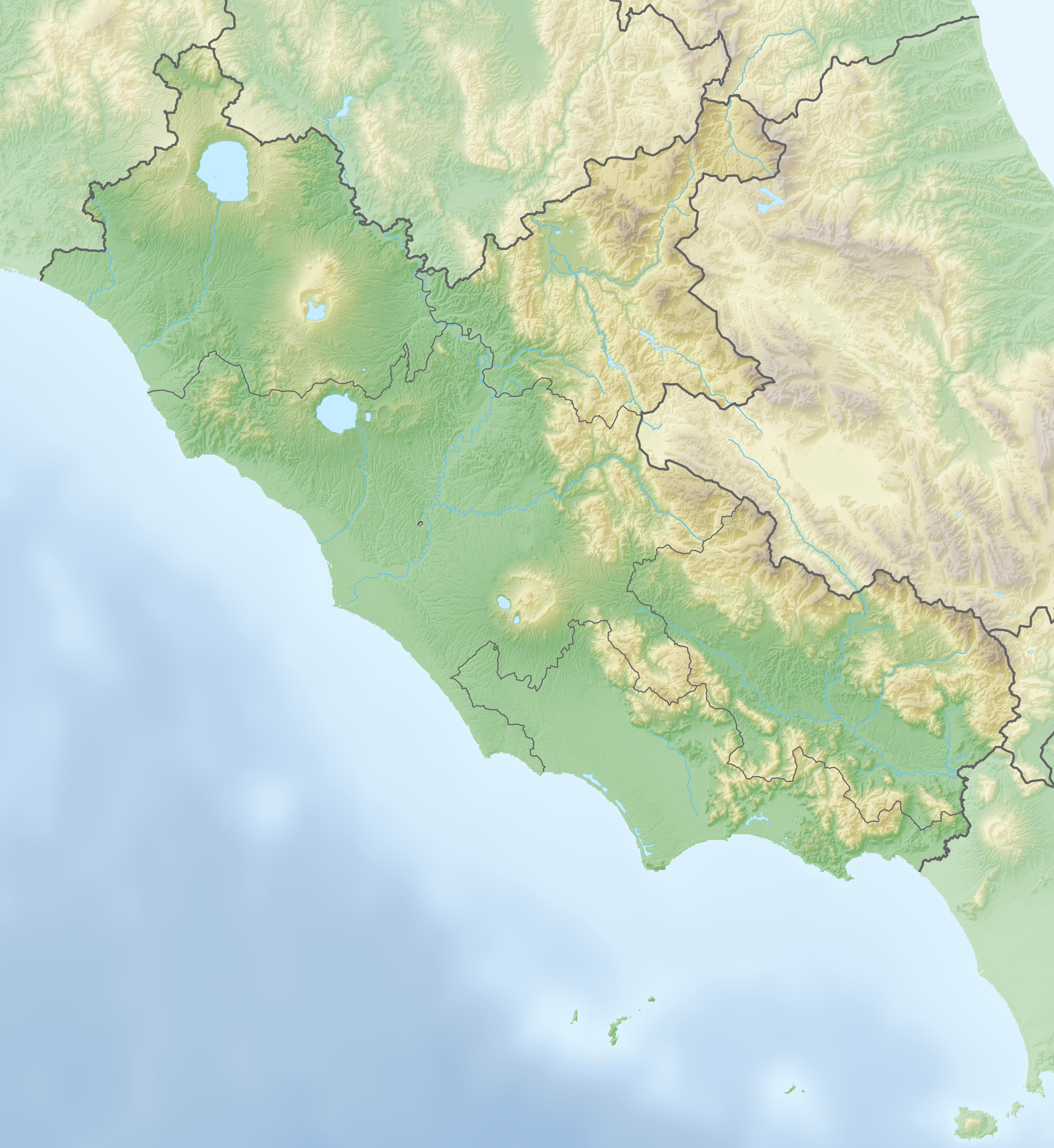
Location of Bovillae relative to Rome on modern relief map of Lazio

The main source for information on Clodius' death is Quintus Asconius Pedianus' commentary on Cicero's Pro Milone; the evidence given in Cicero's speech itself is highly tendentious and should not be taken as a truthful accounting of events. The events as presented by Asconius are broadly as follows. While travelling back from Aricia, Clodius and Milo encountered each other some 13 miles (21 km) south of Rome on the via Appia near Clodius' villa in Bovillae on around 1:30 pm on 18 January 52 BC. Milo was travelling toward Lanuvium, where he was to install a priest. Both men travelled with armed entourages, but Clodius' entourage was smaller: some 26 men to Milo's 300. After the two groups passed in silence, a fight broke out between Clodius and one of the last men in Milo's entourage, leading to Clodius being hit in the shoulder with a javelin. In the resulting fight, Clodius' men were defeated. Clodius was carried to a roadside inn, but when Milo heard that Clodius had been wounded, Milo ordered his lieutenant Marcus Saufeius to kill Clodius: Clodius was dragged out of the inn and stabbed to death. The body was discovered by a senator also travelling on the via Appia, Sextus Teidius, who had it sent to Rome; arriving at Rome around 4:30 pm, the body was brought before Clodius' widow Fulvia.

The story of Clodius' death was almost immediately muddled by partisan invective. Days after the destruction of the curia in Clodius' funeral, Milo and his allies – including his tribunician ally Marcus Caelius Rufus – claimed that Clodius had planned to ambush Milo and that the fight was lawful self-defence. This narrative was the main one spread by Milo's defenders in the aftermath of Clodius' death and forms the core of Cicero's legal defence in Pro Milone. Separately, it was also claimed by Clodius' enemy Marcus Porcius Cato that a senator Marcus Favonius had told Cato that Clodius had related to Favonius that Milo would shortly be dead. A negative version of this narrative also emerged, for example, from Metellus Scipio, who declared in the senate about a month after Clodius' death that Milo had planned the murder. Such narratives were compounded by the feeling among many that Milo was justified not by self-defence from a Clodian trap but also that Clodius' death was simply in the interest of the republic. A pamphlet to that effect was penned by, among others, Marcus Junius Brutus.

=== Funeral and political aftermath ===
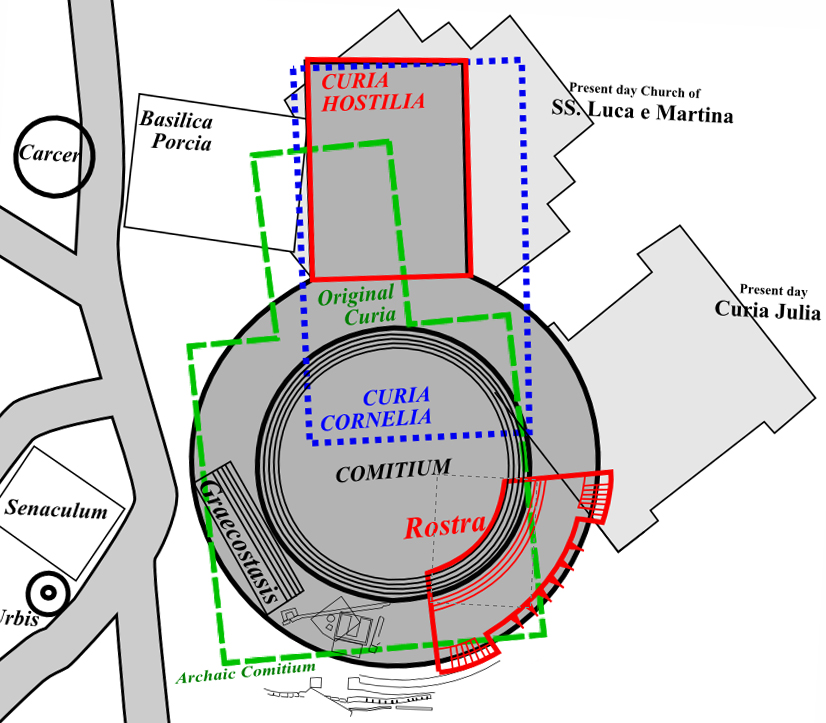
The curia Hostilia was destroyed by fire in Clodius' ad hoc funeral.

The next morning, 19 January, two tribunes aligned with Clodius, Titus Munatius Plancus and Quintus Pompeius Rufus, held a contio in the forum lambasting Milo for the murder. The mob, at Sextus Cloelius' initiative, took Clodius' body into the curia Hostilia. There, with the senate's furniture and records, they cremated the body. The fire spread to the rest of the building, destroying it and the nearby basilica Porcia. Milo, who had fled the city for his safety, returned on news of this excess a few days later; the destruction of this senatorial symbol reversed the public mood; he therefore continued his consular campaign.

The same day, with Pompey and late-Clodius' tribunes away burning the senate house, the senate met on the Palatine within the pomerium at the Temple of Jupiter Stator: without tribunician veto they immediately elected an interrex, Marcus Lepidus. A mob stormed his house demanding immediate elections while Milo's chances were poor, but were refused. As Rome deteriorated into a total breakdown of law and order, the interreges were unable to hold elections; the senate met on 1 February and passed the senatus consultum ultimum, instructing the interrex and Pompey (no normal magistrates in office) to levy and bring soldiers into the city to restore order. After 12 interreges failed to hold elections, Cato and Bibulus brought a compromise, seeking Pompey to be elected as sole consul so to exclude Milo from any chance at victory. With Pompey and late-Clodius' tribunes holding off their vetoes, Pompey was elected by the comitia under interrex Servius Sulpicius Rufus' presidency.

Pompey immediately moved legislation to create a tribunal to try public violence under expedited procedures and to move against electoral corruption. When order was restored, Milo was indicted by Clodius' nephews, the sons of his elder brother Gaius. With the senate precluding the argument that Milo killed Clodius to save the republic by passing a resolution condemning the murder as contra rem publicam and in a trial atmosphere menaced by a mob, Milo was found guilty by 38–13 votes in the jury – some sources describe Cicero, Milo's advocate, being unable to speak in the commotion – and went into exile. Milo's lieutenant Saufeius, the man who committed the actual murder, was acquitted by one vote (26–25) later that year. Cloelius, whose idea it was to cremate Clodius in the curia, was prosecuted and convicted 46–5; the tribunes who helped were also convicted after their terms ended on 10 December 52 BC.

== Legacy ==
In the aftermath of Clodius' death, his political legacy and tactics, which combined aristocratic connections with mass support from the poorer urban plebs, influenced later politicians. Publius Cornelius Dolabella, a patrician by birth and Cicero's son-in-law via Tullia, had himself adopted by a plebeian to stand for the tribunate, succeeding in 47 BC, and that year proposed the complete abolition of debts while raising statues of Clodius to great acclaim. However, the use of political violence in Roman politics was not novel: Clodius was not the first nor the last to assemble mobs to disrupt or support political initiatives. The grain dole which Clodius had legislated during his tribunate survived the fall of the republic and persisted through the Roman empire. Imperial self-representation as builders of public monuments as well as benefactors for freedmen and the urban plebs, "perpetuat[ed] some aspect of [Clodius'] political style".

Clodius' reputation in the later ancient and modern sources is predominantly negative due to the survival of and reliance on Ciceronean invective from around 56 BC. Treatments in modern times have at various times called him "a petty gangster", "an irresponsible demagogue", and "a demagogue of the wildest kind". Modern historiography largely viewed him as an agent of Caesar, an anarchic enigma – for Theodor Mommsen, "an irrational anarchist", – or a revolutionary enemy of Cicero and the senatorial republic. Scholarship since 1966, with the publication of Erich Gruen's P. Clodius: instrument or independent agent? has instead focused on Clodius as an independent agent attempting to play off different groupings in the late republic for personal gain. This independent agent interpretation has been praised as "incisive and penetrating", especially amid the general abandonment of 19th century party-political interpretations of Roman politics.

== Tables and diagrams ==
=== Offices ===
Year (BC)	Office	Note
68	Legate (possibly), Syria	Served under Lucullus
67	Legate (possibly), Cilicia	Served under Quintus Rex
64	Military tribune (possibly)	Served under Murena
61–60	Quaestor, Sicily	
60–52	Quindecimvir sacris faciundis	
58	Plebeian tribune	
56	Curule aedile	

=== Family ===
==== Immediate family ====
Birth order follows McDermott 1970, pp. 39–41. Children which died young are omitted.

- Appius Claudius Pulcher (consul 79 BC)
  - Appius Claudius Pulcher (consul 54 BC)
    - Claudia, wife of Pompey
    - Claudia, wife of Marcus Junius Brutus
  - Gaius Claudius Pulcher
    - Appius Claudius Pulcher (consul 38 BC)
      - Marcus Valerius Messalla Barbatus Appianus
    - Gaius Claudius Pulcher
  - Clodia Tertia, wife of Quintus Marcius Rex
  - Clodia, wife of Metellus Celer
  - Publius Clodius Pulcher
    - Claudia, wife of Octavian
    - Publius Clodius Pulcher
  - Clodia, wife of Lucullus
    - Licinia

==== Stemma ====
ignota (2) (Fonteia?) married c. 138	Ap. Claudius Pulcher cos. 143, cens. 136 (c. 186–130)	(1) Antistia (Vetorum) married c. 164
Claudia; Vestal born c. 163	Claudia minor Gracchi born c. 161	Ap. Pulcher (c. 159–135/1)	Claudia; Tertia born c. 157	Q. Philippus mint IIIvir c. 129 born 160s, married c. 143
C. Pulcher (c. 136–92) cos. 92	Ap. Pulcher (c. 130–76) cos. 79	Ignota	x	L. Philippus (c. 141–c. 74) cos. 91	Q. Philippus (c. 143–c. 105)
Claudiae maior et minor (born 100–99)	Claudia Tertia; Q. Regis (born c. 98)	Ap. Pulcher (97–49) cos. 54, augur, cens. 50	C. Pulcher (96–c. 30s) pr. 56	Claudia Quarta; Q. Metelli Celeris (born c. 94)	P. Clodius Pulcher tr. pl. 58 (93–53)	Claudia Quinta; L. Luculli (born 92/90)
Claudia maior M. Bruti	Claudia minor ignoti	Claudia; C. Caesaris (born c. 56)

== Bibliography ==
=== Modern sources ===
- Alexander, Michael Charles (1990). Trials in the late Roman republic, 149 BC to 50 BC. Toronto: University of Toronto Press. ISBN 0-8020-5787-X. OCLC 41156621.
- Berry, Dominic (2008) [First published 2000]. "Pro Milone, introduction". Cicero: defence speeches. Oxford World Classics (Reissued with corrections ed.). Oxford University Press. pp. 162–82. ISBN 978-0-19-953790-7.
- Broughton, Thomas Robert Shannon (1952). The magistrates of the Roman republic. Vol. 2. New York: American Philological Association.
- Chilver, Guy Edward Farquhar; Lintott, Andrew (2012). "Clodius Pulcher, Publius". Oxford Classical Dictionary (4th ed.). Oxford University Press. doi:10.1093/acrefore/9780199381135.013.1686.
- Crawford, Michael Hewson (1974). Roman republican coinage. Vol. 1. Cambridge University Press. ISBN 0-521-07492-4.
- Crook, John; et al., eds. (1994). The last age of the Roman Republic, 146–43 BC. Cambridge Ancient History. Vol. 9 (2nd ed.). Cambridge University Press. ISBN 0-521-85073-8. OCLC 121060.
  - Wiseman, T P (1994a). "The senate and the populares, 69–60 BC". In CAH^{2} 9 (1994), pp. 327–67.
  - Wiseman, T P (1994b). "Caesar, Pompey, and Rome, 59–50 BC". In CAH^{2} 9 (1994), pp. 368–423.
- Drogula, Fred K (2019). Cato the Younger: life and death at the end of the Roman republic. Oxford University Press. ISBN 978-0-19-086902-1.
- Gruen, Erich S (1966). "P Clodius: instrument or independent agent?". Phoenix. 20 (2): 120–130. doi:10.2307/1086053. ISSN 0031-8299. JSTOR 1086053.
- Gruen, Erich (1995). The last generation of the Roman republic. Berkeley: University of California Press. ISBN 0-520-02238-6.
- Hillard, Tom (2001). Phoenix. 55 (1/2): 189–193. doi:10.2307/1089042. ISSN 0031-8299. JSTOR 1089042.
- Lintott, A W (1967). "P Clodius Pulcher – "Felix Catilina?"". Greece and Rome. 14 (2): 157–169. doi:10.1017/S0017383500017204. ISSN 0017-3835. JSTOR 642452.
- McDermott, William C (1970). "The sisters of P Clodius". Phoenix. 24 (1): 39–47. doi:10.2307/1087402. ISSN 0031-8299. JSTOR 1087402.
- Millar, Fergus (1998). The crowd in Rome in the late republic. Ann Arbor: University of Michigan Press. ISBN 978-0-472-10892-3.
- Morrell, Kit (2023). "P Clodius Pulcher and the praetorship that never was". Historia: Zeitschrift für Alte Geschichte. 72 (1): 29–57. doi:10.25162/historia-2023-0002. ISSN 0018-2311.
- Morstein-Marx, Robert (2021). Julius Caesar and the Roman people. Cambridge University Press. doi:10.1017/9781108943260. ISBN 978-1-108-83784-2. LCCN 2021024626. S2CID 242729962.
- Ramsey, John T (2016). "How and why was Pompey made sole consul in 52 BC?". Historia: Zeitschrift für Alte Geschichte. 65 (3): 298–324. doi:10.25162/historia-2016-0017. ISSN 0018-2311. JSTOR 45019234.
- Rich, John (2000). "Review of "The patrician tribune: Publius Clodius Pulcher"". Bryn Mawr Classical Review. ISSN 1055-7660.
- Riggsby, Andrew M (2002). "Clodius / Claudius". Historia: Zeitschrift für Alte Geschichte. 51 (1): 117–123. ISSN 0018-2311. JSTOR 4436643.
- Rosenstein, Nathan (2001). American Journal of Philology. 122 (4): 592–596. ISSN 0002-9475. JSTOR 1561827.
- Rundell, W M F (1979). "Cicero and Clodius: the question of credibility". Historia: Zeitschrift für Alte Geschichte. 28 (3): 301–328. ISSN 0018-2311. JSTOR 4435679.
- Tatum, W Jeffrey (1999). The patrician tribune: Publius Clodius Pulcher. Studies in the history of Greece and Rome (Paperback ed.). University of North Carolina Press. ISBN 978-0-8078-7206-2. LCCN 98-37096.
- Verboven, Koenraad (22 December 2015). "associations, Roman". Oxford Research Encyclopedia of Classics. doi:10.1093/acrefore/9780199381135.013.1695. ISBN 978-0-19-938113-5.
- Zmeskal, Klaus (2009). Adfinitas (in German). Vol. 1. Passau: Verlag Karl Stutz. ISBN 978-3-88849-304-1.

=== Ancient sources ===
- Asconius (1907). Clark, Albert Curtis (ed.). Orationum Ciceronis quinque enarratio (in Latin). Oxford: Clarendon Press – via HathiTrust.
- Cicero. Epistulae ad Atticum [Letters to Atticus].
- Cicero. Epistulae ad Quintum fratrem [Letters to brother Quintus].
- Cicero. Pro Milone [For Milo].
