= Appius Claudius Pulcher (consul 54 BC) =

Roman politician

Appius Claudius Pulcher (97–49 BC) was a Roman patrician, politician and general in the first century BC. He was consul of the Roman Republic in 54 BC. He was an expert in Roman law and antiquities, especially the esoteric lore of the augural college of which he was a controversial member. He was head of the senior line of the most powerful family of the patrician Claudii. The Claudii were one of the five leading families (gentes maiores or "Greater Clans") which had dominated Roman social and political life from the earliest years of the republic. He is best known as the recipient of 13 of the extant letters in Cicero's ad Familiares corpus (the whole of book III), which date from 53 to 50 BC. They do not include any of Appius' replies to Cicero. He is also well known for being the older brother of the infamous Clodius and Clodia.

== Lineage ==
Appius was the eldest son and chief heir of Appius Claudius Pulcher (consul 79 BC), whom he succeeded as head of the main line of Claudii Pulchri when the elder Appius died campaigning in the Rhodope Mountains as governor of Macedonia in 76 BC.

== Early career, 76–67 BC ==
His father's death left Appius head of his powerful family aged 20 or 21, but encumbered with two younger brothers, two unmarried sisters and little money. This was only relative poverty, but it proves the integrity of his father, who obviously did not profit much, if at all, from the proscription period when less scrupulous characters, most notoriously Marcus Licinius Crassus and Gaius Curio pater, made enormous fortunes from the confiscated properties of Sulla's Marian victims.

Appius found generous help from Lucius Licinius Lucullus, who upon returning from his African propraetorship in 75 BC agreed to marry the youngest sister without a dowry. He also handed over a significant legacy to Appius, who in later life marked his household's return to opulent circumstances from this gift.

Appius quickly returned the favour in political life. A promising young orator, the same year he agreed to defend A. Terentius Varro (praetor 77), recently returned from his Asian command. Varro was a close friend and relative of Lucullus and of the chief advocate of his defence Quintus Hortensius, Rome's leading orator at the time. But Varro was apparently so guilty that Hortensius resorted to dirty tricks which involved marking the ballots of the judges he had bribed, which caused a public scandal.

Appius' good relations with Varro's family endured. Varro's homonymous son (born c. 80 BC) was later one of his closest friends, serving as quaestor in the year of Appius' death, and later one of the most contentious and interesting characters of the early Augustan regime in modern scholarship: A. Terentius Varro Murena, who died in the early weeks (or days) of his consulate in 23 BC.

He served on the staff of his brother-in-law Lucullus, commander-in-chief of the Roman armies in Asia during the first half of the Third Mithridatic War. Most likely Appius went with Lucullus from the beginning in early 73 BC, although he is not directly attested in the east until the autumn of 71 following the occupation of eastern Kappadokia Pontike (Pontus), when Lucullus sent him to the Armenian king Tigranes to demand the surrender of Mithridates VI.

His manner and speech offended Tigranes, the self-styled King of Kings, who for more than twenty years had been accustomed to grovelling oriental court ceremony. This was not just every day Roman frankness, but Claudian arrogance and appietas. The failure of this mission precipitated Rome's first war with Armenia, which Lucullus began in 69 BC.

Lucullus perhaps sent young Appius with deliberate purpose, knowing full well that his manner was likely to be ill-received at the court of the King of Kings. He might have sent L. Fannius or L. Magius, both of whom had experience at the Pontic court, and his letter to Tigranes addressing him simply as King, rather than King of Kings, was almost certainly a deliberate insult of the more refined diplomatic sort. Tigranes certainly regarded it as such.

== Propraetor of Sardinia, 56–55 BC ==
After his praetorship in 57 BC Appius was allotted Sardinia as his propraetorial province. Appius' propraetorship in Sardinia was uneventful, and he was succeeded there in 55 by Marcus Aemilius Scaurus.

On the other hand, he was politically engaged before and after, attending the packed conferences at Ravenna and Lucca in spring 56 when Julius Caesar patched up the tattered coalition with Crassus and Pompey, and in about summer 55 marrying his younger daughter to Pompeius' homonymous eldest son Gnaeus Pompeius (born c.79 BC), thus ensuring his election to the consulate for the following year.

== Consul, 54 BC ==
He was elected second to the consulate for 54 along with Lucius Domitius Ahenobarbus.

== Proconsul of Cilicia, 53–51 BC ==
He was proconsul of Cilicia for a biennium after his consulate, a disaster for the region, not least because his younger brother Caius (praetor 56 BC) held the Asia province propraetorship for the three years 55–52, or possibly the quadriennium 55–51, so that Appius and his brother controlled most of Anatolia together for at least one year of overlap and perhaps two.

His predecessor Publius Cornelius Lentulus Spinther was a good and honest administrator, and his successor Cicero one of the best in Roman history. But the intervening Claudian command was disorderly, harsh and corrupt. His correspondence with Cicero as the latter approached to succeed him exhibits many signs of the severe disruption, perhaps approaching horror at times, through which the country had passed under Appius' command.

In 52 BC, during Appius’ proconsulship in Asia, his younger brother Publius (Clodius) was murdered by a political rival (Milo). In a cruel twist of irony the murder took place on the Appian Way (built by their ancestor Appius Claudius Caecus).

On his way home Appius stopped at Athens once more, renewing his interest in the Eleusinian Mysteries and began preparations for restoring the gate of the Lesser Propylaea in Eleusis, a project later completed, according to the instructions in his testament, by his chief heirs Pulcher Claudius and Rex Marcius.

== Censor, 50 BC ==
Elected censor in 50 with Caesar's father-in-law Lucius Calpurnius Piso Caesoninus (cos.58), Appius was promptly prosecuted for electoral bribery by Cicero's new son-in-law Publius Cornelius Dolabella, but he was acquitted thanks to the advocacy of his own son-in-law Brutus and Quintus Hortensius. This was the latter's final speech, since he died a few days later.

After his selection by the Senate (lectio senatus) as censor, Appius removed a senator of tribunician rank named C. Sallustius Crispus (the historian Sallust).

== The hollows of Euboea ==
He went east with Pompey early in 49, conspicuously without the excuse of command rights or even a legatio because he was still in office as censor (a magistracy of 18 months). Pompeius eventually put him in charge of Greece, where he died the same year, around the time Caesar was returning to Rome from Spain.

According to Paulus Orosius, Histories against Pagans VI (15.11):

Appius Claudius censorinus, who by Pompeius' order was looking after Greece, wanted to test the trustworthiness of the Pythian Oracle, done away with by this time. Indeed the Seer whom he forced to descend into the cave is reported to have given him this reply when consulted about the war:
This war does not concern you, O Roman.
You shall hold the hollows of Euboia.

Now they call the Euboic Gulf “the hollows”. Thus Appius, uncertain about this inscrutable fate, passed away.

There is a much longer account of Appius' revival of the long silent oracle in Lucan's Pharsalia. There we learn that Appius, as so many before him, misunderstood the prophecy and hurried off to Euboea, expecting to seize control of Chalcis as a private domain. Instead he died there and a noted tomb was built for him near the shore of the straits of Euripus.

== Augur, scholar, author, orator ==
The date of his co-option into the augural college is not known, but more likely early in life than later owing to his acknowledged expertise in augural lore, upon which he published. Most likely he succeeded his father (if the latter was one of Sulla's new augurs created in 81 BC).

As an augur he engaged in heated debate with his senior colleague Gaius Claudius Marcellus (praetor 80 BC), who maintained that augury was established from a belief in divination but perpetuated through political expediency, while Appius strongly advocated an extreme traditionalist view upholding the authenticity of the craft and eventually published a noted Liber auguralis which included a good deal of polemic directed against "Marcelline" modernity.

His typically Claudian arrogance, so evident from Cicero's correspondence with him and with Marcus Caelius Rufus, is also mentioned in a letter to Cicero from Publius Vatinius (consul 47 BC), who was Caesar's nominee to take Appius' place in the augural college after the latter's death:

Upon my word, I could not face it out, not if I had the impudence of Appius, in whose place I was elected. (translation by D.R. Shackleton Bailey)

It was also characteristic of him that he was fascinated by Athenian antiquities, but not what attracted many prominent Romans to Athens at the time: its fame as the greatest university city in the Greek-inhabited world (the oikoumene) where all the chief philosophical schools were based. He was busy in Greece in 62–61 BC when his wild youngest brother Publius Clodius Pulcher got himself into trouble for violating the rites of the Bona Dea and was prosecuted for incestus, but it is not known in what capacity.

Cicero wrote to Marcus Brutus as follows in his treatise on the history of Roman rhetoric and orators (Brutus 267):

Also of those who fell in that same war there are M. Bibulus, who wrote with accuracy as well, particularly since he was no orator, and resolutely conducted many suits; Appius Claudius your father-in-law, my colleague and friend. By then he was studious enough and both very learned and experienced as orator, as well as a true expert in augural and all public law, and in our antiquities.

== Marriages and children ==
It has been proposed by Groebe and Münzer that his wife may have been a Servilia.

No sons survived to adulthood, but he had at least two daughters Claudiae neither of whom are mentioned directly by name, but only in the context of their relationships by marriage: the younger to Pompey the younger (born c.79 BC), while the elder was the first wife of Marcus Junius Brutus (born 85). The terminus ante quem for both marriages is spring 51 BC (calendar Iunius). Most likely Claudia maior married Brutus c.59 (when he turned 26) while her minor sister's match with Magnus' son was probably arranged around the time of the Luca and Ravenna conferences (spring 56 BC), with the marriage taking place in Pompeius' second consulate after Appius returned from Sardinia. It was an interesting choice of in-laws (adfines) since Brutus refused to speak to Pompeius Magnus until the Civil War, detesting him as a tyrant and the murderer of his father. As he had no living sons, Pulcher adopted his nephew Gaius Claudius Pulcher, who changed his name to Appius Claudius Pulcher, (possibly the man who became consul in 38 BC).

Stemma

ignota (2) (Fonteia?) married c. 138	Ap. Claudius Pulcher cos. 143, cens. 136 (c. 186–130)	(1) Antistia (Vetorum) married c. 164
Claudia; Vestal born c. 163	Claudia minor Gracchi born c. 161	Ap. Pulcher (c. 159–135/1)	Claudia; Tertia born c. 157	Q. Philippus mint IIIvir c. 129 born 160s, married c. 143
C. Pulcher (c. 136–92) cos. 92	Ap. Pulcher (c. 130–76) cos. 79	Ignota	x	L. Philippus (c. 141–c. 74) cos. 91	Q. Philippus (c. 143–c. 105)
Claudiae maior et minor (born 100–99)	Claudia Tertia; Q. Regis (born c. 98)	Ap. Pulcher (97–49) cos. 54, augur, cens. 50	C. Pulcher (96–c. 30s) pr. 56	Claudia Quarta; Q. Metelli Celeris (born c. 94)	P. Clodius Pulcher tr. pl. 58 (93–53)	Claudia Quinta; L. Luculli (born 92/90)
Claudia maior M. Bruti	Claudia minor ignoti	Claudia; C. Caesaris (born c. 56)

Political offices
Preceded by Pompey; Marcus Licinius Crassus	Roman consul 54 BC with Lucius Domitius Ahenobarbus	Succeeded by Gnaeus Domitius Calvinus; Marcus Valerius Messalla Rufus
Preceded by Marcus Valerius Messalla Niger; Publius Servilius Vatia Isauricus	Roman censor 50 BC with Lucius Calpurnius Piso Caesoninus	Succeeded by Gaius Antonius Hybrida; Publius Sulpicius Rufus
