= Sextus Atilius Serranus Gavianus =

Plebeian tribune in 57 BC

Sextus Atilius Serranus Gavianus was plebeian tribune in 57 BC. He previously served as quaestor in 63 BC. During his year as tribune he supported Publius Clodius Pulcher in the senate by vetoing the motion then passing to recall Cicero from exile. However, after seeing the unanimity of the senators arrayed against him, he withdrew his veto. He also played a part in forestalling Titus Annius Milo's prosecution of Clodius for public violence in 58 BC by, with then-consul Metellus Nepos and then-praetor Appius Claudius Pulcher, packing the calendar such that no prosecution could be scheduled.
