= Gaius Porcius Cato =

Gaius Porcius Cato may refer to:

- Gaius Porcius Cato (consul 114 BC), grandson of Cato the Elder
- Gaius Porcius Cato (tribune 56 BC), supporter of Clodius and opponent of Cato the Younger
