= Lucius Ninnius Quadratus =

Plebeian tribune in 58 BC and opponent of Clodius

Lucius Ninnius Quadratus (fl. 58–49 BC) was plebeian tribune in 58 BC. During his year as tribune, he opposed the efforts of his colleague, Publius Clodius Pulcher, and supported the orator Cicero.

Ninnius' family likely hailed from Pompeii; in 49 BC he is recorded as living there and someone of a similar name is later recorded as Pompeiian aedile in AD 14. During his tribunate, Ninnius opposed Clodius' attempts to send the former consul Cicero into exile. On 1 January 58 BC he opposed the attempts of Clodius' associate Sextus Cloelius to illicitly celebrate the Compitalia. At this time he also was threatening a veto Clodius' legislative proposals. But on 3 January, at Cicero's insistence he withdrew his objections after a deal was reached between Clodius, Cicero and the senatorial elite where Clodius agreed to give up his vendetta against Cicero if he would pressure Ninnius to lift his veto.

After Clodius reneged on the deal and Cicero's banishment became likely, Ninnius again clashed with Clodius, bringing and passing a proposal in the senate to adopt mourning dress over Clodius' proposal. After Clodius broke with Pompey, attacked the consul Aulus Gabinius in the city, and dedicated Gabinius' property to the plebeian goddess Ceres, Ninnius dedicated Clodius' property to the same goddess in retaliation. Shortly afterwards, on 1 June, Ninnius moved in the senate that Cicero be recalled; although the proposal was supported almost unanimously, Clodius vetoed it.

Ninnius opposed the lex Trebonia in 55 BC and, along with Cato, supported the effort of tribune Marcus Favonius to block the law; they were, however, unsuccessful. In May 49 BC, during the opening of Caesar's civil war, he told then-proconsul Cicero, who was assigned to hold Campania against Caesar, that three cohorts at Pompeii were prepared to serve under him. The effort came to naught, however, when Cicero departed Italy on 7 June 49 BC for Pompey's camp in Greece.

== Bibliography ==
- Broughton, Thomas Robert Shannon (1952). The magistrates of the Roman republic. Vol. 2. New York: American Philological Association.
- Dyck, Andrew R (2025). Cicero: the man and his works. Cambridge University Press. doi:10.1017/9781316084342. ISBN 978-1-316-08434-2.
- Münzer, Fredrich (1936). "Ninnius 3". Realencyclopädie der classischen Altertumswissenschaft (in German). Vol. XVII, 1. Stuttgart: Butcher. cols. 632–633.
- Tatum, W Jeffrey (1999). The patrician tribune: Publius Clodius Pulcher. Studies in the history of Greece and Rome (Paperback ed.). University of North Carolina Press. ISBN 978-0-8078-7206-2. LCCN 98-37096.
