= Favonius =

Favonius can refer to:

- Favonius (wind god), one of the Anemoi; the west wind in Roman mythology
- Favonius (butterfly), a genus of butterflies
- Favonius (horse), winner of the 1871 Epsom Derby

== See also ==
- Favonia gens, a family (gens) of Ancient Rome
- Knights of Favonius (Chinese: 西风骑士团), an organization from the 2020 game Genshin Impact
