= Caecilia Metella (daughter of Celer) =

Daughter of Clodia and Metellus

- Born: around 70 B.C. Roman Republic
- Died: around 44 B.C.
- Spouse: Publius Cornelius Lentulus Spinther
- Parents: Quintus Caecilius Metellus Celer (father); Clodia Metelli (mother)
- Family: Caecilii Metelli

Caecilia Metella was daughter of Quintus Caecilius Metellus Celer and Clodia. She was an infamous woman in Rome during the late Republic and a celebrity of sorts.

== Biography ==
=== Early life ===
She was the daughter of the consul Quintus Caecilius Metellus Celer, while her mother Clodia was a notorious adulterer and possibly the inspiration for the figure of Lesbia in poetry. Caecilia seems to have taken after her mother.

=== Marriage and scandals ===
In 53 BC, Metella Celer was married to Publius Cornelius Lentulus Spinther, a conservative politician, allied to her father's family. Like her mother, Metella did not content herself with a simple married life. Briefly after the wedding she started an affair with Publius Cornelius Dolabella, a man of the opposite political spectrum. Spinther divorced her in 45 BC in the midst of a huge scandal. (Note: In the past it was believed by some that she was the wife of Publius Cornelius Lentulus Spinther the Younger, the son of her husband, but this is not generally supported today.) Cicero bitterly discusses the affair in his letters, because at the time, his daughter Tullia was Dolabella's wife.

Metella went back to her family in absolute disgrace. She was still in her twenties and very beautiful. Her cousins did not hesitate in using her for political conspiracies. Metella seduced several of Julius Caesar's intimate friends, in order to get the family name cleared after the defeat of the Optimates in the battles of Pharsalus and Munda. Amongst her non-political lovers is the poet Ticida, who wrote about Metella, giving her the name of "Perilla". Her last known lover was one Aesopo, a wealthy member of the equites, who supported the Caecilii Metelli for a few years. Her date of death is unknown.

== See also ==
- List of Roman women
- Women in ancient Rome
- Caecilii Metelli family tree
