= Favonia gens =

The gens Favonia was a plebeian family of Ancient Rome. It is known chiefly from three individuals, one of whom, Marcus Favonius (c. 90 BC – 42 BC) was a politician during the period of the fall of the Roman Republic.

== Members ==
- Marcus Favonius (c. 90 BC – 42 BC) was a Roman politician during the period of the fall of the Roman Republic. He is noted for his imitation of Cato the Younger, his espousal of the Cynic philosophy, and for his appearance as the Poet in William Shakespeare's play Julius Caesar.
- Favonius Eulogius, a Carthaginian rhetor who was contemporary with Augustine of Hippo and wrote Disputatio de somnio Scipionis.
- Marcus Favonius Facilis, a centurion of Legion XX who died in Britain (probably at Camulodunum) and whose tombstone is displayed in Colchester museum.

== Name ==
- Favonius, meaning "favorable", was one of the Roman wind gods, who held dominion over plants and flowers and was generally equated with the Greek god Zephyrus (his 'return' in early February signaled the coming of Spring in Rome).

== See also ==
- List of Roman gentes
