= Marcus Valerius Messalla Rufus =

Ancient Roman politician, consul in 53 BCE

Marcus Valerius Messalla Rufus (c. 104/3 – 26 BC), was a Roman senator who was elected consul for 53 BC.

== Family ==
Messalla was the son of Marcus Valerius Messalla Niger and Hortensia (sister of the consul of 69 BC). He had a sister, Valeria Messala, who was the fifth wife of the dictator Lucius Cornelius Sulla.

Messalla had two sons: Marcus Valerius Messalla (consul 32 BC) and Potitus Valerius Messalla (suffect consul 29 BC).

== Career ==
Messalla Rufus probably served as Praetor in 62 BC. His appointment as consul in 53 BC was delayed due to a scandal involving the consular elections, followed by public disorder between the followers of Publius Clodius Pulcher and Titus Annius Milo. It was only in July 53 BC that he entered the office. He and his colleague's attempts to hold elections for 52 BC were also disrupted.

Messalla Rufus was also elected augur at an early date, for he was a member of the collegia of augurs for 55 years.

Messalla Rufus was accused more than once of illegal practices in connection with the elections; on the first occasion he was acquitted, in spite of his obvious guilt, through the eloquence of his uncle Quintus Hortensius; on the second he was condemned. He took the side of Gaius Julius Caesar in the civil war. He was a legate under Caesar probably by 48 BC. In 47 BC, Messalla Rufus had to deal with mutinous troops under his command at Messana.

== See also ==
- Valeria gens

== Footnotes ==
Political offices
| Preceded by L. Domitius Ahenobarbus; Ap. Claudius Pulcher | Consul of the Roman Republic; 53 BC; With: Gnaeus Domitius Calvinus | Succeeded by Pompey; Metellus Scipio |
