= Appius Claudius Pulcher (consul 79 BC) =

Roman noble, general and politician

Appius Claudius Pulcher (c. 129 BC – 76 BC) was a Roman noble, general and politician of the 1st century BC. He was the father of a number of renowned Romans, most notable: the infamous Clodius and Clodia.

== Biography ==
There is uncertainty about who his father was. It was most probably the Appius Claudius Pulcher who was consul in 143 BC. He was a supporter of Lucius Cornelius Sulla and served as praetor in 88 BC. He was exiled in that year by Gaius Marius while Sulla was away in the east. He returned to Rome after Lucius Cornelius Cinna died in 84 BC, and served as consul in 79 BC and as governor of Roman Macedonia from 78 BC to 76 BC.

== Family ==
Appius Claudius Pulcher was likely married to a Caecilia Metella (a daughter of Balearicus), although this is not universally agreed upon, T. P. Wiseman believes that his wife was a Servilia Caepione (it is known that there was a Servilia around this time that was the wife of a Pulcher, but it is not known who either of them were). Jeffrey Tatum thinks that there is too little information to be sure either way.

He had six known children:

- Appius Claudius Pulcher (consul of 54 BC)
- Gaius Claudius Pulcher
- Publius Claudius Pulcher, who changed his name to Clodius
- Claudia Tertia, who married Quintus Marcius Rex
- Claudia (also known as Clodia), the wife of Quintus Caecilius Metellus Celer
- Claudia (c. 90 BC – after 66 BC), first wife of Lucius Licinius Lucullus, whom she divorced in 66 BC

T. P. Wiseman also speculated that Clodia the wife of Aulus Ofilius may have been one of his daughters.

== See also ==
- List of Roman consuls

== Sources ==
- Christian Settipani. Continuité gentilice et continuité sénatoriale dans les familles sénatoriales romaines à l'époque impériale, 2000, p 62.

Political offices
Preceded by Lucius Cornelius Sulla and Quintus Caecilius Metellus Pius	Consul of the Roman Republic with Publius Servilius Vatia; 79 BC	Succeeded by Marcus Aemilius Lepidus and Quintus Lutatius Catulus
