= Publius Cornelius Lentulus Spinther =

Consul of the Roman republic in 57 BC

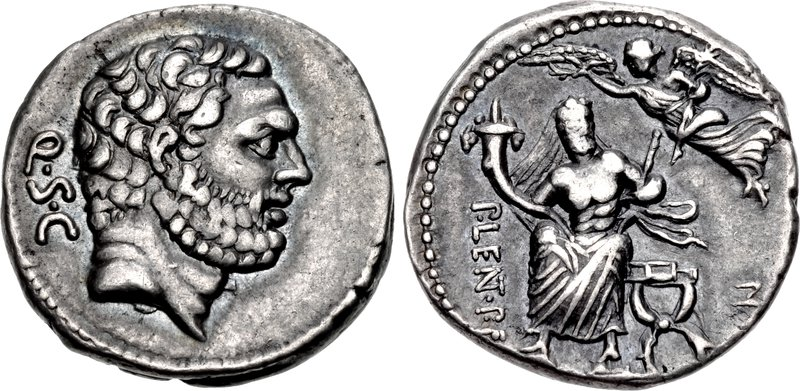
Denarius minted by Spinther in 74 BC. The obverse portrays Hercules, while the reverse depicts Genius Populi Romani crowned by Victory. The Q on the obverse stands for quaestor.

Publius Cornelius Lentulus Spinther (c. 100 BC – 47 BC) was a Roman politician and general. Hailing from the patrician family of the Cornelii, he helped suppress the Catilinarian conspiracy during his term as curule aedile in 63 BC and later served as consul in 57 BC. Denied the opportunity to invade Egypt the following year, he nevertheless won some victories in his province of Cilicia and celebrated a triumph over it in 51 BC.

In the run-up to Caesar's civil war, he sided with Pompey and the senate. Captured by Caesar and pardoned at Corfinium in the opening months of the war, he made his way to Greece to join Pompey's forces. He is last attested to in early 47 BC.

== Early career ==
Spinther belonged to the famous patrician gens Cornelia. He was the son of a homonymous father and received the cognomen "Spinther" supposedly from his resemblance to an actor by that name. Lucius Cornelius Lentulus Crus, who served as one of the consuls in the year 49 BC, was his younger brother.

He entered public life in 74 BC, when he served as quaestor urbanus. During his office, he minted denarii bearing a picture of Genius Populi Romani, to show the justice of the war waged against Sertorius in Spain. Although the Genius is also found on coins minted by other Cornelii Lentuli, numismatist Michael Crawford doubts that he was particularly worshipped in the family.

Afterwards, in the year 63 BC – the same year as that of Cicero's consulship and of the Catilinarian conspiracy – he served as curule aedile. During his term, he assisted Cicero in the suppression of the conspiracy – he held in custody a conspirator and praetor of that year, Publius Cornelius Lentulus Sura, before the conspirator's execution – and also provided splendid games "outd[oing] all his predecessors" wherein he outfitted stage equipment with silver.

He was then served as urban praetor for the year 60. He was elected, also in that year, as one of the pontifices, as one of a number of replacement for members of the college who had died. After his praetorship he was assigned as governor of Hispania Citerior, probably with proconsular status, and served there for the year 59. During his governorship, he struck coins bearing his nickname, proving "Spinther" was now being officially used to distinguish him from homonymous Cornelii.

== Consul and governor ==
In the campaign in 58 BC for the next year's consulship, Spinther received the backing of Julius Caesar and Pompey. Caesar had for some time cultivated Spinther's friendship by supporting Spinther's campaign for the pontificate and his assignment to Hispania Citerior. Elected first, he was then joined in the consulship by Quintus Caecilius Metellus Nepos, a Pompeian enemy.

At the beginning of the consular year, 1 January 57 BC, Spinther moved successfully in the senate – after some convincing of his colleague Nepos who had previously been opposed to the matter – to have Cicero recalled from exile; he then carried a bill through the comitia centuriata to that effect and helped Cicero recover his house, which had been dispossessed during his exile. In the autumn, news came to Rome of an Egyptian dynastic struggle, which promised huge financial rewards and prestige for any prospective commander. Spinther, with his colleague Nepos, were successful in having Pompey – known to be interested in the command – relegated to a corn commission. His actions during the year, and thereafter, showed "no strong allegiance to Caesar" nor did Pompey's support "forestall unpleasant friction over the restoration of [Ptolemy]".

Taking as proconsul the governorship of Cilicia – to which the island of Cyprus also had been added – he secured for himself instructions from the senate to intervene in the Egyptian dynastic struggle and restore Ptolemy XII Auletes to the throne, but stopped after a Sibylline oracle prohibited the use of an army. Cicero, in a debate in the senate on 13 January 56 BC, supported Spinther's interests and described the debate in a letter:

- The senate voted overwhelmingly against use of military force.
- Publius Servilius Isauricus proposed not restoring Ptolemy XII.
- Bibulus proposed sending three senators without imperium to mediate (thereby excluding Pompey).
- Crassus proposed sending three senators with imperium to mediate.
- Quintus Hortensius, Cicero, and Marcus Lucullus proposed sending Spinther.
- Lucius Volcacius Tullus, supported by Lucius Afranius and Pompey's allies, proposed sending Pompey.

Eventually, Bibulus' proposal was defeated; Hortensius' proposal was vetoed by a tribune. After a delay, one tribune – Gaius Porcius Cato – proposed recalling Spinther (already in Cilicia). Another tribune – Lucius Caninius Gallus – proposed sending Pompey. Publius Clodius Pulcher's supporters then proposed sending Marcus Licinius Crassus. After the consul Gnaeus Cornelius Lentulus Marcellinus put all tribunician proposals on hold by declaring public holidays; Gaius Cato threatened to veto the elections. Eventually, Isauricus' proposal received senatorial approval, but was then vetoed.

In the end, the duelling machinations of Pompey, Crassus, and opponents all countered each other and led to inaction. The actions of the consuls and the contrasting ambitions of Pompey and Crassus, two of the three men in the so-called First Triumvirate, showed their alliance "in a shambles".

Spinther governed Cilicia from 56 to 54 BC. During his term, he was acclaimed imperator. He also struck large silver coins (known as Cistophoric tetradrachms) from a provincial mint at Apameia in Phrygia that bear his name - P LENTVLVS P F IMPERATOR. He returned to Italy in 53 BC but stayed outside the pomerium hoping for a triumph. He did so for two years before celebrating it in late 51 BC.

== The civil war ==
In the run-up to Caesar's civil war, according to Cassius Dio, Spinther played a role in the rejection of an extension of Caesar's term by voting down the insertion of an intercalary month by Gaius Scribonius Curio in 50 BC. In the vote, he allegedly was joined by Lucius Domitius Ahenobarbus and a young Marcus Junius Brutus.

When the war started in 49 BC, Spinther took an anti-Caesarian position quickly and sided with Pompey. He joined Domitius Ahenobarbus' attempt to engage Caesar at Corfinium with three legions in the early months of the war but was besieged and the two consulars – along with Domitius' son, one of the quaestors, an ex-praetor, and a Pompeian prefect – were forced to surrender. Caesar granted them their lives and even returned to Domitius, who was in overall command, some six million sesterces; Caesar took, however, all the men and sent them thence to take Sicily.

After some hesitation, he rejoined Pompey and his army in Greece. On his return, Cicero wrote a letter to Caesar thanking him for his generous treatment of Spinther; it seems, privately, Spinther believed Caesar's clemency was merely a cold and temporary stratagem which would disappear if Caesar lost the support of the people.

In 48 BC, Pompey's main army confronted that of Julius Caesar and his lieutenant Marc Antony at the Battle of Pharsalus. Spinther fought in the battle; it ended in decisive defeat for the Pompeian forces. Pompey himself fled to Egypt (where he was then assassinated by Egypt's ruler Ptolemy XIII in the mistaken belief this act would please Caesar) and Spinther escaped to Rhodes, where he was at first refused admission, but subsequently given asylum.

== Death and family ==
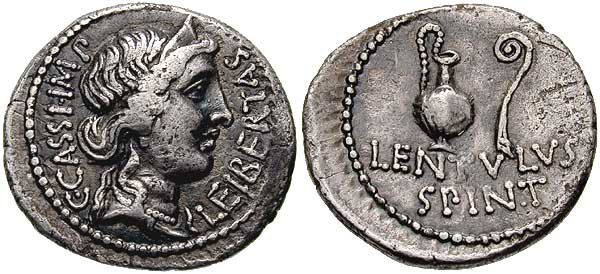
Denarius minted in 43 or 42 BC by Cassius Longinus and Spinther's son Lucius, depicting the crowned head of Libertas. The reverse features a jug and lituus, alluding to Lucius Spinther's augurate.

Although Sextus Aurelius Victor implies Spinther was killed in 48 BC, Cicero's dialogue Brutus implies that Spinther survived until early 47 with a terminus ante quem of 46 BC. Aurelius Victor's narrative blames Caesar for Spinther's death; the event is unverified by other contemporary sources, but may explain why his homonymous son joined Caesar's assassins, Brutus and Cassius, and struck coins for them during their civil war against Mark Antony and Octavian. The younger Spinther, like his father, also put his own name and nickname "Spinther" on the reverse of his coins, the obverse of which feature the head of 'Liberty'.

Spinther's wife had an affair with Publius Cornelius Dolabella which lead to their divorce. His wife involved in this scandal was likely Caecilia Metella.

There may also have been some kind of marriage alliance between Spinther and Lucius Aurelius Cotta.

== See also ==
- List of Roman consuls

Political offices
Preceded by Lucius Calpurnius Piso Caesoninus and Aulus Gabinius	Consul of the Roman Republic with Quintus Caecilius Metellus Nepos; 57 BC	Succeeded by Gnaeus Cornelius Lentulus Marcellinus and Lucius Marcius Philippus
