= Gaius Porcius Cato (tribune 56 BC) =

Gaius Porcius Cato (1st century BC) was a distant relative, probably a second cousin, of the more famous Marcus Porcius Cato, called Cato the Younger. This Cato was probably the son of Gaius Porcius Cato, the homonymous consul of 114 BC, being then the grandson of Marcus Porcius Cato Licinianus and thereby the great-grandson of the famous Cato the Censor, often called Cato the Elder.

Gaius Porcius Cato was a client (an adherent) of triumvir Marcus Licinius Crassus and was an ally of Clodius (Publius Clodius Pulcher) the infamous Patrician tribune of the plebs, in his street gang war against Milo (Titus Annius Milo). He attacked Publius Cornelius Lentulus Spinther and Gnaeus Pompeius Magnus (Pompey the Great) in 59 BC by prosecuting a follower, Gabinius, for ambitus (political corruption) but was thwarted by a Pompeian praetor and was chased from the rostra by an angry crowd. In 57 BC he spoke against delaying the aedelician elections (Clodius was standing and Milo wanted the delay to allow a prosecution).

== Tribunate ==
Cato served as a plebeian tribune himself in 56 BC, and in his political activities, he was usually associated with his colleague Nonius Sufenas. During their tribunate, they worked for the so-called First triumvirate of Gaius Julius Caesar, Crassus and Pompey, now allied with his benefactor Crassus, and delayed the comitia to promote the election of Pompey and Crassus as consuls. The following year, after his tribunate, Cato and Sufenas were both accused of procedural violations. Although Cato's prosecutor in the trial was the future Caesarian historian Gaius Asinius Pollio, they were both acquitted. Cato may have won a praetorship in 55 BC, but T. Corey Brennan disputes this.
