= Lucius Calpurnius Piso Caesoninus (consul 58 BC) =

Roman politician

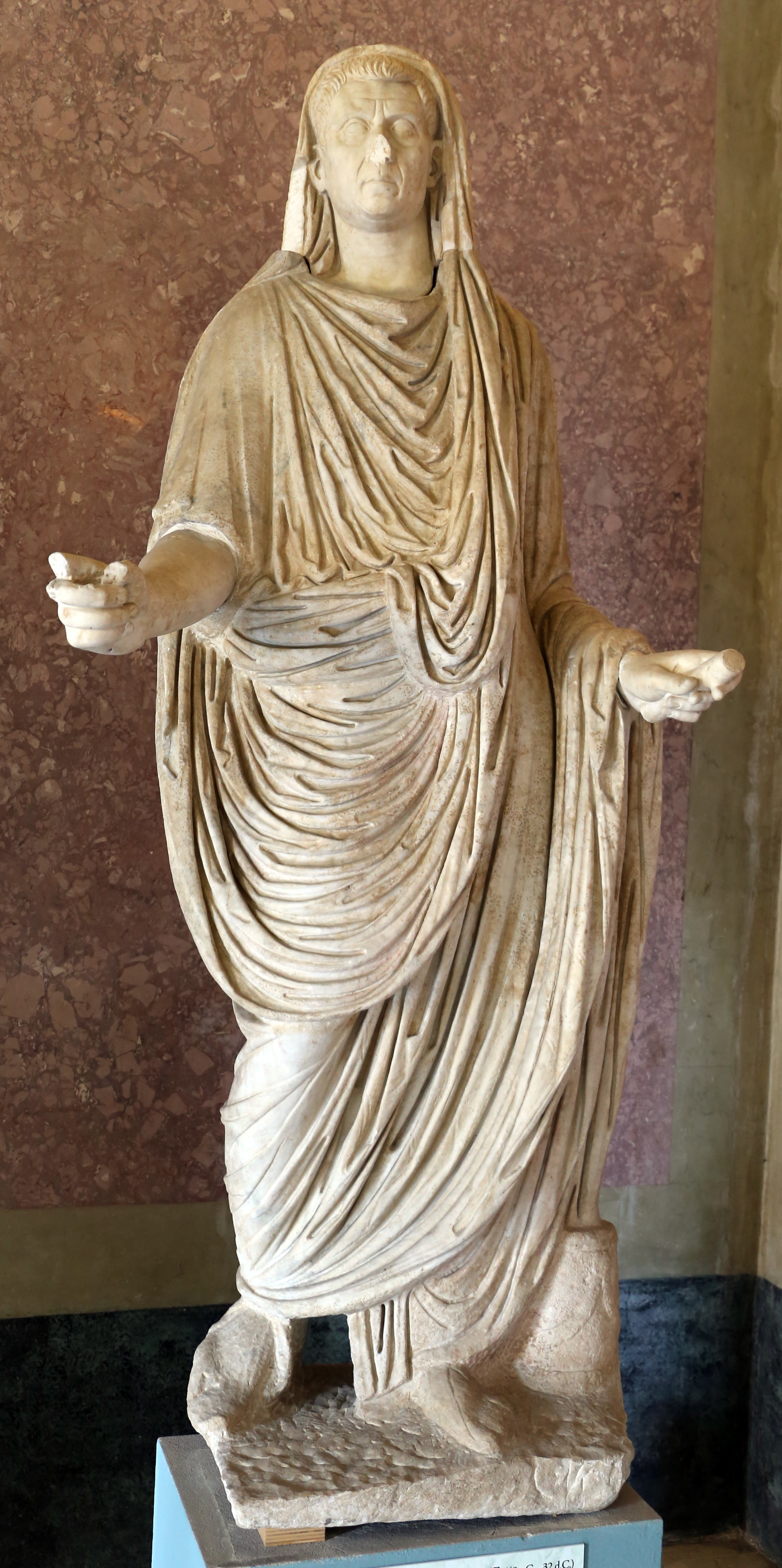
- Statue of Piso at the Museo archeologico nazionale di Parma
- Born: 101 BC
- Died: c. 43 BC (aged c. 58)
- Occupations: Politician and philosopher
- Office: Consul (58 BC)
- Children: Lucius Calpurnius Piso Caesoninus; Calpurnia
- Relatives: Lucius Calpurnius Piso Caesoninus (grandfather)

Lucius Calpurnius Piso Caesoninus (101 BC – c. 43 BC) was a Roman senator and the father-in-law of Julius Caesar through his daughter Calpurnia. He was reportedly a follower of a school of Epicureanism that had been modified to befit politicians, as Epicureanism itself favoured withdrawal from politics. Piso was consul in the year 58 BC with Aulus Gabinius as his colleague.

== Biography ==
Caesar mentions his father-in-law in his Commentarii de Bello Gallico. Piso's grandfather, also named Lucius Calpurnius Piso Caesoninus, was killed with Lucius Cassius Longinus in 107 BC by the same Tigurini that Caesar conquered the year of Piso's consulship. As Caesar's father-in-law, when Cicero was faced with exile later that year for having violated the Leges Clodiae by executing members of the Catiline conspiracy without a formal trial, Piso declined to protect Cicero from the threat and consequences of exile, earning the enmity of that orator. In response, Cicero attacked Piso both during and after his subsequent administration of the province of Macedonia, which he administered from 57 BC to the beginning of 55 BC, when he was recalled and replaced by Quintus Ancharius. Piso's recall was perhaps in consequence of the violent attack made upon him by Cicero in the Roman Senate in his speech De provinciis consularibus.

On his return, Piso addressed the Senate in his defence; Cicero replied with coarse and exaggerated invective, a writing and/or oratory style or genre in classical times, in a speech known as In Pisonem. Piso issued a pamphlet by way of rejoinder, and there the matter ended. Cicero may have been afraid to bring the father-in-law of Julius Caesar to trial. At any rate, Piso's repute was solid enough that he was elected, though reluctant, to the office of censor in 50 BC.

At the outbreak of the civil war between Caesar and Pompey, Piso offered his services as mediator. However, when Caesar marched upon Rome, Piso left the city by way of protest of Caesar. After the murder of Caesar, Piso insisted on the provisions of Caesar's will being strictly carried out, and the assassinated Dictator was given a public funeral. In the growing tension between Mark Antony and Octavianus, Piso played a role neutral to both parties, yet seeking some form of resolution between the two sides. At the Senate session held that 1 August he offered a proposal to bring harmony between the two, but not one man supported him.

As armed strife between the soldiers of the two sides increased, Piso continued to work for peace. When the Senate opened the year 43 BC with debating over Cicero's motion to declare Antony an enemy of the state, Piso twice intervened over the legality of such an act, arguing for compromise. Still hoping for peace, Piso joined two consular Senators -- Lucius Marcius Philippus and Servius Sulpicius Rufus—in an embassy to Antony at his camp in Mutina later that month. Piso and Philippus returned the following month—Sulpicius had died on the journey—to present terms from Antony that enraged Cicero. Antony's terms were rejected and the Senate declared a state of war. However, events in the further East alarmed the party at Rome, and a second embassy was sent to Antony in March, which included Piso. He is not heard of after this, and Syme concludes from this silence he died not long after.

== Patronage ==
According to Ronald Syme, Piso "united loyalty to Roman standards of conduct to a lively appreciation of the literature and philosophy of Hellas." The author Philodemus was one of those whom he sponsored.

Piso is believed to have been the owner of the Villa of the Papyri at Herculaneum.

== Family ==
According to Asconius, Piso's wife was the daughter of one Rutilius Nudus. In addition to the daughter who married Julius Caesar, Piso also had a son, Lucius Calpurnius Piso, known as "the Pontifex", consul in 15 BC.

== Legacy ==
The maxim fiat justitia ruat caelum ("let justice be done, though the heavens fall"), used by Lord Mansfield in Somerset's Case and in reversing the outlawry of John Wilkes, and in the alternate form fiat iustitia, et pereat mundus by Ferdinand of Habsburg, is sometimes attributed to Piso Caesoninus (more often to Gnaeus Calpurnius Piso), but this is disputed.

Political offices
Preceded by Gaius Julius Caesar; Marcus Calpurnius Bibulus	Roman consul 58 BC with Aulus Gabinius	Succeeded by Publius Cornelius Lentulus Spinther; Quintus Caecilius Metellus Nepos
