= Quintus Caecilius Metellus Nepos (consul 57 BC) =

1st century BC Roman politician

- Born: c. 100 BC
- Died: 55 BC; Rome
- Occupations: Politician and soldier
- Office: Tribune of the plebs (62 BC); Consul (57 BC)
- Father: Q. Caecilius Metellus Nepos
- Relatives: Q. Caecilius Metellus Celer (brother)

Quintus Caecilius Metellus Nepos (c. 100 BC – 55 BC) was an ancient Roman politician during the Late Republic. He was a son of Quintus Caecilius Metellus Nepos and served as tribune of the plebs in 62 BC, consul in 57 BC, and the governor of Hispania Citerior from 56–55 BC.

Early in his career, Nepos served under Pompey during the war against the pirates and the Third Mithridatic War. Returning to Rome in 63 BC, he served as a Pompeian ally in the plebeian tribunate. But after Pompey broke with his family on his return to Italy in 62 BC, Nepos became one of Pompey's opponents, especially after the formation of the so-called First Triumvirate in 59 BC. Elected against the wishes of the triumvirs in 57 BC to a consulship, he supported his cousin Clodius against Pompey's ally Milo and opposed Pompey's attempts to secure another military command, but regardless supported the recall of Cicero from exile.

== Family ==
Nepos was a member of the powerful, plebeian gens Caecilia. He was the son of another Quintus Caecilius Metellus Nepos and Licinia Prima. His paternal grandfather was Quintus Caecilius Metellus Balearicus. Nepos had two siblings. An older brother Quintus Caecilius Metellus Celer, the consul of 60 BCE. Through his mother's first marriage to Pontifex Maximus Quintus Mucius Scaevola he was the half-brother of Mucia Tertia the later wife of Pompey the Great.

== Early career ==
Nepos' first recorded public activity was to bring charges in 72 BC against Gaius Scribonius Curio, who was a family rival. The trial was squashed when Curio responded with countercharges and both men backed down. Legal manoeuvres of this sort were common in the late republic and indicate growing factionalism through the 70s BC. Metellus Nepos was a lieutenant (legate) of Pompey in the campaign against the pirates in the Mediterranean for 67–66 BC. There, he commanded naval forces and men on the coast from Lycia to Phoenicia. Like his brother, Metellus Celer, he served in the Third Mithridatic War against Mithridates VI of Pontus and Tigranes the Great of Armenia, taking Damascus in Syria in 64 and leaving Pompey's army for Rome the next year to stand for the tribunate as a Pompeian ally.

Nepos was elected in 63 BC for the plebeian tribunate; he served alongside Cato the Younger that year. After his accession to office in December 63, he attacked Cicero – then-consul – for his illegal execution of the Catilinarian conspirators. He tried to indict Cicero on charges of murder, but the senate passed an amnesty for the consul and then threatened to declare any potential prosecutor a public enemy. In January 62 BC, Nepos attempted to force through a bill to recall Pompey from the war against Mithridates to assume command of the war against Catiline's remaining forces in Etruria. In doing so, he ignored the compulsory waiting period between a bill's promulgation and assembly of a vote. Nepos likely heard from his brother – Metellus Celer, then proconsul in Cisalpine Gaul, – that Catiline would imminently be defeated by Antonius Hybrida's forces in northern Italy.

On 3 January 62 BC, he attempted to pass the bill to transfer the command to Pompey over opposition of the senate. Nepos, along with his ally Julius Caesar (then serving as praetor), assembled the tribes at the Forum before the Temple of Castor and Pollux. Cato and one of his allies, another tribune named Quintus Minucius Thermus, forced their way to the front and Cato then "brusquely took a seat between Nepos and Caesar [to prevent] them from communicating privately". When Nepos directed the bill to be read, Cato vetoed it; when Nepos started to read it himself, Cato snatched the draft from his hands; when Nepos started to recite it from memory, Thermus put his hand over the Nepos' mouth to stop him from speaking. A fight accordingly broke out in the Forum. In response to the violence, the senate passed a senatus consultum ultimum against Nepos, forcing him to flee the city to Pompey's camp in the east.

Suetonius and Plutarch then assert that Nepos, Caesar, or both were removed from their offices. This is unlikely; the senate during the republic had no such powers. More contemporaneous sources imply that the senate may have moved to ratify Nepos' departure from the city (tribunes were legally forbidden from leaving the city), which Cato likely objected to. The proposal to send Pompey after the Catilinarians, regardless, became irrelevant when Catiline and his forces were decisively defeated in battle at Pistoria shortly thereafter.

== Praetorship and consulship ==
After Pompey's return to Italy near the end of 62 BC, Pompey divorced his wife Mucia. Doing so "[gave] substance to reports of her infidelity" and broke Pompey's alliance with Nepos and Metellus Celer, Mucia's half-brothers. Nepos then served as praetor in 60 BC. During his term, he passed a law which abolished customs duties in Rome and Italy. The move likely was related to reforms, pursued by the senate in the aftermath of the Catilinarian conspiracy, to buttress support among agricultural exporters and wealthy importers of luxury goods. He shortly thereafter also became an augur.

After the formation of the so-called First Triumvirate in 59 BC, Nepos continued in opposition to Pompey and his new allies. Writ large, the alliance between Pompey, Caesar, and Crassus forced a realignment in Roman politics with many factions shifting to balance against the triumvirs. In the elections for the consulship of 57 BC, Pompey and Caesar were able to get their ally Publius Cornelius Lentulus Spinther elected as consul prior, but were unable to stop Nepos' election as Spinther's colleague. However, neither consul ended up fully supporting the triumvirs.

While Spinther and Pompey supported the recall of Cicero from exile – he had been exiled the previous year by Publius Clodius Pulcher for his order to kill the Catilinarian conspiractors – Nepos supported his cousin Clodius and ran interference. Pompey and Spinther were eventually able to convince Nepos to drop his opposition and had a bill recalling Cicero ratified by the comitia centuriata. Cicero then tried to mend relations with Nepos; but Nepos did not fully abandon his cousin Clodius and opposed attempts by Titus Annius Milo (one of Clodius' enemies) to have Clodius brought up on charges while also supporting Clodius' canvass for an aedileship.

During Nepos' consulship, Pompey also sought a military command to resolve a civil war that had then broken out in Egypt. Spinther and Nepos put Pompey in charge of a corn commission to ensure he would be unable to contest Spinther's attempts to secure for himself the Egyptian command. Nepos may also have successfully opposed in this year a bill which would have given Pompey even larger authority.

After his consulship, Nepos was appointed as proconsul to Hispania Citerior. He may have served in the province previously after his praetorship. While there, he campaigned against the Vaccaei on the northern edge of his province, near the river Douro. His victories in Spain were temporary; after his term's completion in 55 BC, he returned to Rome and died shortly thereafter.

== See also ==
- Caecilia gens

== Notes ==
Political offices
Preceded by L. Calpurnius Piso Caesoninus; A. Gabinius	Consul of the Roman Republic; 57 BC; With: P. Cornelius Lentulus Spinther	Succeeded by Gn. Cornelius Lentulus Marcellinus; L. Marcius Philippus
