= Quintus Caecilius Metellus Celer =

Roman consul in 60 BC and opponent of Pompey and Caesar

Quintus Caecilius Metellus Celer (c. 104 BC – 59 BC) was a Roman politician who was consul in 60 BC and in the next year opposed Pompey, Caesar, and the First Triumvirate's political programme. He was a member of the powerful and influential plebeian noble family, the Caecilii Metelli. Prior to 62 BC, he was an ally of Pompey and had served as urban praetor in 63, augur by 63 BC, possibly aedile in 67 BC, and plebeian tribune in either 72 or 68 BC.

== Life and career ==
During the Third Mithridatic War (73-63 BC) against Mithridates VI of Pontus and Tigranes the Great of Armenia, Celer was a commander of some sort. TRS Broughton in the Magistrates of the Roman Republic suggests he possibly was a legate, military tribune, or quaestor. The nature of his command is unknown. He evidently returned to Rome by the early 60s, as he held the plebeian tribunate in either 72 or 68 BC. He may have been plebeian aedile in 67 BC but there is substantial doubt.

Following his urban magistracies, if they occurred, he served as a legate under Pompey in 66 BC. In the winter of 66 BC, Oroeses, king of the Caucasian Albanians, attacked Pompey's army during Saturnalia celebrations in Lesser Armenia. Pompey had split his army into three divisions. Celer was in charge of one of them and custodian of Tigranes the Younger of Armenia. Celer vigorously repulsed Oroeses while Flaccus and Pompey, who were in charge of the other two divisions, defeated the other Albanians.

=== Praetorship and proconsulship ===
Celer became urban praetor in 63 BC. During the year, Titus Labienus (then plebeian tribune) and Gaius Julius Caesar, indicted an old and obscure senator, Gaius Rabirius, for the killing of Lucius Appuleius Saturninus thirty-seven years earlier. The precise events of Rabirius' trials is not entirely clear. Michael Alexander's Trials of the late Roman republic has two trials: the first was a farcically archaic iudicium populi before Lucius Julius Caesar and Gaius Julius Caesar as duumviri perduellionis for the killing of Saturninius which was aborted after conviction by the defendant's appeal to the people; a second trial, before the comitia tributa, was on various other offences. At this trial, then-consul Cicero spoke in Rabirius' defence and the trial was regardless aborted: Celer interfered in the trial's operations by putting a red flag on the Janiculum which indicated a fictitious enemy raid and the adjournment of all civilian public business.

Later in the year, the Catilinarian conspiracy was discovered. Lucius Aemilius Paullus announced that he intended to prosecute Lucius Sergius Catilina – not yet known to be responsible for the conspiracy – and Catiline attempted to place himself into the custody of the magistrates. Celer, Catiline's third choice, refused to take him; Paullus regardless never brought charges. As part of the response to the conspiracy's force mustering publicly in the Etruria, Celer was assigned to Picenum to raise forces along with three other magistrates deployed across Italy. He was at the same time likely prorogued to the province of Cisalpine Gaul pro consule. After Catiline's involvement became clear and he fled Rome, Celer played an important role in the campaign suppressing the conspiracy. He blocked Catiline's army from escaping Italy across the Apennines into Gaul, allowing the consul Gaius Antonius Hybrida to bring Catiline to battle in early 62 BC. At the resulting Battle of Pistoria, Antonius' forces decisively defeated Catiline. Some time in 63, Celer was noted as one of the augurs, indicating that he had been inducted by that point into that priestly college.

Celer continued in Cisalpine Gaul through the remainder of the year. While there, he supported his adoptive brother Metellus Nepos against Cicero and the majority in the senate. Nepos as plebeian tribune had attempted to use force in the assemblies to transfer the anti-Catilinarian command from the consul Antonius to Pompey; this triggered a senatus consultum ultimum which saw Nepos flee the city for Pompey's camp.

=== Consulship and death ===
In suo anno ("his year"; ie the first year he was eligible), Celer was elected consul for 60 BC. Lucius Afranius, a Pompeian ally, was his consular colleague. Prior to 62 BC, Celer and his brother Nepos had supported Pompey's political position at Rome while Pompey was on campaign. By 60 BC, the two had turned against Pompey in part because Pompey had divorced Celer's sister Mucia Tertia. The divorce came shortly after Pompey's return to Italy in December 62 BC as part of Pompey's attempts to realign himself politically. However, the divorce – amid claims of infidelity – harmed the public reputation and dignitas of the Caecilii Metelli: the two brothers of Mucia, Celer and Nepos, took this slight very seriously. While Dio claims that Pompey supported Celer's consular campaign, this familial quarrel makes Dio's claim unlikely.

During Celer's consulship, Pompey sought senatorial ratification of his eastern settlements and land grants for his veterans. Lucius Licinius Lucullus, whom Pompey had replaced in command pursuant to the lex Manilia of 66 BC, challenged his rival's actions: instead of approving Pompey's settlements as a whole, Lucullus stalled the entire process by having each element reviewed in committee before separate votes on each part. In this, Lucullus was supported by Celer, Cato the Younger, and Marcus Licinius Crassus. The combined political influence of the four allies was able to prevent Pompey from securing any of his main goals. Celer also opposed Crassus' attempts to reduce the taxes expected from the publicani tax farmers in Asia.

For this strong opposition, the pro-Pompeian plebeian tribune Lucius Flavius had Celer thrown into jail and attempted to keep him there by sitting on a bench before the door. Celer, intending to stay the night, had his allies cut a hole in the wall so that senators could attend to him. Pompey, afraid of the political blowback of holding the consul like a political prisoner, had Flavius set Celer free. Celer also opposed the attempts of his brother-in-law, Publius Clodius Pulcher, in transferring himself from the patricians to the plebeians.

These victories for Celer, however, saw Pompey join a political alliance with the next year's consul, Gaius Julius Caesar, and Crassus. When Caesar's consulship began in 59 BC, Celer opposed the three allies. He died unexpectedly in April 59 BC prior to taking up a proconsulship Transalpine Gaul.

== Family ==
Celer was the grandson of Quintus Caecilius Metellus Balearicus; he was also the biological son of Quintus Caecilius Metellus Nepos, the consul of 98 BC, and the adoptive son of the homonymous Quintus Caecilius Metellus Celer who was plebeian tribune in 90 BC and aedile c. 88 BC.

He married Clodia – daughter of Appius Claudius Pulcher and sister of Publius Clodius Pulcher – and was the cousin or brother of the Mucia Tertia who was Pompey's third wife. With Clodia, he had a daughter named Caecilia Metella. Celer's reputation was dogged, however, by the scandals attached to Clodia. A contemporary poem by Catullus "may refer to Celer's marital ineffectiveness and obtuseness".

== Bibliography ==
=== Modern sources ===
- Alexander, Michael Charles (1990). Trials in the late Roman Republic, 149 BC to 50 BC. Toronto: University of Toronto Press. ISBN 0-8020-5787-X. OCLC 41156621.
- Badian, Ernst (2012). "Caecilius Metellus Celer, Quintus". Oxford Research Encyclopedia of Classics (4th ed.). Oxford University Press. doi:10.1093/acrefore/9780199381135.013.1223. ISBN 978-0-19-938113-5.
- Berry, D H (2020). Cicero's Catilinarians. Oxford University Press. ISBN 978-0-19-751081-0. LCCN 2019048911. OCLC 1126348418.
- Broughton, Thomas Robert Shannon (1952). The magistrates of the Roman republic. Vol. 2. New York: American Philological Association.
- Cadoux, T J (2008). "The Roman carcer and its adjuncts". Greece and Rome. 55 (2): 202–221. doi:10.1017/S0017383508000533. ISSN 0017-3835. S2CID 162709495.
- Drogula, Fred K (2019). Cato the Younger: life and death at the end of the Roman republic. Oxford University Press. ISBN 978-0-19-086902-1.
- Gruen, Erich (1995). The last generation of the Roman republic. Berkeley: University of California Press. ISBN 0-520-02238-6.
- Phillips, E John (1974-12-01). "The Prosecution of C Rabirius in 63 BC". Klio. 56 (56): 87–102. doi:10.1524/klio.1974.56.56.87. ISSN 2192-7669. S2CID 193877825.
- Rafferty, David (2017). "Cisalpine Gaul as a consular province in the late republic". Historia: Zeitschrift für Alte Geschichte. 66 (2): 147–172. doi:10.25162/historia-2017-0008. ISSN 0018-2311. JSTOR 45019257. S2CID 231088284.
- Zmeskal, Klaus (2009). Adfinitas (in German). Vol. 1. Passau: Verlag Karl Stutz. ISBN 978-3-88849-304-1.

=== Ancient sources ===
- Cassius Dio (1914–27). Roman history. Loeb Classical Library. Translated by Cary, Ernest. Cambridge – via LacusCurtius.
- Sallust (2010). Catiline's conspiracy, the Jugurthine War, Histories. Translated by Batstone, William Wendell. Oxford University Press. ISBN 978-0-19-282345-8.

Political offices
Preceded by Marcus Pupius Piso Frugi Calpurnianus; Marcus Valerius Messalla Niger	Roman consul 60 BC with Lucius Afranius	Succeeded by Julius Caesar; Marcus Calpurnius Bibulus
