= Gnaeus Cornelius Lentulus Marcellinus =

Ancient Roman politician

Gnaeus Cornelius Lentulus Marcellinus (c. 90 BC – c. 48 BC) was a Roman statesman and consul of 56 BC. He was married at least twice. His first wife is unknown but his second wife was probably Scribonia, at least twenty years his junior, who later became the second wife of Augustus.

== Biography ==
=== Early life ===
He was the son of Cornelia (the daughter of Publius Cornelius Scipio Nasica) and Publius Cornelius Lentulus Marcellinus.

=== Career ===
We know several offices Marcellinus held over the course of his life. First he was quaestor, in the same year his brother Publius was quaestor for the province of Cyrenaica. After serving as a plebeian tribune, Marcellinus appears in the historical record as a legate of Pompey in 67 BC. After his praetorship, Marcellinus was appointed governor of Syria for the term 59/58 BC.

== Family ==
By his first wife he was the father of Lentulus Marcellinus, Caesar's quaestor put in command of his fortifications at Dyrrhachium in 48 BC. By Scribonia he was father of two children, a boy and a girl. The boy was Cornelius Marcellinus. Some authorities, such as Ronald Syme, believed Cornelius Marcellinus died young; however, John Scheid has persuasively argued that he should be identified with Publius Cornelius Lentulus Marcellinus, consul of 18 BC.

The girl was Cornelia, who married Paullus Aemilius Lepidus (suffect consul in 34 BC), only to die the year her brother ascended to the consulate.

Marcellinus died before 47 BC. Scribonia remarried Augustus and became mother to his only child, Julia the Elder.

Political offices
Preceded by Publius Cornelius Lentulus Spinther and Quintus Caecilius Metellus Nepos Iunior	Consul of the Roman Republic with Lucius Marcius Philippus; 56 BC	Succeeded by Marcus Licinius Crassus and Gnaeus Pompeius Magnus
