= Gnaeus Domitius Calvinus =

Roman consul in 53 and 40 BC

Osca
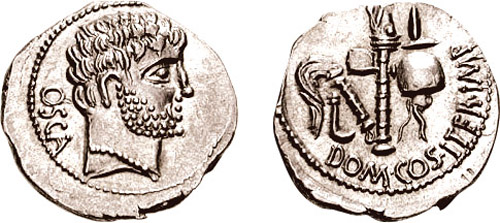
First side of the image: OSCA behind, head of Hercules right, wearing necklace
Second side of the image: DOM. COS. ITER. IMP, simpulum, aspergillum, axe, and apex
AR denarius; 3,78 g. Circa 39–38 BC

Gnaeus Domitius Calvinus was a Roman general, senator and consul (both in 53 BC and 40 BC) who was a loyal partisan of Caesar and Octavianus.

== Biography ==
Domitius Calvinus came from a noble family and was elected consul for 53 BC, despite a notorious electoral scandal. He was on Caesar's side during the Civil War with Pompey. During the campaign in Greece, Caesar sent Domitius with two legions to intercept Metellus Scipio who was bringing the Syrian legions to Pompey. At the decisive Battle of Pharsalus he commanded the centre of Caesar's army. After the battle he became governor of Asia. He tried to oppose the invasion of Pharnaces, the king of Bosphorus, who had taken the occasion of the Roman civil war to invade the province of Pontus; however, he suffered a crushing defeat at the Battle of Nicopolis in Armenia (December of 48 BC). Direct intervention by Caesar brought a quick end to the conflict, and Pharnaces' army was annihilated at Zela in 47 BC. Despite this failure, he remained a trusted friend of Caesar.

Domitius Calvinus's activities immediately after the death of Caesar are unknown, but in 43 BC he was a strong supporter of Octavianus and participated in the civil war against Brutus and Cassius. During the Philippi campaign in 42 BC, he had to bring reinforcements from Italia to Greece for Mark Antony and Octavianus' army, however, his fleet was destroyed by the enemy in the Ionian Sea with the loss of two legions. Despite this defeat, he was awarded the honour of a second consulship in 40 BC and was sent by Octavianus as governor to Hispania, where he remained for three years (39–36 BC). His military activities in Spain were successful since he was saluted as imperator by his troops and on his return, he was awarded a triumph. He also rebuilt the Regia in the Roman Forum. Although there are not many facts concerning his further political activities, an inscription shows that in 20 BC he was still alive and a member of the important Arval Brethren priesthood, reserved only for members of the nascent Imperial family and to the emperor's most distinguished supporters.

Although Domitius Calvinus' career does not show any particular ability, either in politics (he obtained his first consulship only after scandalous bribery) or in war (he suffered two major defeats), he maintained an important political role. (However, it must be said that supporting the winning side all the way through the civil wars, evinces a most extraordinary ability and foresight in both politics and war, or luck.) This was most probably because he was one of the very few Roman nobles to support the Caesar/Octavianus party from the very beginning.

== Family ==
Calvinus had a daughter named Domitia Calvina who married Lucius Calpurnius Bibulus.

== See also ==
- List of Roman consuls

Political offices
| Preceded by Appius Claudius Pulcher and Lucius Domitius Ahenobarbus | Consul of the Roman Republic with Marcus Valerius Messalla Rufus; 53 BC | Succeeded by Quintus Caecilius Metellus Pius Scipio Nasica and Gnaeus Pompeius Magnus |
| Preceded by Publius Servilius Vatia Isauricus and Lucius Antonius | Consul of the Roman Republic with Gaius Asinius Pollio; 40 BC | Succeeded by Lucius Cornelius Balbus and Publius Canidius Crassus |
