= Marcus Favonius =

Roman aedile between 53 and 52 BC

Marcus Favonius (c. 90 BC – 42 BC) was a Roman politician during the period of the fall of the Roman Republic. He is noted for his imitation of Cato the Younger, his espousal of the Cynic philosophy, and for his appearance as the Poet in William Shakespeare's play Julius Caesar.

== Life ==
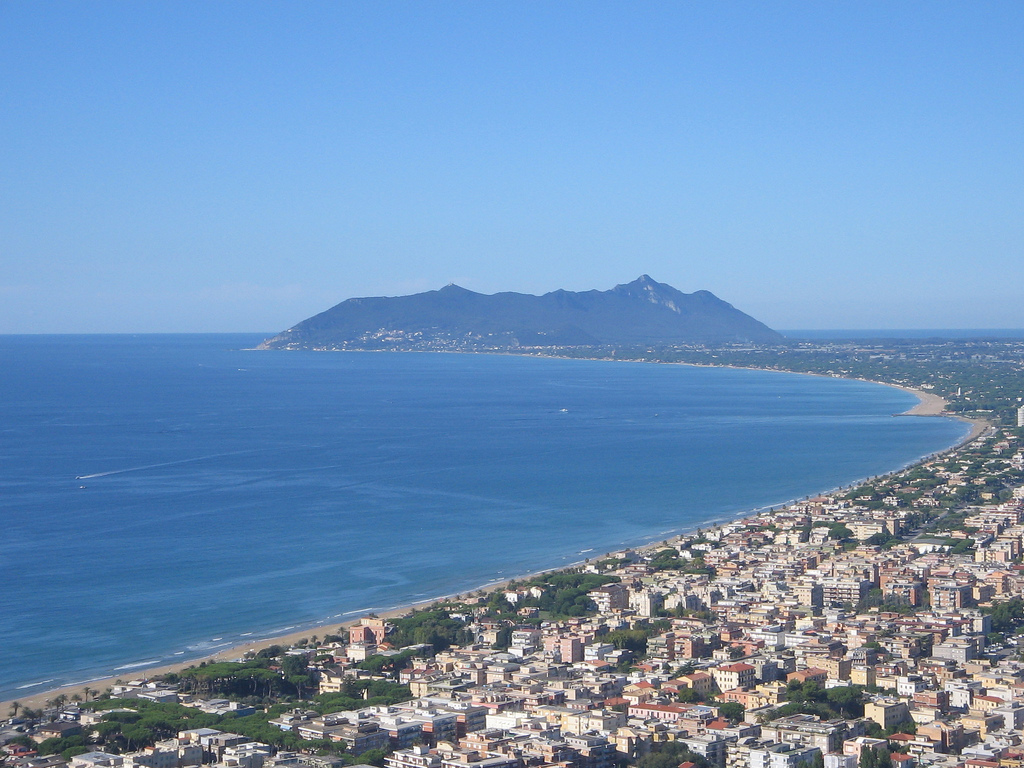
Aerial view of Terracina with the Circeo promontory in the background

Favonius was born in around 90 BC in Tarracina (the modern Terracina), a Roman colony on the Appian Way at the edge of the Volscian Hills. Favonius in Latin means "favourable"; in Roman mythology Favonius was the west wind, whose counterpart in Greek mythology was Zephyrus.

=== Political career ===
Favonius, with the support of Cato, was chosen aedile at some time between 53 and 52 BC. According to Plutarch,

Favonius stood to be chosen aedile, and was like to lose it; but Cato, who was there to assist him, observed that all the votes were written in one hand, and discovering the cheat, appealed to the tribunes, who stopped the election. Favonius was afterwards chosen aedile, and Cato, who assisted him in all things that belonged to his office, also undertook the care of the spectacles that were exhibited in the theatre.

As well as being chosen aedile, he was also chosen quaestor and served as legatus in Sicily, "probably after his quaestorship". Although many classical reference works list Favonius as having been a praetor in 49 BC, it is a matter of some controversy whether or not he was a praetor at any time between 52 and 48 BC. According to F. X. Ryan, in his 1994 article 'The Praetorship of Favonius', the matter hinges on the meeting at the senate at which he bade Pompey "stamp on the ground". "When we are forced to decide whether a man who spoke at a meeting summoned by consuls was a praetor or a senator, all we can say is that probability greatly favors the latter alternative." Cassius Dio wrote of Favonius' relation to Cato that Favonius "imitated him in everything", while Plutarch wrote that Favonius was "a fair character ... who supposed his own petulance and abusive talking a copy of Cato's straightforwardness". An instance of his imitation of Cato's plainspeaking that was ruder and more vehement than the behaviour of his model might have allowed came in 49 BC; in a dispute in the Senate, Pompey, challenged as to the paucity of his forces when Julius Caesar was approaching Rome from Gaul, answered that he not only could call upon the two legions that he had lent to Caesar but could make up an army of 30,000 men. At which Favonius "bade Pompey stamp upon the ground, and call forth the forces he had promised".

According to Plutarch, Favonius was known amongst his fellow Roman aristocrats as a Cynic because of his outspokenness, but a modern writer on Greek philosophy labels him as an "early representative of [the] pseudo-Cynic type" who fell short of the (possibly unattainable) ideal cynicism of the earliest Greek proponents of the doctrine (a slightly later example of the type was Dio Chrysostom). Despite his "wild, vehement manner", Favonius was capable of acts of humility, such as he performed to Pompey when he entertained Deiotarus I of Galatia aboard ship.

Pompey, for want of his servants, began to undo his shoes himself, which Favonius noticing, ran to him and undid them, and helped him to anoint himself, and always after continued to wait upon, and attended him in all things, as servants do their masters, even to the washing of his feet and preparing his supper."

=== Against the triumvirate ===
Favonius was a member of the optimates faction within the Roman aristocracy; in a letter to Caesar on ruling a state (Ad Caesarem senem de re publica oratio), traditionally attributed to Sallust but probably by the rhetorician Marcus Porcius Latro, Caesar is told of the qualities of some of these nobles. Bibulus and Lucius Domitius are dismissed as wicked and dishonourable while Cato is someone "whose versatile, eloquent and clever talents I do not despise." The writer continues,

In addition to those whom I have mentioned the party consists of nobles of utter incapacity, who, like an inscription, contribute nothing but a famous name. Men like Lucius Postumius and Marcus Favonius seem to me like the superfluous deckload of a great ship. When they arrive safely, some use can be made of them; if any disaster occurs, they are the first to be jettisoned because they are of least value.

Like Cato, Favonius opposed the corruption of many of Rome's leading politicians in general and the rise of the First Triumvirate in particular. When Caesar returned from his praetorship in Spain in 59 BC and successfully stood for consul, he allied himself with Pompey (to whom he gave his daughter Julia in marriage) and Clodius. Following an incident in which Cato prevented Caesar from both having a triumph and standing for consulship by a filibustering tactic, after which Cato and Bibulus were physically attacked by Caesar's supporters, Caesar's party demanded two things of the senate: that it sign a law concerning the distribution of land, and that all senators swear an oath promising that they would uphold the law.

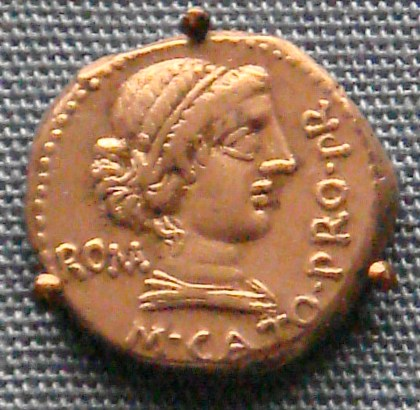
Silver denarius of Cato the Younger (47–46 BC)

According to Plutarch, "heavy penalties were pronounced against such as would not take the oath", which in this case meant exile. A party led by Cicero, Lucullus and Bibulus, to which Cato and Favonius allied themselves, opposed these measures, but eventually either swore the oath or abstained. Cato, however, feared these laws and the oath as not being for the common good but as extensions of the power of Caesar and Pompey; Plutarch writes of Cato that "he was afraid, not of the distribution of land, but of the reward which would be paid for this to those who were enticing the people with such favours." Eventually all senators except Cato and Favonius agreed to Caesar and Pompeys's measures, whereupon Cicero made an oration urging Cato to soften his attitude. According to Plutarch,

The one who was most successful in persuading and inducing him [Cato] to take the oath was Cicero the orator, who advised and showed him that it was possibly even a wrong thing to think himself alone in duty bound to disobey the general will; and that his desperate conduct, where it was impossible to make any change in what had been done, was altogether senseless and mad; moreover, it would be the greatest of evils if he should abandon the city in behalf of which all his efforts had been made, hand her over to her enemies, and so, apparently with pleasure, get rid of his struggles in her defence; for even if Cato did not need Rome, still, Rome needed Cato, and so did all his friends; and among these Cicero said that he himself was foremost, since he was the object of the plots of Clodius, who was openly attacking him by means of the tribuneship.

Finally Cato was persuaded to give up his opposition, followed by Favonius, the last to submit. Plutarch writes, "By these and similar arguments and entreaties, we are told, both at home and in the forum, Cato was softened and at last prevailed upon. He came forward to take the oath last of all, except Favonius, one of his friends and intimates." Upon hearing the news that of the members of the Triumvirate, Caesar was to be given a fresh supply of money, and Pompey and Crassus were to be consuls again the following year, Favonius, "when he found he could do no good by opposing it, broke out of the house, and loudly declaimed against these proceedings to the people, but none gave him any hearing; some slighting him out of respect to Crassus and Pompey, and the greater part to gratify Caesar, on whom depended their hopes".

=== Assassination of Caesar ===
Despite the fact that he opposed Caesar, Favonius, like Cicero, was not invited by Brutus and Cassius to participate in the plot to assassinate Caesar in 44 BC. In his Life of Brutus, Plutarch wrote,

As indeed there were also two others that were companions of Brutus, Statilius the Epicurean, and Favonius the admirer of Cato, whom he left out for this reason: as he was conversing one day with them, trying them at a distance, and proposing some such question to be disputed of as among philosophers, to see what opinion they were of, Favonius declared his judgment to be that a civil war was worse than the most illegal monarchy.

=== Execution after Philippi ===
After Caesar's death in March 44 BC, Favonius became an opponent of his successors in the Second Triumvirate. According to Cicero's letter to Atticus of 8 June 44 BC, Favonius was present at a meeting of the Liberatores who opposed Antony's near-dictatorial regime. Also present at this meeting were Cicero, Brutus, Cassius, Porcia Catonis, Servilia and Junia Tertia. Along with Cicero, his brother Quintus Tullius Cicero, and Lucius Julius Caesar, Favonius was proscribed by the triumvirate, and imprisoned after Antony and Octavian (later Augustus) defeated the forces of Brutus and Cassius at the Battle of Philippi (42 BC). His imprisonment did little to assuage his intemperate behaviour. According to Suetonius, "Marcus Favonius, the well-known imitator of Cato, saluted Antonius respectfully as Imperator when they were led out in chains, but lashed Augustus to his face with the foulest abuse." Favonius' abuse was apparently as a result of Octavian's brutal treatment of the prisoners captured at Philippi.

Of his death Cassius Dio wrote,

Most of the prominent men who had held offices or still survived of the number of Caesar's assassins or of those who had been proscribed straightway killed themselves, or, like Favonius, were captured and put to death; the remainder escaped to the sea at this time and later joined Sextus.

Favonius' slave Sarmentus, who was bought after his master's death when his estate was sold, is claimed to have become a catamite of the emperor Augustus. Modern-day historian Josiah Osgood says this might have been as a slander "planted by supporters of Marc Anthony", but both ancient and contemporary students of Roman sexuality have observed that a man's sexual use of his own slaves, male or female, was not a target for social condemnation at the time. Sarmentus was the subject of Quintus Dellius' complaint to Cleopatra that while he and other dignitaries were served sour wine by Antony in Greece, Augustus' catamite was drinking Falernian in Rome.

== Legacy ==
=== Shakespeare's Julius Caesar ===
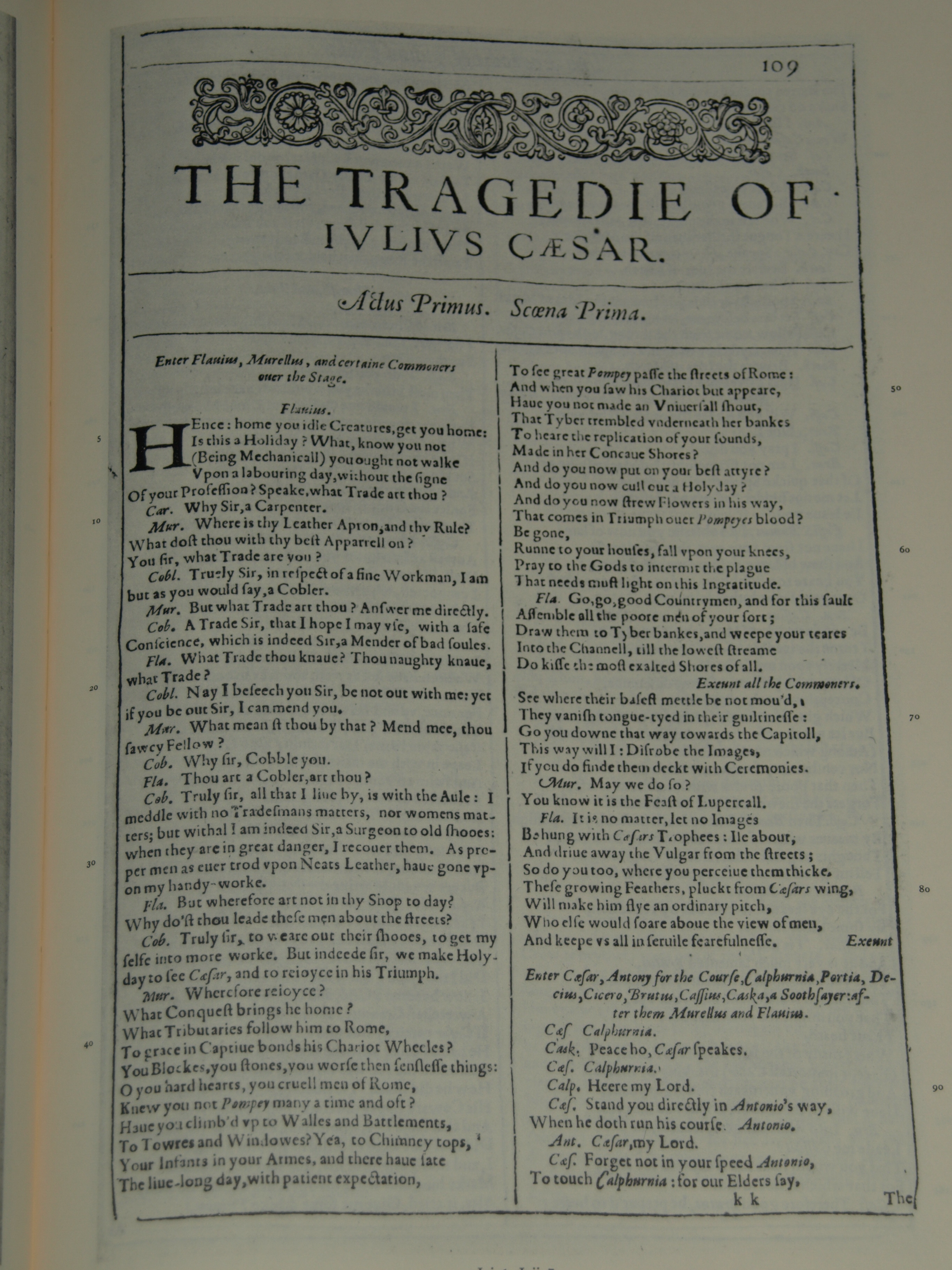
Facsimile of the first page of Julius Caesar from the First Folio of 1623

Favonius is the character known as the Poet who appears in Act IV Scene III of William Shakespeare's play Julius Caesar. Shakespeare took the details of this scene from Plutarch's Parallel Lives, in which, on Brutus' journey to Sardis, Plutarch writes that Brutus and Cassius fell into a dispute in an apartment (Shakespeare assigns this scene to Brutus' tent), which ultimately led to their sharing angry words and both of them bursting in tears. Their friends attempted to break into the room to see what the dispute was about and forestall any mischief, but were prevented from doing so by a number of attendants. Favonius, however, was not to be stopped. According to Plutarch,

Marcus Favonius, who had been an ardent admirer of Cato, and, not so much by his learning or wisdom as by his wild, vehement manner, maintained the character of a philosopher, was rushing in upon them, but was hindered by the attendants. But it was a hard matter to stop Favonius, wherever his wildness hurried him; for he was fierce in all his behaviour, and ready to do anything to get his will. And though he was a senator, yet, thinking that one of the least of his excellences, he valued himself more upon a sort of cynical liberty of speaking what he pleased, which sometimes, indeed, did away with the rudeness and unseasonableness of his addresses with those that would interpret it in jest. Favonius, breaking by force through those that kept the doors, entered into the chamber, and with a set voice declaimed the verses that Homer makes Nestor use – "Be ruled, for I am older than ye both." At this Cassius laughed; but Brutus thrust him out, calling him impudent dog and counterfeit Cynic; but yet for the present they let it put an end to their dispute, and parted. Cassius made a supper that night, and Brutus invited the guests; and when they were set down, Favonius, having bathed, came in among them. Brutus called out aloud and told him he was not invited, and bade him go to the upper couch; but he violently thrust himself in, and lay down on the middle one; and the entertainment passed in sportive talk, not wanting either wit or philosophy.

In Shakespeare's version of this encounter in Julius Caesar, Favonius' opening lines in his role as Poet are:
POET. [Within] Let me go in to see the generals; There is some grudge between 'em, 'tis not meet they be alone.

Forcing his way into Brutus' tent, he addresses Brutus and Cassius:
POET. For shame, you generals! what do you mean? Love, and be friends, as two such men should be; For I have seen more years, I'm sure, than ye.

To which, Cassius replies:
CASSIUS. Ha, ha! how vilely doth this cynic rhyme!

and Brutus drives him from his tent. Here Shakespeare departs from Plutarch's account of the scene, as Favonius does not feature in Brutus and Cassius' subsequent drinking bout.

== Bibliography ==
- Geiger, J. (1974). "Favonius: three notes". RSA. 4: 161–70.
- Linderski, J. (1972). "The Aedileship of Favonius, Curio the Younger and Cicero's Election to the Augurate". Harvard Studies in Classical Philology. 76: 181–200. doi:10.2307/310984. JSTOR 310984.
- Ryan, F. X. (1994). "The Praetorship of Favonius". American Journal of Philology. 115 (4): 587–601. doi:10.2307/295487. JSTOR 295487.
- Ryan, F. X. (1994). "The Quaestorship of Favonius and the Tribunate of Metellus Scipio". Athenaeum. 82: 505–521.
