= Pedius =

Pedius may refer to:

- Pedius (beetle), a genus of beetles in the family Carabidae
- Quintus Pedius (consul) (d. 43 BC), Roman general, politician, great nephew of dictator Julius Caesar, maternal cousin to Roman emperor Augustus
- Quintus Pedius Poplicola (fl. 1st century BC), son to Quintus Pedius, senator and orator
- Quintus Pedius (painter), son to Quintus Pedius Publicola, and first deaf person recorded by name
- Sextus Pedius (50–120), Roman jurist

== See also ==
- Pedia gens
