= Pedia =

Pedia may be:

- the plural of pedion, a triclinic crystal form having a single face
- an abbreviation of encyclopedia (...pedia)
- an abbreviation of pediatrics
- Pedia gens, an ancient Roman family
- A nickname for Wikipedia

== See also ==
- Paidia, a genus of moths
- Paideia, a concept in Greek and Roman society
