= Pedia gens =

Ancient Roman family

The gens Pedia was a plebeian family at ancient Rome. Members of this gens are first mentioned in history during the final century of the Republic, and for the next two centuries they were distinguished in statesmanship, rhetoric, art, and law. The first of the Pedii to obtain the consulship was Quintus Pedius, the nephew of Caesar, in 43 BC.

== Origin ==
Little is known of the Pedii and their origin. The nomen Pedius might be derived from the cognomen Pedo, a name referring to someone with broad feet.

== Praenomina ==
The main families of the Pedii used the praenomina Quintus and Sextus, both of which were very common throughout Roman history. Individual families used other names, such as Lucius, Gaius, Marcus, Publius, Titus, Gnaeus, and Numerius.

== Branches and cognomina ==
The Pedii of the Republic do not seem to have had any hereditary surnames, but one member of the family bore the cognomen Poplicola or Publicola, famous from an early family of the Valerii; the surname means "one who courts the people." Although this cognomen appears in other families, the Pedii were connected with the Valerii Messallae, a later family of the Valeria gens which revived the more ancient surname, and it seems clear that it was through this relationship that the name appears among the Pedii.

Not long after the time of this family, another branch appears bearing the surname Hirrutus, of uncertain origin. The first of this family rose to prominence early in the reign of Tiberius, and although the name does not appear again until the second century, one of the Pedii Hirruti obtained the consulship in AD 158. The jurist Sextus Pedius may have belonged to this family, although proof is wanting; other prominent Pedii during this period may also have belonged to this branch.

== Members ==
This list includes abbreviated praenomina. For an explanation of this practice, see filiation.

- Quintus (or Marcus) Pedius, father of the consul, was probably the husband of Julia and brother-in-law of Caesar.
- Quintus Pedius, the nephew of Caesar, (Note: Suetonius describes Pedius as the grandson of Caesar's eldest sister, but as he was a grown man with official duties as early as 57 BC, when he was one of his uncle's legates in the Gallic War, it seems more likely, as Glandorp suggests, that he was Julia's son, rather than her grandson.) served as legates under his uncle during the Gallic War and the Civil War, and in 45 BC received a triumph for his victories. He was consul suffectus in 43, together with his cousin, Octavian, the future emperor, and addressed the people in order to avert a rebellion over the proscriptions of the triumvirs, but died from stress and fatigue the following night.
- Quintus Pedius Q. f. Poplicola, quaestor urbanus in 41 BC, is described by Horace as a famous orator. He is generally supposed to have been the son of the consul Quintus Pedius, and father of the painter.
- Quintus Pedius Q. f. Q. n., the grandson of Caesar's nephew, was mute from birth, but under the supervision of his uncle, Messalla Corvinus, and with the approval of Augustus, he was tutored in painting, at which he became greatly skilled. Pedius died before reaching adulthood.
- Lucius Pedius Blaesus, proconsul of Crete and Cyrenaica during the reign of Nero, was expelled from the senate in AD 59 for having plundered the temple of Aesculapius at Cyrene, and for other acts of corruption. He was restored to the senate by Otho in 69.
- Gnaeus Pedius Cascus, consul suffectus ex Kal. Apr. in AD 71, with the future emperor Domitian.
- Sextus Pedius, a prominent jurist who lived during later first and early second centuries. His original works have been lost, but he is cited in the Digest by Julius Paulus and Ulpian, among others, and best known for his common-sense approach to legal interpretation.
- Sextus Pedius Sex. f. Palpinianus, a procurator Augusti, and the father of Sextus Pedius Justus.
- Sextus Pedius Sex. f. Sex. n. Justus, son of the procurator, erected monuments to his parents, and to his father-in-law, Marcus Aurelius Julianus.
- Gaius Pedius, dedicated a monument at Rome to his sister, Fortunata, aged twenty years and forty days.
- Sextus Pedius, named in an inscription from Madauros in Africa Proconsularis.
- Titus Pedius, possibly a standard-bearer in one of the legions, buried at Mesembria in Moesia Inferior.
- Pedius Amemptio, buried at Rome, aged two years, four months, three days, with a monument from his father, Amemptus.
- Sextus Pedius Castrensis, named in an inscription from Teate Marrucinorum.
- Sextus Pedius Dexter, named in an inscription from Teate.
- Sextus Pedius Euanthus, named in an inscription from Teate.
- Marcus Pedius M. l. Gratus, a freedman buried at Larinum in Apulia.
- Pedia Hilara, buried at Larinum.
- Sextus Pedius Luciscus, buried at Madauros, aged seventy-one.
- Sextus Pedius Tarentini f. Luciscus, buried at Mons Mopti, the present site of the village of Oued Deheb, formerly part of Mauretania Caesariensis, aged eighty.
- Marcus Pedius M. l. Lucrio, a freedman buried at Larinum.
- Publius Pedius Marianus, husband of Publicia Ifis, buried at Catana, aged twenty-five.
- Numerius Pedius N. l. Onesimus, a freedman, buried at Beneventum in Campania.
- Gnaeus Pedius Phosphorus, named in an inscription from Rome.
- Quintus Pedius Sequens, named in a list of soldiers at Rome in AD 70.
- Pedius Severus, buried at Catana in Sicilia, with a monument dedicated by his mother, Arria Volumnilla, and his son, Gaius Pedius Severus.
- Publius Pedius Severus, patron of Publicia Ifis, aged sixty-eight, to whom be dedicated a monument at Catana in Sicilia.
- Titus Pedius Severus, buried at Catana, aged eighteen.

=== Pedii Hirruti ===
- Sextus Pedius Sex. f. Lusianus Hirrutus, having served as a military prefect under Germanicus, became governor of Raetia and Vincolicia, and the valley of the Alpes Poeninae.
- Sextus Pedius Sex. f. Hirrutus, a man of praetorian rank, could perhaps be the same as the jurist.
- Sextus Pedius Sex. f. Sex. n. Hirrutus Lucilius Pollio, had a distinguished career, serving as praefectus aerarii militaris, judicial legate for Asturia and Gallaecia, praetor, and consul in AD 158.

== See also ==
- List of Roman gentes

== Bibliography ==
- Marcus Tullius Cicero, Epistulae ad Atticum, Pro Plancio.
- Gaius Julius Caesar, Commentarii de Bello Gallico (Commentaries on the Gallic War), Commentarii de Bello Civili (Commentaries on the Civil War), De Bello Hispaniensis (On the War in Spain, attributed).
- Quintus Horatius Flaccus (Horace), Satirae (Satires).
- Marcus Velleius Paterculus, Compendium of Roman History.
- Gaius Plinius Secundus (Pliny the Elder), Naturalis Historia (Natural History).
- Publius Cornelius Tacitus, Annales, Historiae.
- Gaius Suetonius Tranquillus, De Vita Caesarum (Lives of the Caesars, or The Twelve Caesars).
- Appianus Alexandrinus (Appian), Bellum Civile (The Civil War).
- Lucius Cassius Dio Cocceianus (Cassius Dio), Roman History.
- Digesta, or Pandectae (The Digest).
- Johann Glandorp, Onomasticon Historiae Romanae, André Wechel son Fils, Frankfurt (1589).
- Dictionary of Greek and Roman Biography and Mythology, William Smith, ed., Little, Brown and Company, Boston (1849).
- Theodor Mommsen et alii, Corpus Inscriptionum Latinarum (The Body of Latin Inscriptions, abbreviated CIL), Berlin-Brandenburgische Akademie der Wissenschaften (1853–present).
- Wilhelm Henzen, Ephemeris Epigraphica: Corporis Inscriptionum Latinarum Supplementum (Journal of Inscriptions: Supplement to the Corpus Inscriptionum Latinarum, abbreviated EE), Institute of Roman Archaeology, Rome (1872–1913).
- Bulletin Archéologique du Comité des Travaux Historiques et Scientifiques (Archaeological Bulletin of the Committee on Historic and Scientific Works, abbreviated BCTH), Imprimerie Nationale, Paris (1885–1973).
- René Cagnat et alii, L'Année épigraphique (The Year in Epigraphy, abbreviated AE), Presses Universitaires de France (1888–present).
- George Davis Chase, "The Origin of Roman Praenomina", in Harvard Studies in Classical Philology, vol. VIII (1897).
- Stéphane Gsell, Inscriptions Latines de L'Algérie (Latin Inscriptions from Algeria, abbreviated ILAlg), Edouard Champion, Paris (1922–present).
- Paul A. Gallivan, "The Fasti for A.D. 70–96", in Classical Quarterly, vol. 31, pp. 186–220 (1981).
