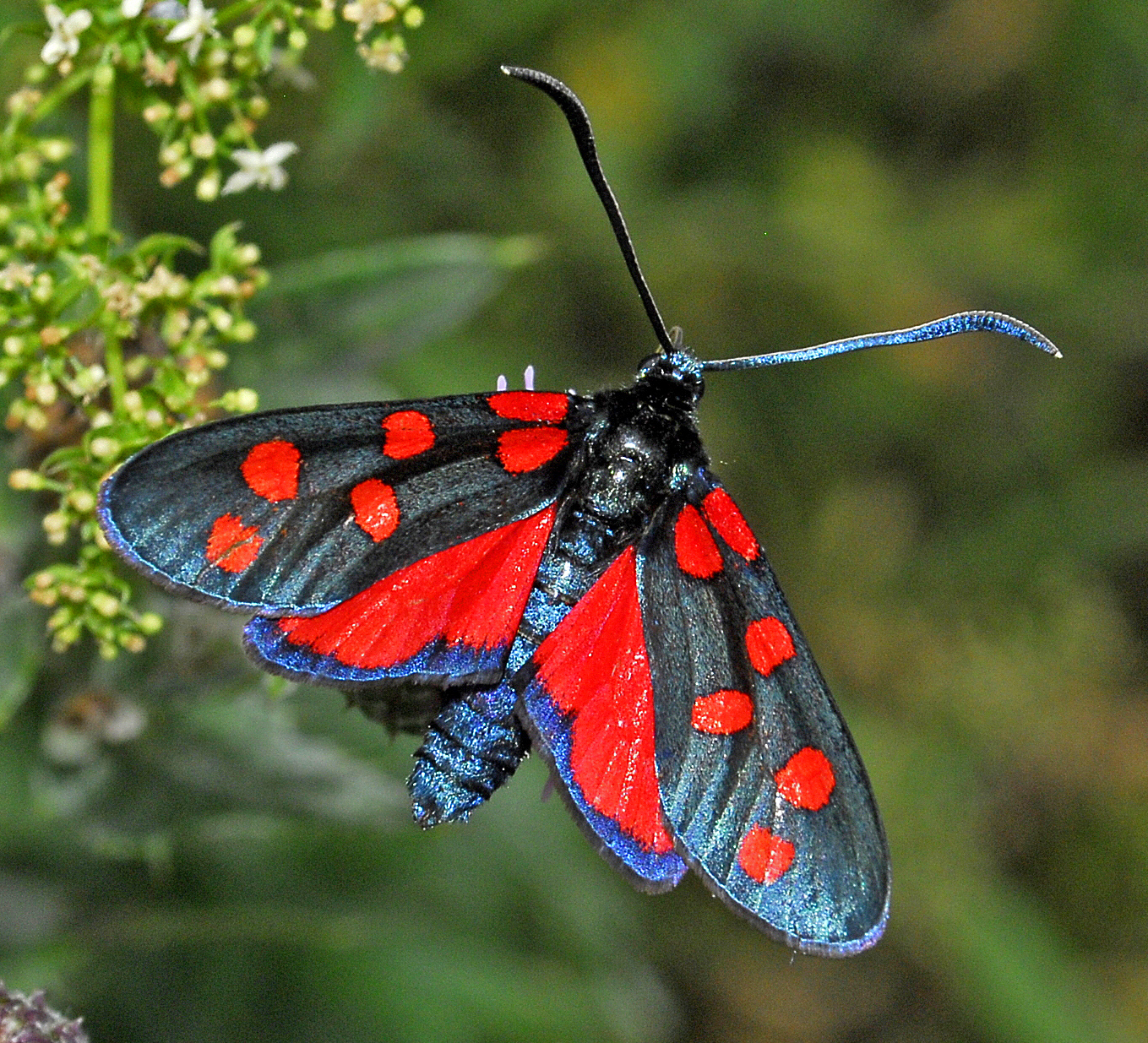
- Zygaena transalpina. Dorsal view
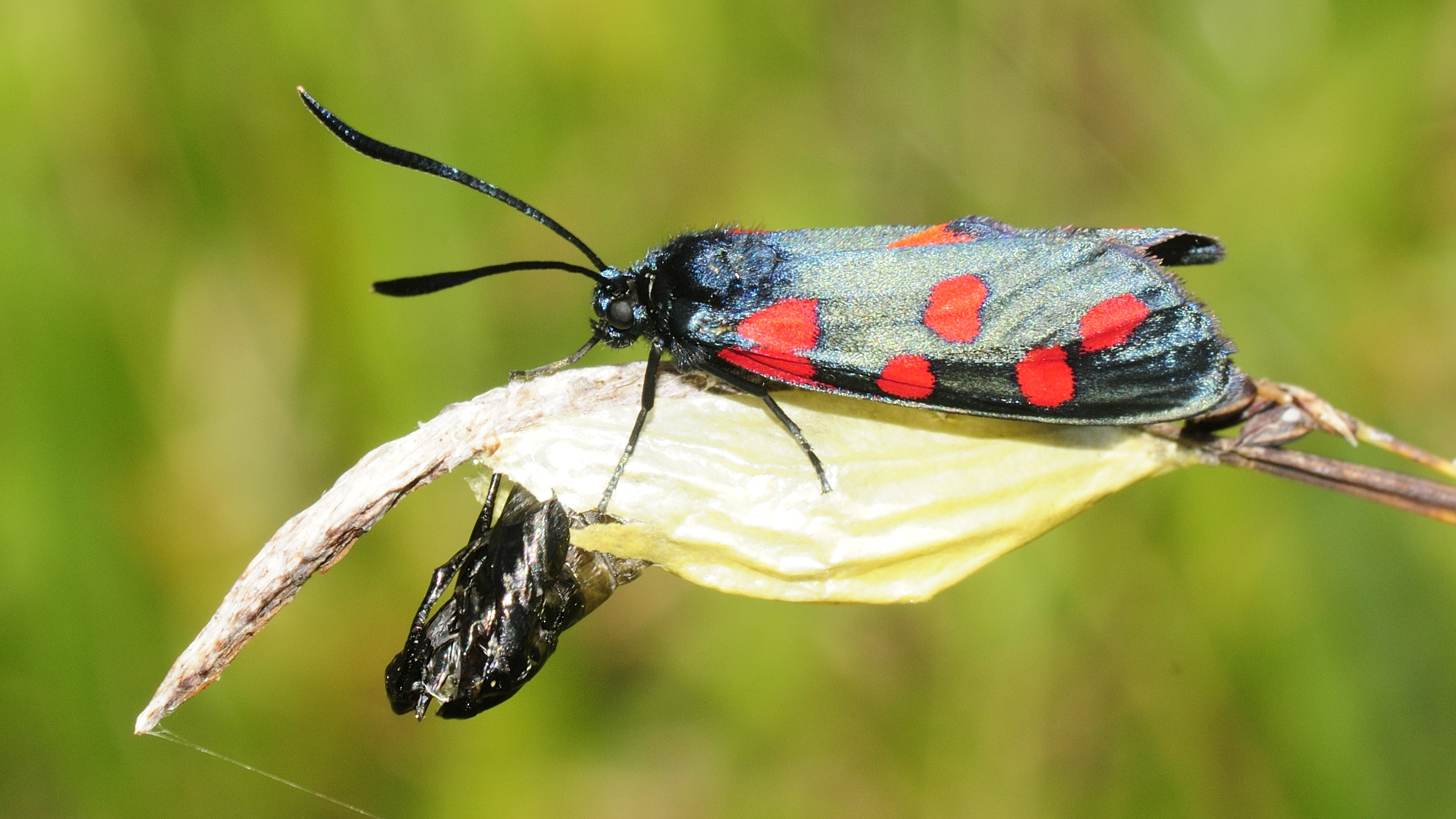
- Side view

Scientific classification
- Domain: Eukaryota
- Kingdom: Animalia
- Phylum: Arthropoda
- Class: Insecta
- Order: Lepidoptera
- Family: Zygaenidae
- Genus: Zygaena
- Species: Z. transalpina

Binomial name
- Zygaena transalpina (Esper, 1780)

Synonyms
- Sphinx astragali Borkhausen, 1793; Sphinx hippocrepidis Hübner, 1799; Sphinx ratisbonica Scheven, 1782; Sphinx transalpina Esper, 1780; Zygaena alpina Boisduval, 1834; Zygaena maritima Oberthür, 1898; Zygaena xanthographa Germar, 1835

= Zygaena transalpina =

Species of moth

Zygaena transalpina is a moth of the family Zygaenidae.

== Subspecies ==
Subspecies include the following:

- Zygaena transalpina transalpina
- Zygaena transalpina alpina Boisduval, 1834
- Zygaena transalpina altitudinaria Turati, 1910
- Zygaena transalpina annae Aistleitner, 1979
- Zygaena transalpina astragali (Borkhausen, 1793)
- Zygaena transalpina bavarica Burgeff, 1922
- Zygaena transalpina centralis Oberthur, 1907
- Zygaena transalpina centricataloniae Burgeff, 1926
- Zygaena transalpina centripyrenaea Burgeff, 1926
- Zygaena transalpina collina Burgeff, 1926
- Zygaena transalpina curtisi Tremewan, 1961
- Zygaena transalpina dufayi Dujardin, 1965
- Zygaena transalpina emendata Verity, 1916
- Zygaena transalpina gulsensis Daniel, 1954
- Zygaena transalpina helvetica Bethune-Baker & Rothschild, 1921
- Zygaena transalpina hilfi Reiss, 1922
- Zygaena transalpina hippocrepidis Hübner, 1799
- Zygaena transalpina intermedia Rocci, 1914
- Zygaena transalpina jugi Burgeff, 1926
- Zygaena transalpina latina Verity, 1920
- Zygaena transalpina maritima Oberthur, 1898
- Zygaena transalpina marujae Tremewan & Manley, 1965
- Zygaena transalpina miltosa Candeze, 1883
- Zygaena transalpina philippsi Romei, 1927
- Zygaena transalpina provincialis Oberthur, 1907
- Zygaena transalpina pseudoalpina Turati, 1910
- Zygaena transalpina rupicola Rocci, 1936
- Zygaena transalpina sorrentinaeformis Rocci, 1938
- Zygaena transalpina splugena Burgeff, 1926
- Zygaena transalpina subalticola Rocci, 1918
- Zygaena transalpina tenuissima Burgeff, 1914
- Zygaena transalpina tilaventa Holik, 1935
- Zygaena transalpina xanthographa Germar, 1836

== Distribution ==
This species can be found from Germany to Croatia and Italy, and from Spain to Austria and Slovenia. It is more frequent at more than 2,000 meters of altitude in the Alps, especially in the Italian Alps and Italy, with the exception of Sicily and the Adriatic coast.

== Habitat ==
This moth occurs in warm, dry climates, particularly on dry meadows, but also on flowering grasslands at higher elevations. Though the form astragali extends beyond 50° latitude, being still common near Mombach (Mainz), Darmstadt, etc. Southern Europe, especially Italy, must be considered the principal locality of the species, the forms here flying occurring from May to July in really surprising numbers; maritima flies in great abundance even in dull weather and till nightfall on the southern slopes of the Riviera, near Genoa, Pegli, Savona, etc., transalpina being likewise very common in the southern valleys of the Alps of Ticino, extending into the North Italian plains.

== Description ==
The wingspan of Zygaena transalpina can reach about 29–35 millimetres (1.1–1.4 in). The forewings are of a shining bluish-green, or of a blue-black, with three pairs of carmine-red spots for each wing (in some individuals of both sexes, the spots are only five ). The two spots on the base are oval. The hind wings are carmine red, with a black-blue border and a slightly darker fringe. The underside of the forewings is light black-blue, usually with the same spots as the top.

== Technical description and variation (Seitz) ==
Z. transalpina Esp. (= medicaginis O.; charon, angelicae Boisd.) Very highly coloured: metallic black-blue or -green, with 6 small, widely separated, somewhat black-edged spots. The very bright red hindwing is broadly margined with black. On the underside of the forewing, all the red spots are merged in the name-typical form. – ab. flava Dziurz. is the (accidental) light-yellow aberration. – ab. ferulae Led. [synonym of transalpina ], which occurs in the southern Alps and extends sporadically into Southern Germany, is red and has still smaller spots on the forewing than name-typical transalpina, but is hardly separable from it as a distinct form. – In ab. nigricans Oberth. (= brunnea Dziurz.) the red has changed into a coffee colour, as in ab. chrysanthemi of filipendulae. – boisduvali Costa (= xanthographa Germ.) has yellow spots on the forewing (5 or 6), and a yellow streak or heart-shaped spot on the otherwise black hindwing; South Italy. – ab. zickerti Hofm. [ synonym of ssp. xanthographa Germar, [1836] ] is similar to boisduvali, but the hindwing is all black, being without the yellow central spot. Flying sparingly among the preceding. – astragali Bkh. (= hippocrepidis Hbn.; angelicae Boisd.) [now subspecies] is of magnificent vermilion colour, with 6 large spots on the forewing and a narrow marginal band to the hindwing. The forewing below is uniformly vermilion (without separation into spots), with black margin. This is the northern form, which occurs in France, South and Central Germany, and Belgium, being said (probably erroneously) to extend as far as Sweden. – Specimens of this form with an abdominal belt are named by Hirschke astragali. ab. cingulata. – ab. miltosa Cand.[now subspecies] is founded on a small specimen from La Rochelle in which the spots of the upperside are also confluent. – sorrentina Stgr. [ synonym of ssp. xanthographa Germar, [1836] ] resembles boisduvali, but the spots are red, and the spot of the hindwing is often very small; Southern Central Italy (Naples). – calabrica Calb. (= spicae Stgr.) [synonym of ssp. xanthographa Germar, [1836] ] is quite black, with very small red spots, the spot of the hindwing being only vestigial, the insect, therefore, resembling stoechadis; South Italy. – maritima Oberth. [ now subspecies] is, like the name-typical form, very bright red, but the black margin of the hindwing is wider and more sinuate; the (6) spots of the forewing below are not confluent; Riviera. – italica Dziurz. [ synonym of ssp. collina Burgeff, 1926 ] the same, but has only 5 spots; Northern Italy. – Larva green, with black dorsal stripe, and yellow lateral line, above which there are triangular black spots. Pupa black, abdomen greenish white; in a light-yellow cocoon.

This species is very similar to Zygaena filipendulae. They can be distinguished by the color of the apex of the antennae (whitish and sharper in Z. transalpina, black in Z. filipendulae). Moreover, in Z. transalpina, spot 6, when present, is clearly separated from stain 5, and even spots 3 and 4 are more distant than in Z. filipendulae.

== Biology ==
Adults are on wing from the end of May to August in one generation per year. The imagines are lively and active insects, taking perhaps quickest to the wing of all the Burnets. They likewise simulate death when suddenly touched, but revive soon and whiz quickly away, the flight being fast.

It is an aposematic species because its warning colors signal it as toxic to predators such as birds and lizards. In case of attack, it emits a liquid containing cyanide.

The larvae feed on the leaves of Hippocrepis comosa and sometimes Coronilla varia and Lotus corniculatus. Larvae can be found from August, after overwintering, to June of the following year.

== Gallery ==
Mounted specimen. Dorsal side

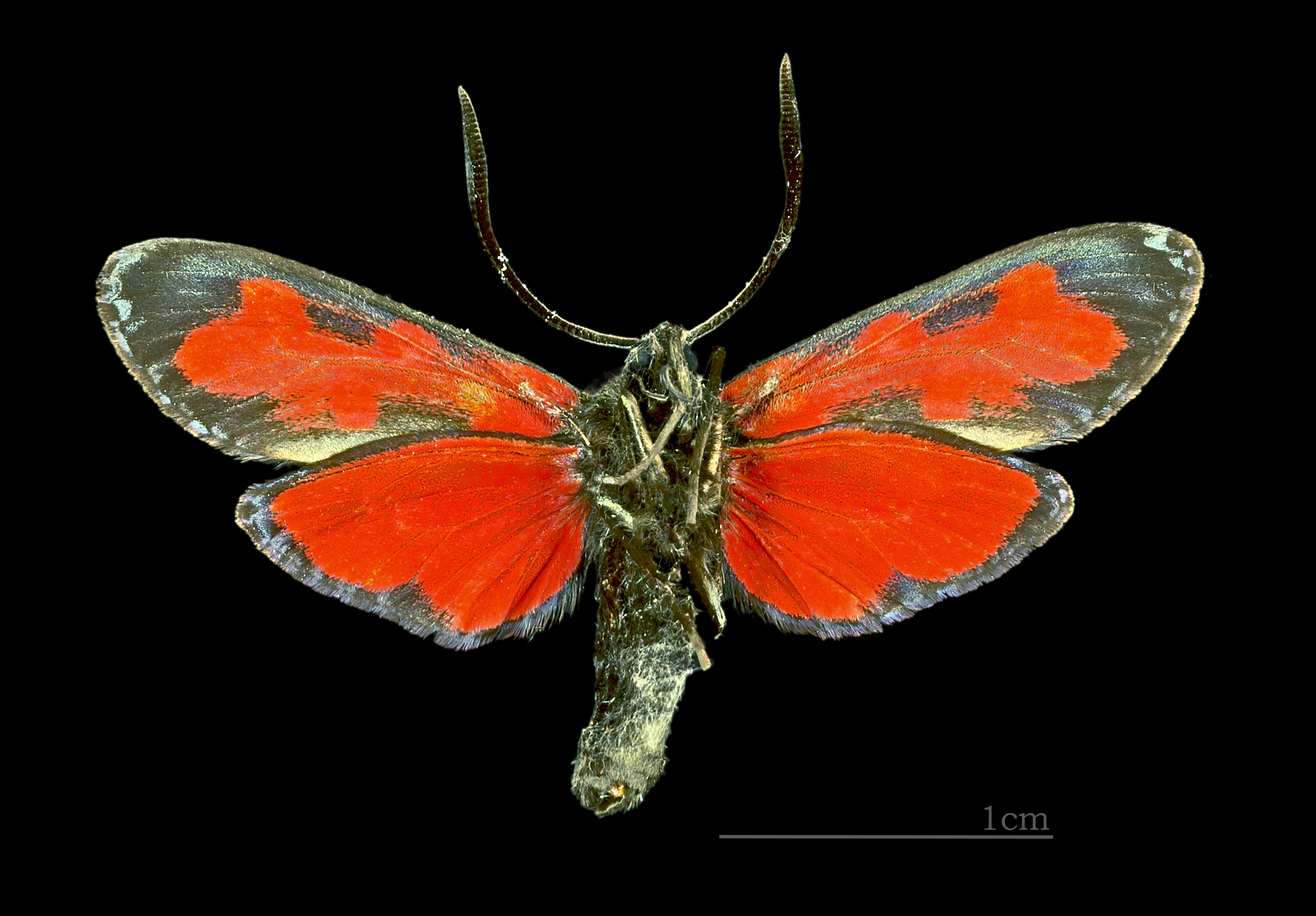
Ventral side

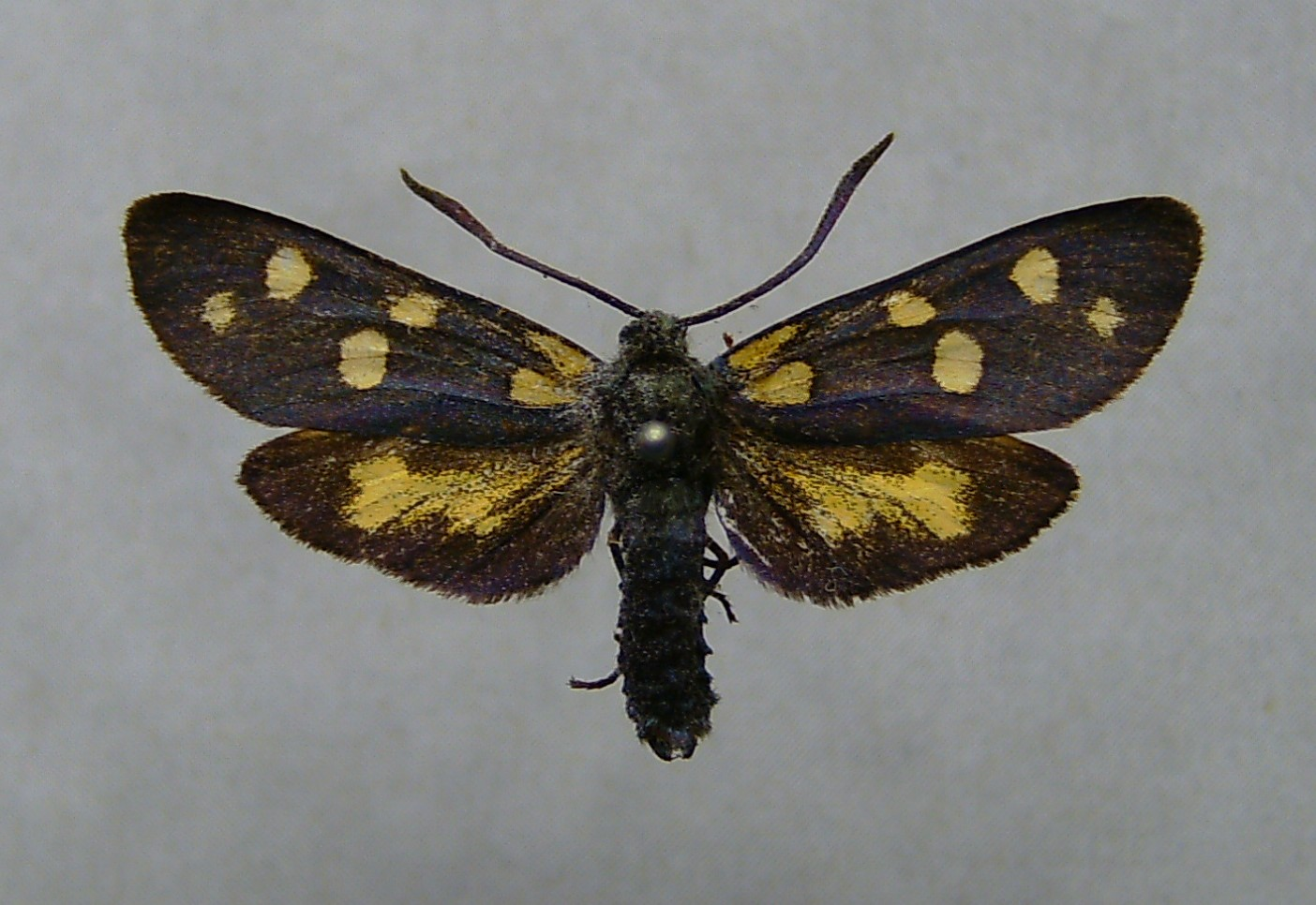
Yellow form

== Bibliography ==
- Šašić, Martina; Nahirnić, Ana; Tarmann, Gerhard M. (31 December 2016). "Zygaenidae (Lepidoptera) in the Lepidoptera collections of the Croatian Natural History Museum". Natura Croatica: Periodicum Musei Historiae Naturalis Croatici. 25 (2): 233–248. doi:10.20302/NC.2016.25.19. eISSN 1848-7386. Useful for subspecies distribution.
