= Lucius Licinius Murena (consul 62 BC) =

Roman military leader and politician

Lucius Licinius Murena was a Roman politician and soldier. He was an officer (legate) in the Third Mithridatic War, a governor (propraetor) of Gallia Transalpina from 64 to 63 BC and a consul in 62 BC. He stood trial because of charges of electoral bribery. Cicero, who defended him, immortalized him in one of his published speeches.

== Life ==
Lucius Licinius Murena was son and namesake of Lucius Licinius Murena who had fought in the Second Mithridatic War. He began his public career as quaestor in c. 75 BC. When the Third Mithridatic War began, in 73 BC, Murena was appointed legatus for Lucius Licinius Lucullus, the proconsul in charge of the Roman war effort in the east and a fellow Licinius. Murena served in the East for several years; he had the command of one of Lucullus's legions, and in 72 BC Lucullus even entrusted him with the siege of Amisus, a major Pontic city.

In 65 BC, Murena was urban praetor and made himself popular by the magnificence of the games he provided.

After his praetorship, Murena was the governor of Gallia Transalpina in 64 BC and part of 63 BC. On his way there he levied some troops in Umbria. Cicero said that "[t]he republic enabled him to display his liberality, which he did so effectually as to engage in his interest many tribes which are connected with the municipalities of that district [Umbria]." He returned to Rome from Gaul before the end of his term to stand for the consulship for 62 BC and left his brother, Gaius Murena, in charge of the province as his deputy. Cicero said that his "conduct in his province procured him the affection of many influential men, and a great accession of reputation" and that "he contrived by his equity and diligence to enable many of our citizens to recover debts which they had entirely despaired of."”

In 63 BC, Cicero managed to have Murena elected as one of the consuls for 62 BC instead of Lucius Sergius Catilina. However, before entering office he was accused of electoral bribery by the famous jurist Servius Sulpicius Rufus, whom he had defeated in the election (Sulpicius would attain the consulship himself in 51 BC).

The prosecution case was presented by both Sulpicius Rufus and Marcus Porcius Cato the Younger. According to Plutarch, Cato was aware that there had been electoral bribery, and swore to prosecute any successful candidates who had taken part. However, he ruled out pursuing his own brother-in-law, Decimus Junius Silanus, who won the senior consulship. He thus confined himself to prosecuting Murena. In turn, Murena appointed a man to keep Cato under observation - the law stated that a defendant could do this to ensure the fairness of the prosecutor's evidence. However, Murena's agent was impressed by Cato's integrity, and told Cato that if, on a given day, he told him that he was not pursuing the case, the agent would take his word for it and go away. During the trial, Cicero, acting as Murena's advocate, took advantage of Cato's well-known Stoic principles to joke about their obvious paradoxes. In return, Cato sarcastically remarked that Rome had been blessed with a comic consul.

Murena was defended by Marcus Licinius Crassus (who three years later became a member of the First Triumvirate), Quintus Hortensius, and Sulpicius' friend Cicero (in the extant speech Pro Murena) and was acquitted. It is possible, however, that Murena was in fact guilty. Much of our information about Murena's life and career comes from the contents of Cicero's speech.

In the trial, Murena was reproached for having adorned the triumph of his father with military gifts (as well as sharing in the triumph), and that he had lived in luxury whilst on military campaign. With regard to the triumph, Cicero argued that such actions were legitimate because he had served in the war under his father's command. He added that the fact that he served in a war left no room for speaking ill of him. Murena was also accused of being a dancer, which characterised him as a person of less dignity. Cicero dismissed the relevance of this. He also dismissed the suggestion that Sulpicius’ patrician status was higher than that of Murena, a new man, and made favourable points in regard to Murena's. He also argued that Murena's electoral success was also due to the return of his soldiers for the election, as they remembered his generosity from when he was serving with them.

During his consulship, Murena and Decimus Junius Silanus, his consular colleague, passed a law (the lex Junia Licinia) which enforced more strictly, with greater punishment for not complying, the provisions of the lex Caecilia Didia of 98 BC, which provided that: 1) laws should be promulgated (notified publicly) a trinundium (either three Roman eight-day weeks or tertiae nundinae, on the third market-day, 17 days) before they were proposed to the comitia (the popular assembly); 2) leges saturae ("stuffed" laws), that is, statutes dealing with heterogeneous subject matter, were forbidden. Thus, a single statute could not be a collection of unrelated measures. It further enacted that, in order to prevent forgery, a copy of every proposed statute should be deposited before witnesses in the aerarium before it was put to the vote of the popular assembly.

== Notes ==
Political offices
| Preceded by M. Tullius Cicero; G. Antonius Hybrida | Consul of Rome; 62 BC; With: Decimus Junius Silanus | Succeeded by M. Pupius Piso Frugi Calpurnianus; M. Valerius Messalla Niger |
