= Marcus Pupius Piso Frugi Calpurnianus =

Roman senator

Marcus Pupius Piso Frugi Calpurnianus was a Roman senator. Originally a member of the gens Calpurnia, which claimed descent from Numa Pompilius, the second king of Rome, a Calpurnius Piso Frugi, he was adopted by Marcus Pupius, when the latter was an old man. He retained, however, his family-name Piso.

== Life ==
Piso had attained some importance as early as the first civil war. On the death of Lucius Cornelius Cinna, in 84 BC, he married his wife Annia, and in the following year, 83, was appointed quaestor to the consul Lucius Cornelius Scipio. But he quickly deserted this party, and went over to Sulla, who compelled him to divorce his wife on account of her previous connection with Cinna. Piso was the father of Marcus Pupius Piso Frugi, a Roman politician who may have been praetor in 44 BC and could have been a legatus in 40 BC. His grandson may have been Marcus Licinius Crassus, consul of 14 BC.

He failed in obtaining the aedileship, and the year of his praetorship is uncertain. After his praetorship he received the province of Spain with the title of proconsul, and on his return to Rome in 69 BC, enjoyed the honour of a triumph, although it was asserted by some that he had no claim to this distinction.

Piso served in the Third Mithridatic War as a legatus of Gnaeus Pompeius Magnus, who sent him to Rome in 62, to become a candidate for the consulship, as he was anxious to obtain the ratification of his acts in Asia, and therefore wished to have one of his friends at the head of the state. Piso was accordingly elected consul for the following year, 61, with Marcus Valerius Messalla Niger. In his consulship he gave great offense to Cicero, by not asking him first in the senate for his opinion, and still further increased the anger of the orator by taking Publius Clodius under his protection after his violation of the mysteries of the Bona Dea. Cicero revenged himself on Piso, by preventing him from obtaining the province of Syria, which had been promised to him. Piso must have died, in all probability, before 47 BC, for in 47 BC Marcus Antonius inhabited his house at Rome.

Political offices
Preceded by Decimus Junius Silanus; Lucius Licinius Murena	Roman consul 61 BC; With: Marcus Valerius Messalla Niger	Succeeded by Lucius Afranius; Q. Caecilius Metellus Celer
