= Lex Caecilia Didia =

Ancient Roman law

The lex Caecilia Didia was a law put into effect by the consuls Q. Caecilius Metellus Nepos and Titus Didius in the year 98 BC. This law had two provisions. The first was a minimum period between proposing a Roman law and voting on it, and the second was a ban of miscellaneous provisions in a single Roman law. This law was reinforced by the lex Junia Licinia in 62 BC, an umbrella law introduced by Lucius Licinius Murena and Decimus Junius Silanus.

== Provisions ==
The Bobbio Scholiast describes the first provision: "The Caecilian and Didian law decreed that the period of trinundium be observed for promulgating laws." The lex Caecilia Didia, then, determined how much time had to be allowed between the publication of a law and its vote in the assembly. The period of time designated by trinundium has been taken to mean either three Roman eight-day weeks (that is, 24 days) or tertiae nundinae, on the third market-day (17 days).

The second provision of the lex Caecilia Didia forbade leges saturae, "stuffed" laws, which were statutes dealing with heterogeneous subject matters. This meant that in a single Roman bill, there could not be a collection of unrelated measures — what might in modern terms be called omnibus bills. Cicero gave an interpretation of the law in his Oratio de domo sua ("Speech concerning His House") after his return from exile: "What other force, what other meaning, I should like to know, has the Caecilian and Didian law, except this; that the people are not to be forced in consequence of many different things being joined in one complicated bill."

It did not take long for the lex Caecilia Didia to be put into action. Most significantly, in 91 BC the consul Lucius Marcius Philippus, in his capacity as an augur, managed to have the laws of the tribune Marcus Livius Drusus the Younger abrogated on the grounds that they contravened the second provision of the lex Caecilia Didia. This act is often seen as a major contributory factor in the outbreak of the Social War (91–88 BC).

== Political background ==
The lex Caecilia Didia was a direct response to the events of 100 BC and an attempt to reduce hasty legislation passed in the comitia. In that year, Gaius Marius gained his sixth term as consul. Under Marius, the popularist tribune Saturninus and the praetor Glaucia proposed and passed liberal land laws assigning land in the province of Africa to Marius's veterans. However, the radical nature of these bills and the forcible methods Saturninus and Glaucia used in ensuring their passage alienated a large part of the Roman people and eventually even Marius. As a result, Saturninus's laws were repealed, and the lex Caecilia Didia was introduced. The goal was to curb the passage of radical bills, with the assumption that the period of trinundium would give the citizens time to understand the proposed law or to be persuaded to vote against it.

== See also ==
- Roman Law
- List of Roman laws
- Rider (legislation)
