= Paidia elegantia =

Scientific classification
- Kingdom: Animalia
- Phylum: Arthropoda
- Clade: Pancrustacea
- Class: Insecta
- Order: Lepidoptera
- Superfamily: Noctuoidea
- Family: Erebidae
- Subfamily: Arctiinae
- Genus: Paidia
- Species: P. elegantia

Binomial name
- Paidia elegantia de Freina & Witt, 2004

Species of moth

Paidia elegantia is a moth of the family Erebidae. It was described by Josef J. de Freina and Thomas Joseph Witt in 2004. It is found in southern Iran.
