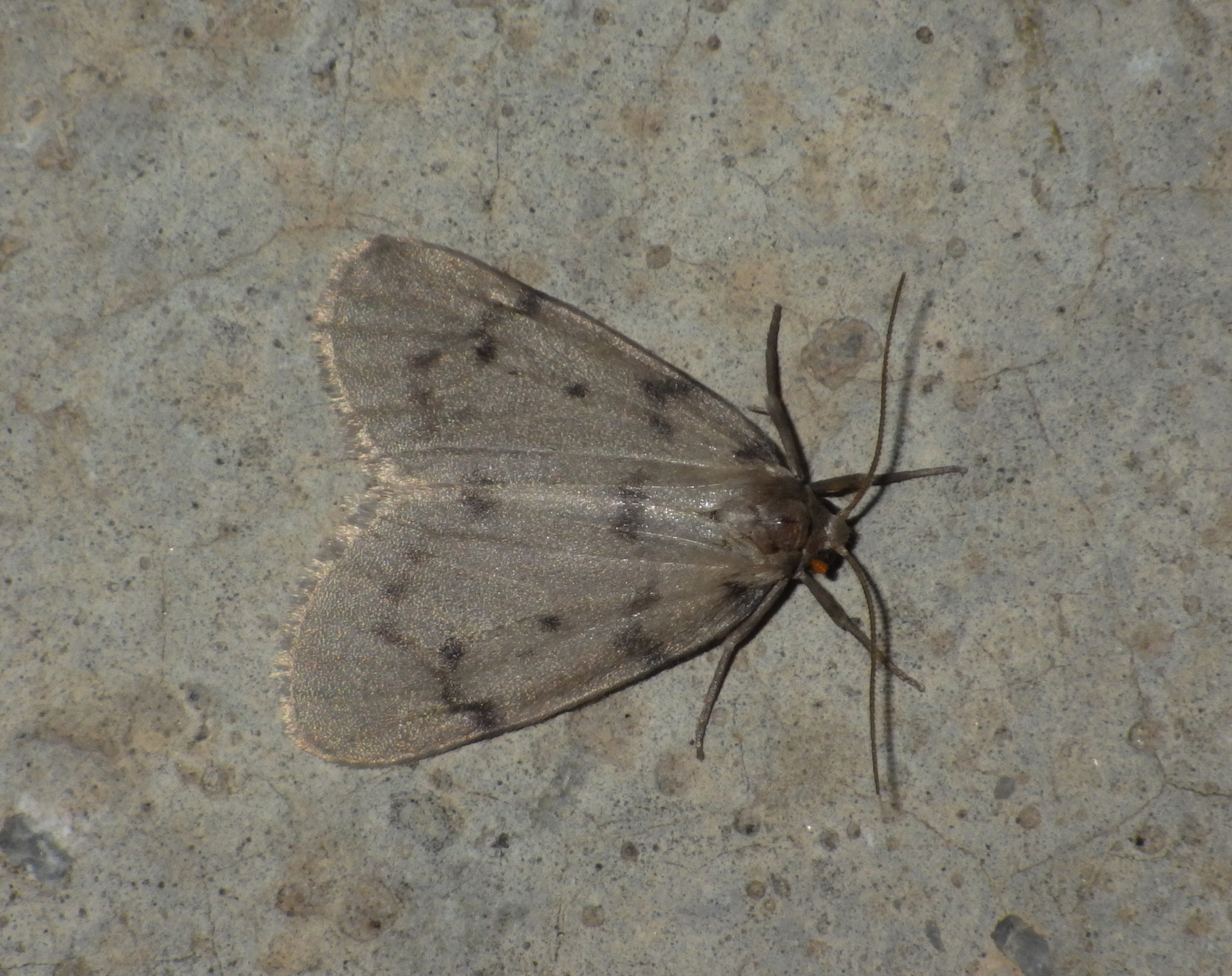

Scientific classification
- Kingdom: Animalia
- Phylum: Arthropoda
- Class: Insecta
- Order: Lepidoptera
- Superfamily: Noctuoidea
- Family: Erebidae
- Subfamily: Arctiinae
- Genus: Paidia
- Species: P. minoica

Binomial name
- Paidia minoica de Freina, 2006

= Paidia minoica =

Species of moth

Paidia minoica is a species of moth in the family Erebidae. It was first described by Josef J. de Freina in 2006. It is found on Crete, where its habitats consists of forest fringes, wide forest clearings and fringes of shrubland on rocky soils at altitudes ranging from the lowlands to 1,400 meters above sea-level.

The wingspan is about 27 mm. Adults are on wing from May to June and again in October in the lowlands. At higher elevations, adults are on wing from late July to late September.

== Etymology ==
The species is named from the mythological King Minos.
