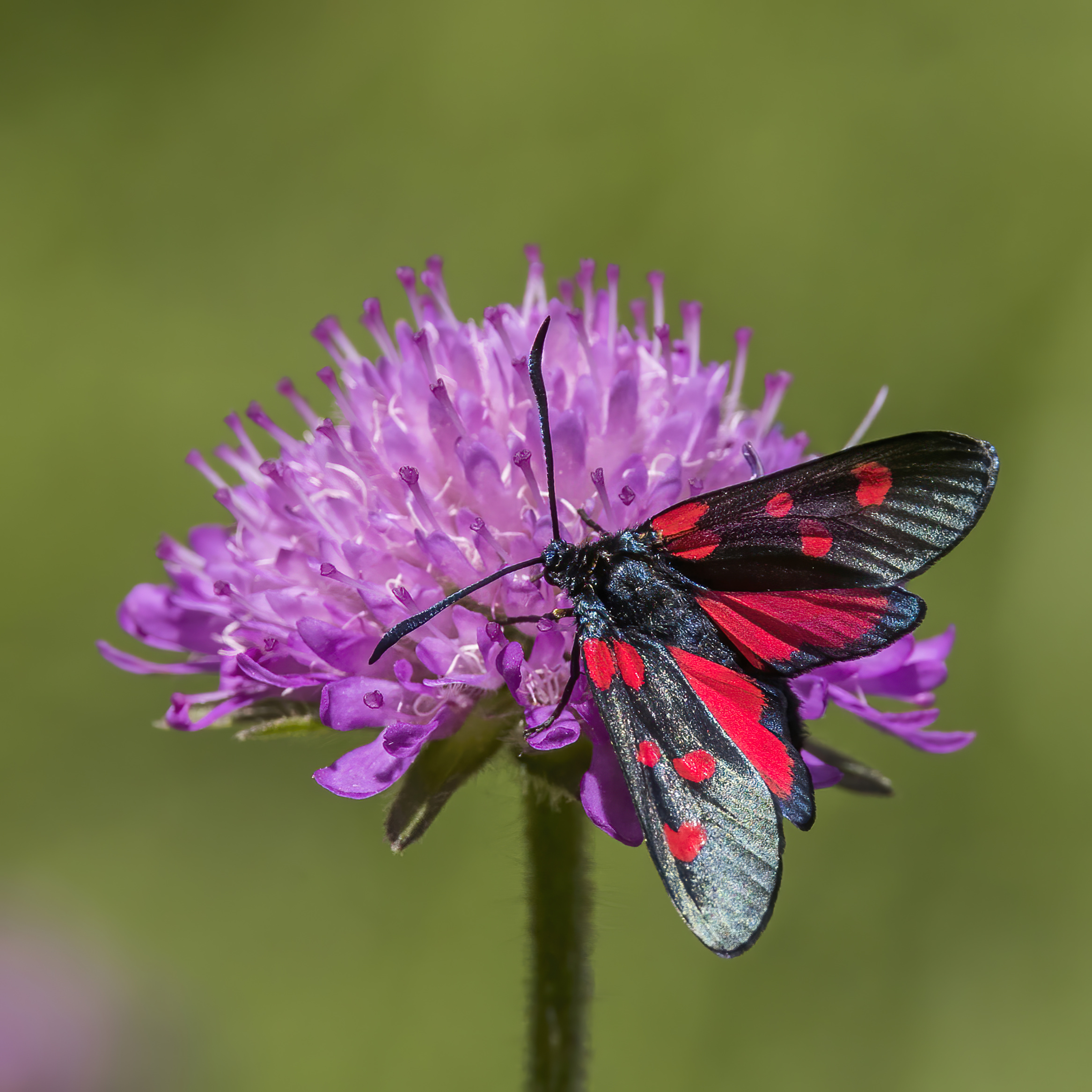

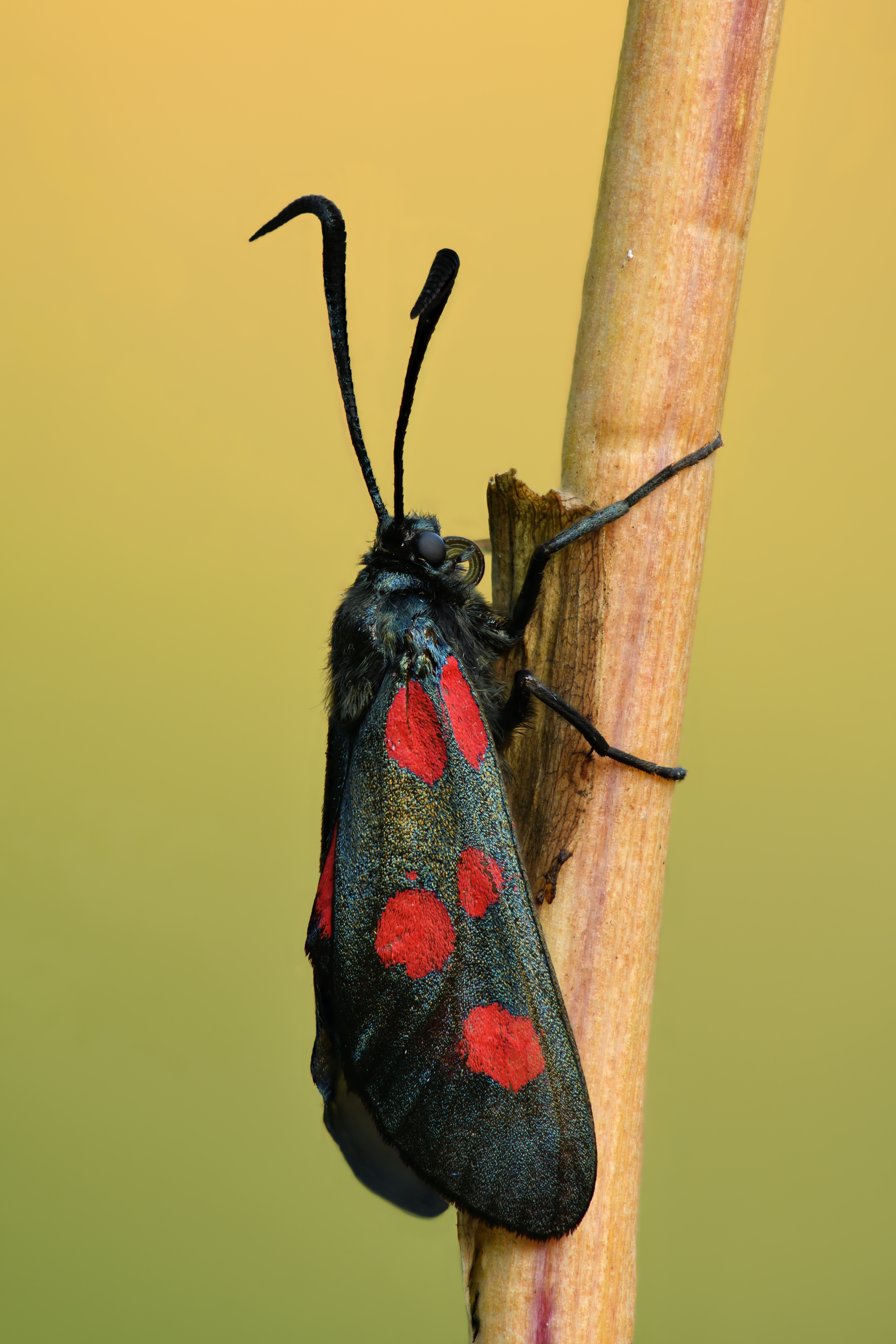

Scientific classification
- Kingdom: Animalia
- Phylum: Arthropoda
- Clade: Pancrustacea
- Class: Insecta
- Order: Lepidoptera
- Family: Zygaenidae
- Genus: Zygaena
- Species: Z. lonicerae

Binomial name
- Zygaena lonicerae (Scheven, 1777)

Synonyms
- Sphinx lonicerae Scheven, 1777; Anthrocera latomarginata Tutt, 1899

= Zygaena lonicerae =

Narrow-bordered five-spot burnet

Species of moth

Zygaena lonicerae, the narrow-bordered five-spot burnet, is a moth of the family Zygaenidae. The species was first described by Theodor Gottlieb von Scheven in 1777.

== Subspecies ==
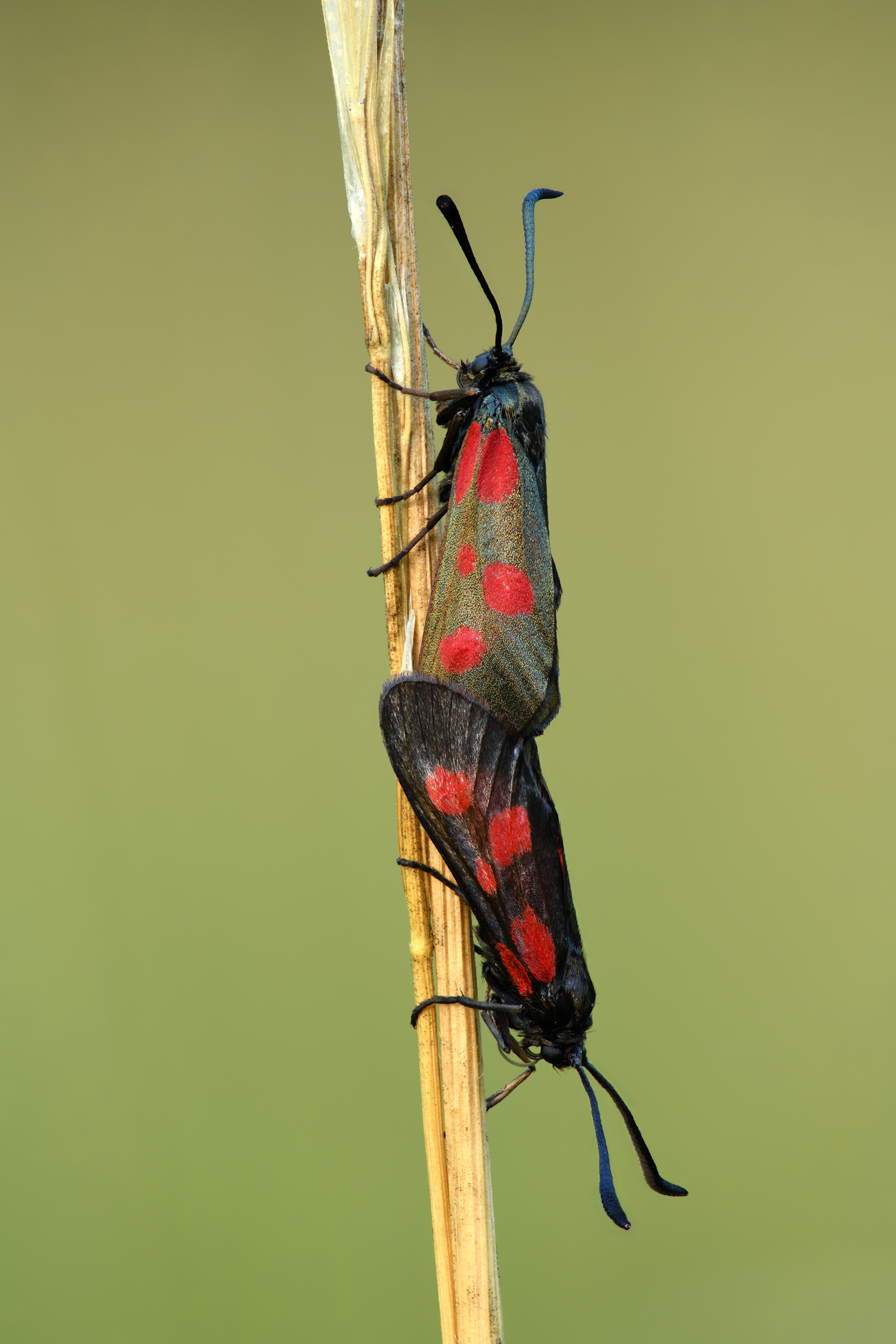
Mating

- Zygaena lonicerae lonicerae
- Zygaena lonicerae abbastumana Reiss, 1922
- Zygaena lonicerae alpiumgigas Verity, 1925
- Zygaena lonicerae insularis Tremewan, 1960 (Ireland)
- Zygaena lonicerae intermixta Verity, 1925
- Zygaena lonicerae jocelynae Tremewan, 1962 (Isle of Skye)
- Zygaena lonicerae kalkanensis Reiss, 1932
- Zygaena lonicerae latomarginata (Tutt, 1899) (England)
- Zygaena lonicerae leonensis Tremewan, 1961
- Zygaena lonicerae linnei Reiss, 1922
- Zygaena lonicerae microdoxa Dujardin, 1965
- Zygaena lonicerae nobilis Navàs, 1924
- Zygaena lonicerae silana Burgeff, 1914
- Zygaena lonicerae thurneri Holik, 1943
- Zygaena lonicerae vivax Verity, 1920

== Distribution ==
This species can be found in most of Europe, from Ireland to Fennoscandia, up to west of China. In the southern Europe the species is widespread from northern and central Spain to Turkey and the Caucasus.

== Habitat ==
In western Europe it prefers dry to mesophilic habitats in coastal areas, sea-cliffs, open forests, grassland, chalk downland and subalpine valleys, at an elevation up to 2,000 metres (6,600 ft) above sea level.

== Description ==
Zygaena lonicerae have a wingspan of 30–46 millimetres (1.2–1.8 in). The forewings reach a length of 16–19 millimetres (0.63–0.75 in) in the females, while they are slightly smaller in males. The forewings usually show five crimson to vermilion spots and a black basic colour, with a strong bluish or blue-green reflection. The third spot is smaller than the fourth one. Head, thorax and abdomen are black and moderately to strongly hairy. The antennae are long and slender and slightly clavate (club shaped) and tapered. The females are similar to males, but the top of the front wing is slightly rounded and the abdomen and the thorax are less hairy. However this species is very variable. Usually the moth populations in alpine areas are much larger, while those from southern Europe are darker.

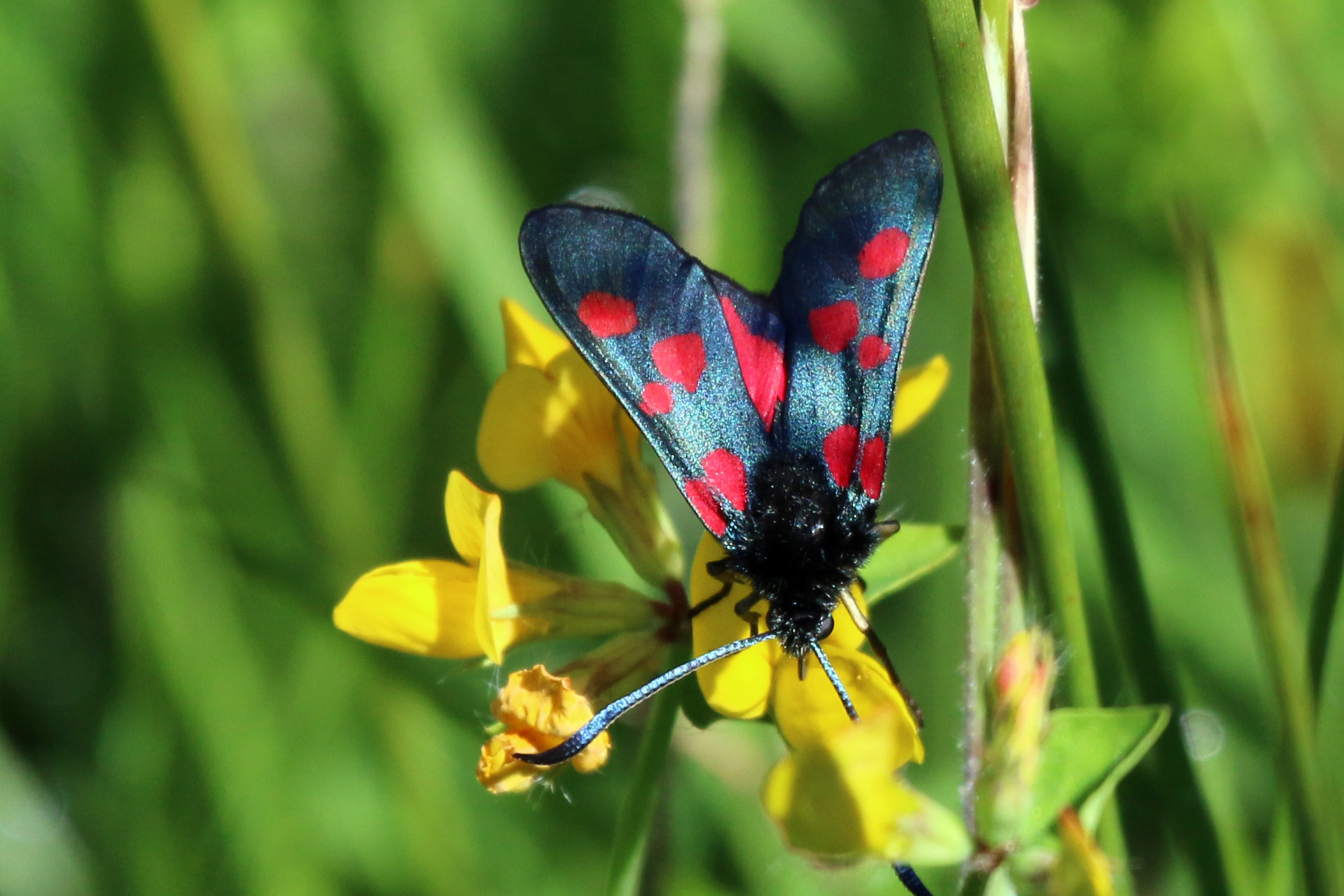

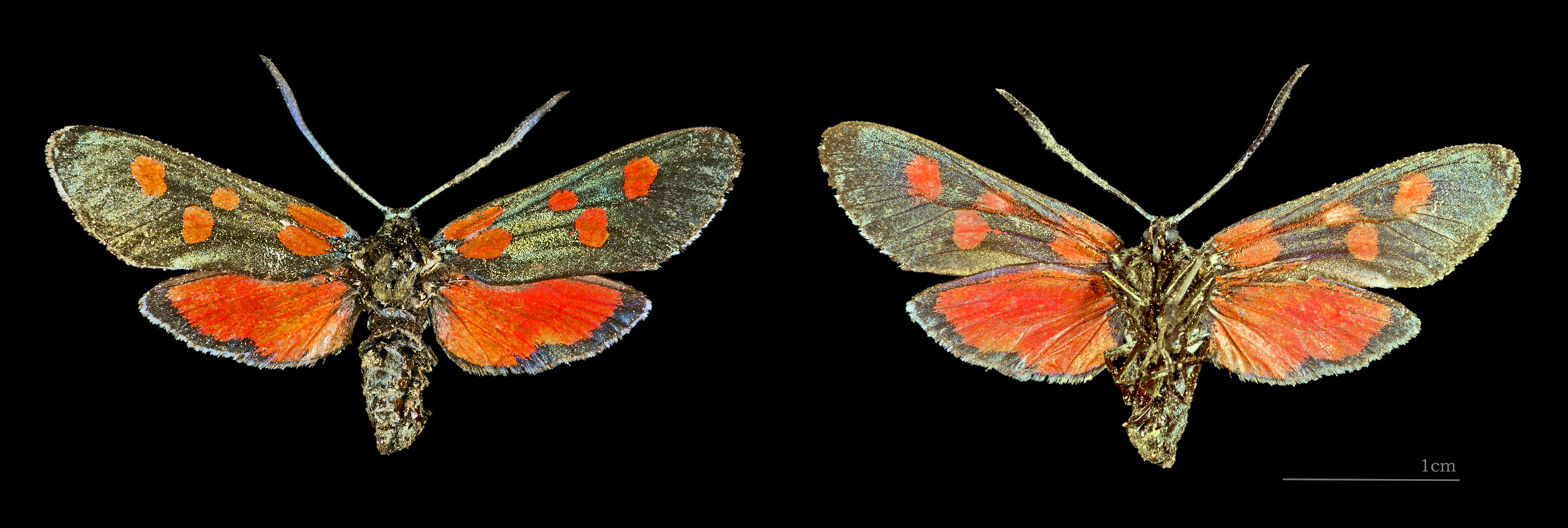
Both sides

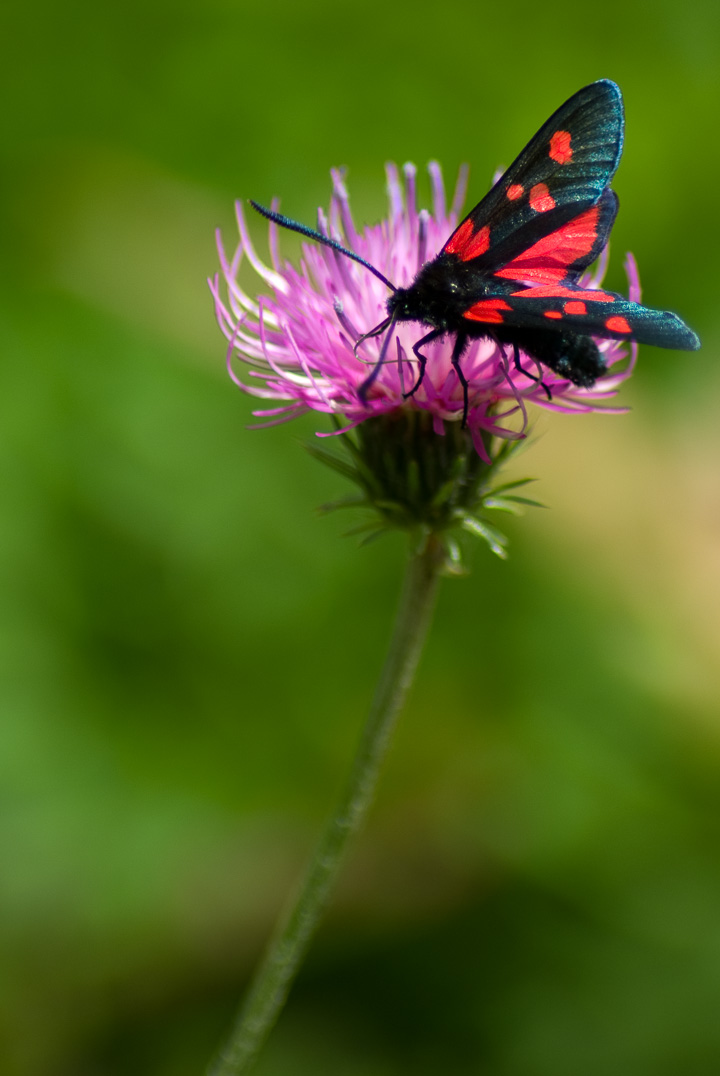
Lateral with open wings

== Life cycle ==
The moth flies during daytime from June to early August depending on the location. They suck nectar of the preferred blue violet flowers, such as on field scabious (Knautia arvensis), dove pincushion flower (Scabiosa columbaria), meadow knapweed (Centaurea jacea), panicle knapweed (Centaurea stoebe), creeping thistle (Cirsium arvense), bulbous thistle (Cirsium tuberosum) and ring thistle (Carduus).

The females lay eggs in July on the underside of leaves of the host plants or on plants that grow close to them. The eggs are pale yellow. The caterpillars reach a length of 19 to 28 millimetres. They are bluish green or pale yellow, with long pale hairs and a few rows of almost rectangular black spots.

The larvae feed on various low-growing plants, including Trifolium (Trifolium medium, Trifolium montanum, Trifolium pratense, Trifolium repens) and Lathyrus species (Lathyrus pratensis, Lathyrus linifolius, Lathyrus sativus), as well as Vicia, Lotus corniculatus, Lotus uliginosus, Onobrychis viciifolia. Larvae and pupae are occasionally parasitized by Tachinidae species (Phryxe magnicornis) and by some species of wasps.

The larvae eat until late summer and early winter, and continue to develop in the following year. At the end of May the caterpillars are fully grown. The not fully grown caterpillars overwinter a second time. The caterpillars pupate in an elongated or spindle-shaped yellowish or white cocoon on grasses and other plants. The colour of pupa varies from brown to black.

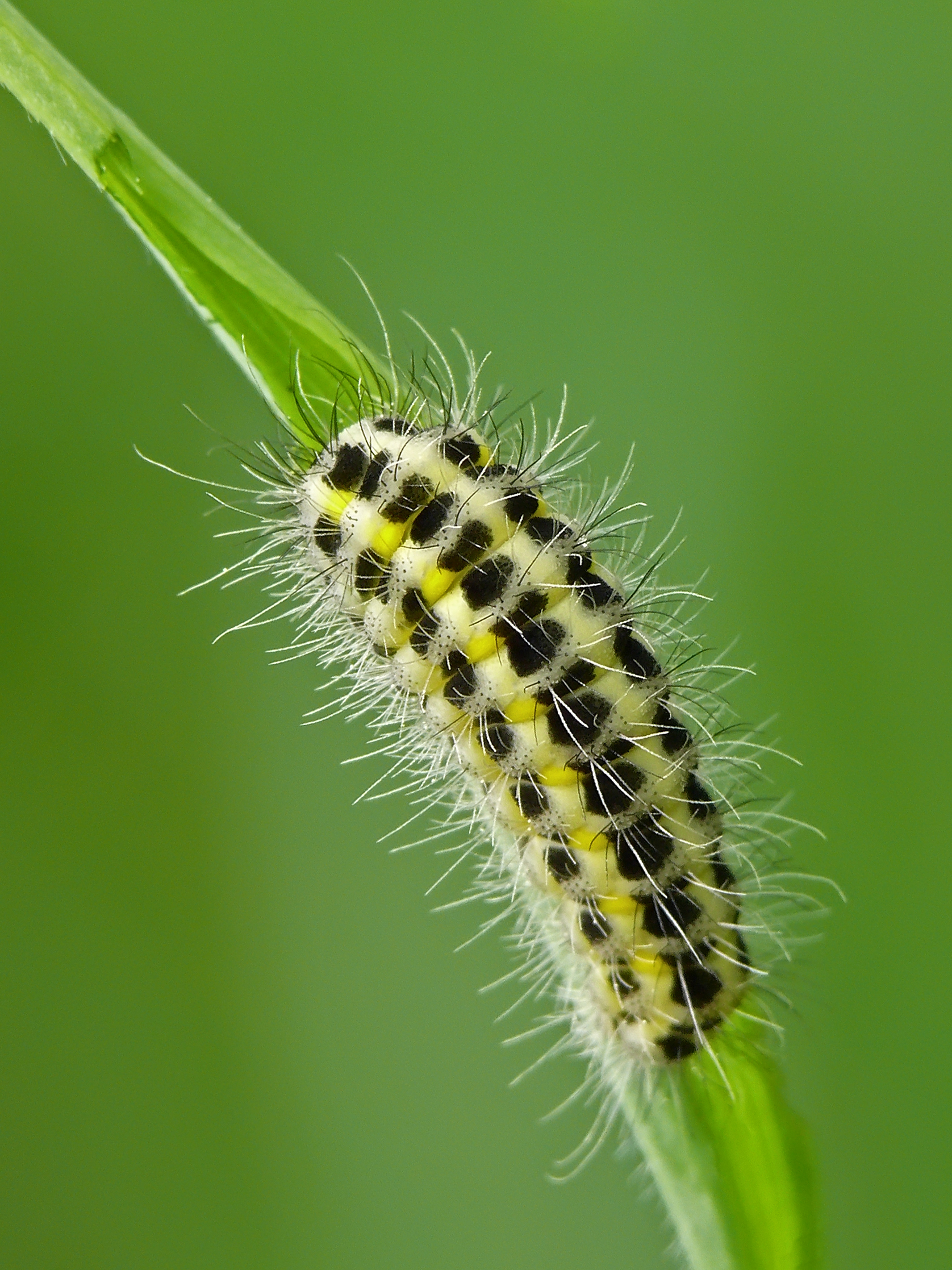
Caterpillar

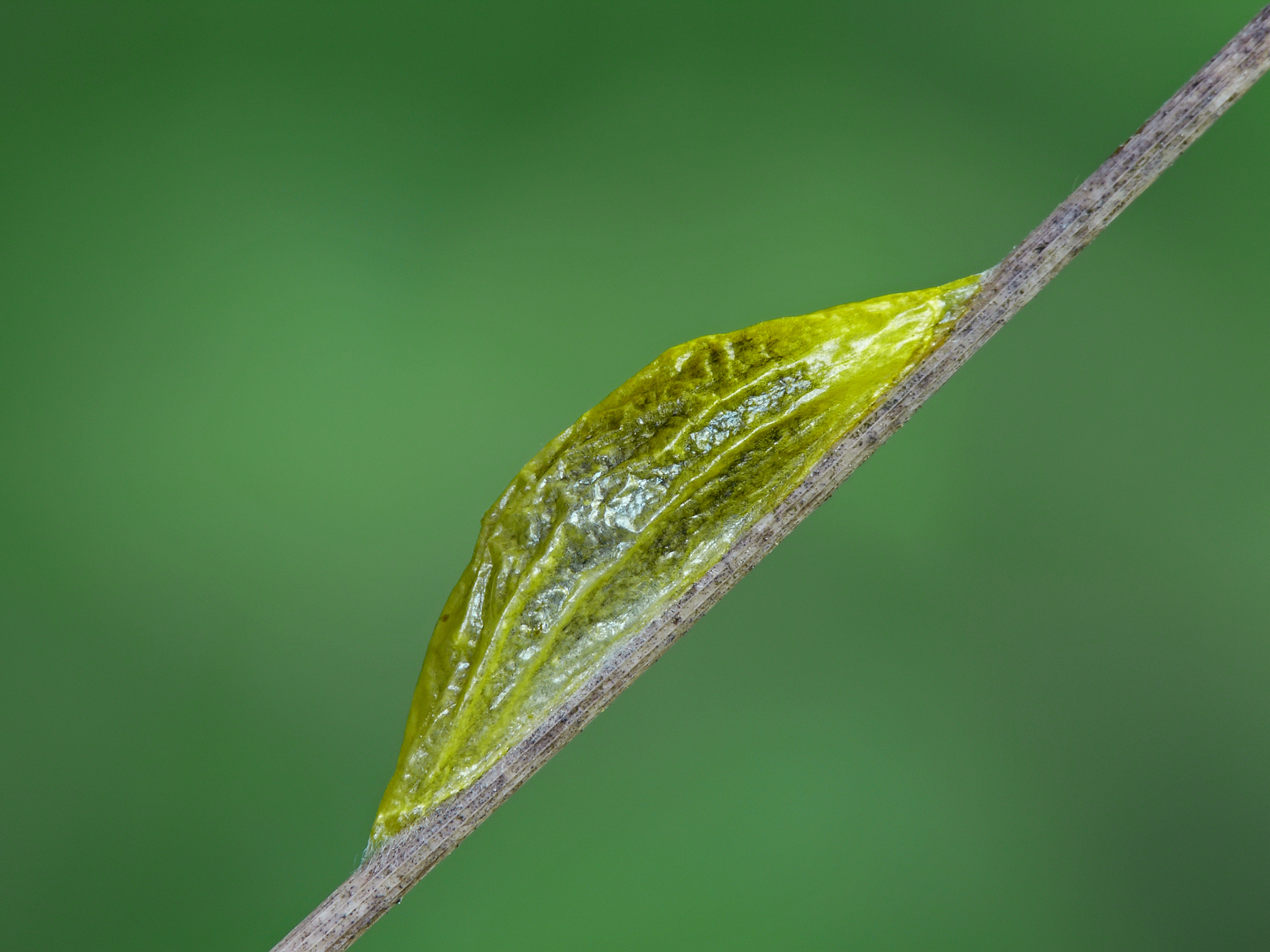
Cocoon

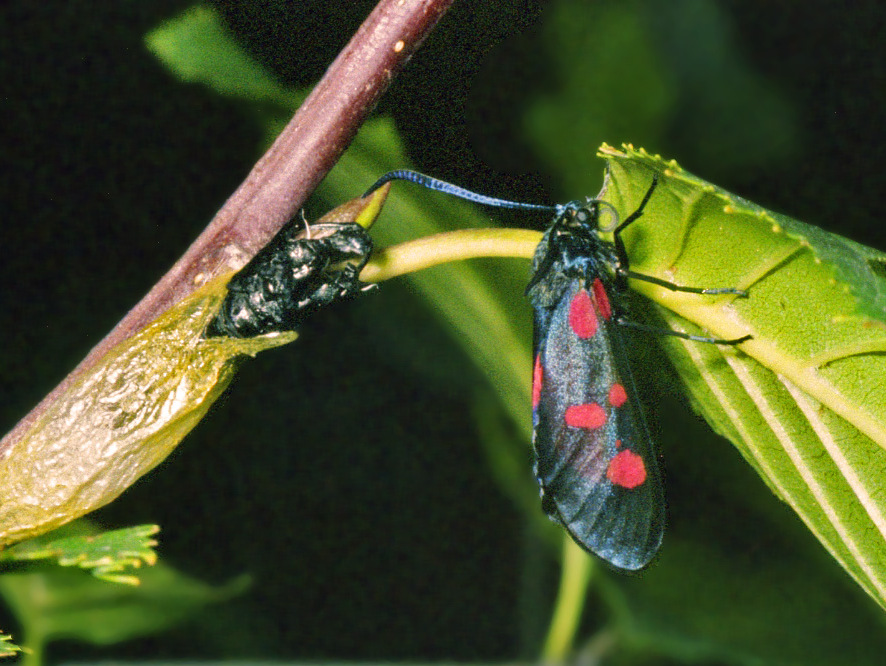
Cocoon, empty chrysalis (exuvia) and imago

== Bibliography ==
- Naumann, C. M. & Tremewan, W. G. (1999). The Western Palaearctic Zygaenidae. 1. Auflage. Apollo Books, Stenstrup
- Šašić, Martina; Nahirnić, Ana; Tarmann, Gerhard M. (2016-12-31). "Zygaenidae (Lepidoptera) in the Lepidoptera collections of the Croatian Natural History Museum". Natura Croatica: Periodicum Musei Historiae Naturalis Croatici. 25 (2): 233–248. doi:10.20302/NC.2016.25.19. eISSN 1848-7386.
- "Narrow-bordered Five-spot Burnet Zygaena lonicerae (Scheven, 1777)". BioLib. Retrieved 16 December 2019.
- Fauna Europaea
