= Quintus Pedius Poplicola =

Quintus Pedius Poplicola or Publicola (fl. first century BC) was a Roman who came from a Roman senatorial family.

== Biography ==
=== Early life ===
Publicola was the son of the noblewoman Valeria, one of the sisters to the senator Marcus Valerius Messalla Corvinus, thus was a daughter of Marcus Valerius Messalla Niger and his wife, Polla. His father may have been the Quintus Pedius who was nephew or great nephew of dictator Gaius Julius Caesar.

His cognomen Publicola or Poplicola means in Latin "friend of the people". His mother named him this cognomen in honor of her step father consul Lucius Gellius Publicola and also the name Publicola is a cognomen that appears in Valeria's paternal ancestry, the gens Valeria. Valeria has various paternal ancestors with the cognomen Publicola.

=== Career ===
Very little is known on Publicola's life. He may have been quaestor in 41 BC and served as a Roman senator. Publicola is remembered from his political career as a distinguished orator. The great Roman poet and satirist Horace, celebrates Publicola's oratory and mentions Publicola in his writings (Serm.i. 10.28) within the company of his maternal uncle Corvinus. Publicola had a son named Quintus Pedius, who was mute, and became a painter on the advice of Corvinus.

== Sources ==
- Ronald Syme, The Augustean Aristocracy, Oxford University Press, Oxford 1989, (Clarendon Paperbaks)
- William Smith, Dictionary of Greek and Roman Biography and Mythology, C. Little and J. Brown, Boston (print: London) 1870, (University of Michigan Library, Ann Arbor (Michigan) 2005), vol. 3, p. 164^{[usurped]}
- William Smith, Dictionary of Greek and Roman Biography and Mythology, C. Little and J. Brown, Boston (print: London) 1870, (University of Michigan Library, Ann Arbor (Michigan) 2005), vol. 3, p. 600^{[usurped]}
