= Paidia griseola =

Scientific classification
- Domain: Eukaryota
- Kingdom: Animalia
- Phylum: Arthropoda
- Class: Insecta
- Order: Lepidoptera
- Superfamily: Noctuoidea
- Family: Erebidae
- Subfamily: Arctiinae
- Genus: Paidia
- Species: P. griseola

Binomial name
- Paidia griseola Rothschild, 1933

Synonyms
- Paidia murina griseola Rothschild, 1933

Species of moth

Paidia griseola is a moth of the family Erebidae. It was described by Walter Rothschild in 1933. It is found in North Africa and on Sicily.
