= Paidia cinerascens =

Scientific classification
- Domain: Eukaryota
- Kingdom: Animalia
- Phylum: Arthropoda
- Class: Insecta
- Order: Lepidoptera
- Superfamily: Noctuoidea
- Family: Erebidae
- Subfamily: Arctiinae
- Genus: Paidia
- Species: P. cinerascens

Binomial name
- Paidia cinerascens (Herrich-Schäffer, 1847)

Synonyms
- Nudaria cinerascens Herrich-Schäffer, 1847

Species of moth

Paidia cinerascens is a moth of the family Erebidae. It was described by Gottlieb August Wilhelm Herrich-Schäffer in 1847. It is found in Asia Minor, Greece and on Crete.

The wingspan is 30–31 mm.

== Subspecies ==
- Paidia cinerascens cinerascens
- Paidia cinerascens palaestinensis Amsel, 1935
