= Paidia conjuncta =

Scientific classification
- Domain: Eukaryota
- Kingdom: Animalia
- Phylum: Arthropoda
- Class: Insecta
- Order: Lepidoptera
- Superfamily: Noctuoidea
- Family: Erebidae
- Subfamily: Arctiinae
- Genus: Paidia
- Species: P. conjuncta

Binomial name
- Paidia conjuncta (Staudinger, [1892])

Synonyms
- Nudaria murina var. conjuncta Staudinger, [1892]

Species of moth

Paidia conjuncta is a moth of the family Erebidae. It was described by Otto Staudinger in 1892. It is found in Armenia, Turkey, Iraq and Afghanistan.

== Subspecies ==
- Paidia conjuncta conjuncta
- Paidia conjuncta ovita de Freina, 1999
- Paidia conjuncta major Daniel, 1963
