= Paidia atargatis =

Scientific classification
- Domain: Eukaryota
- Kingdom: Animalia
- Phylum: Arthropoda
- Class: Insecta
- Order: Lepidoptera
- Superfamily: Noctuoidea
- Family: Erebidae
- Subfamily: Arctiinae
- Genus: Paidia
- Species: P. atargatis

Binomial name
- Paidia atargatis Lewandowski & Tober, 2009

Species of moth

Paidia atargatis is a moth of the family Erebidae. It was described by Stefan Lewandowski and Kerstin Tober in 2009. It is found in Jordan.
