= Theodor Gottlieb von Scheven =

German entomologist (1751–1810)

Theodosius (also Theodor or Theodorus) Gottlieb von Scheven (born 3 January 1751 on Usedom - died 23 March 1810 from typhus) was a pastor and German entomologist who specialised in Lepidoptera and Hymenoptera.

== Early life ==
Von Scheven was born on 3 January 1751 on Usedom, as third son of deacon Joachim Nikolaus von Scheven and pastor's daughter Katharina Maria von Scheven (née Thilow). He studied in Bützow and at the University of Halle.

== As pastor ==
He was a pastor, serving from 1777 to 1789 in Altwarp, then as pastor primarius in Neuwarp from 22 May 1789 until his death in 1810.

== As naturalist ==
Von Scheven described Zygaena lonicerae (as Sphinx Lonicerae) in 1777 in "Beyträge zur Naturgeschichte der Insekten. Erstes Stück" in Der Naturforscher volume 10 pages 88–101 Tab. II. In that same paper, he described three additional moths that are not currently considered valid taxa: Sphinx caffra (a junior homonym to Sphinx caffra Linnaeus, 1764), Sphinx scabiosae (synonymous to Zygaena purpuralis per Naumann & Tremewan, 1984) and Sphinx schaefferi (Zygaena ephialtes, also per Naumann & Tremewan, 1984) He also described Crabro scutellatus (as Sphex scutellatus) in 1781.

Some of his work on bagworm moths, particularly his observations on the reproductive methods of "Bombyx vestita" (now Paidia rica), was cited in volumes I (Note: in chapter XIV: Habitations of Insects) and IV (Note: in chapter XLII: Internal Anatomy and Physiology of Insects continued. Reproduction) of William Kirby and William Spence's An Introduction to Entomology, and described by Kirby as an "excellent elucidation of the history of this tribe, whose mode of generation is so singular".

=== Publications ===
He published several entomological papers, including in Der Naturforscher (twice in 1777, as well as in 1780, 1781 and 1784) and in Johann Kaspar Füssli's Neue Magazin für Liebhaber der Entomologie in 1782. Some of his published works include:

- Beytraege zur Naturgeschichte der Insekten. - Der Naturforscher, Halle/Saale 10; 11; 14; 15; 20 (1777–1784), consisting of:
  - von Scheven, Th. G. (1777). "Beyträge zur Naturgeschichte der Insekten. Erstes Stück". Der Naturforscher. 10. pages 88-101.
  - von Scheven, Th. G. (1777). "Beyträge zur Naturgeschichte der Insekten. Zweites Stueck. Beschreibung einer denen Pferden schaedlichen Raupe, welche ihren Aufenthalt in den Schilfstauden hat". Der Naturforscher. 11. pages 30-36.
  - von Scheven, Th. G. (1780). "Beytraege zur Naturgeschichte der Insekten. Drittes Stueck. Beschreibung der seltenen Raupe der Phalaena Versicolor". Der Naturforscher. 14. pages 66-76.
  - von Scheven, Th. G. (1781). "Beytraege zur Naturgeschichte der Insekten. Viertes Stueck". Der Naturforscher. 15. pages 67-86.
  - von Scheven, Th. G. (1784). "Beytraege zur Naturgeschichte der Insekten. Fuenftes Stueck. Von den Zwittern unter den Schmetterlingen nebst einigen Beytraegen zur Geschichte der Sacktraeger". Der Naturforscher. 20: 40–78.

== Notes and references ==
- Groll, E. K. (2017). Biographies of the Entomologists of the World. Online database, version 8, Senckenberg Deutsches Entomologisches Institut, Müncheberg.
- Gaedike, R.; Groll, E. K. & Taeger, A. (2012). Index Novus Litteraturae Entomologicae. Online database, version 1.0, Senckenberg Deutsches Entomologisches Institut.
