= Paidia moabitica =

Scientific classification
- Domain: Eukaryota
- Kingdom: Animalia
- Phylum: Arthropoda
- Class: Insecta
- Order: Lepidoptera
- Superfamily: Noctuoidea
- Family: Erebidae
- Subfamily: Arctiinae
- Genus: Paidia
- Species: P. moabitica

Binomial name
- Paidia moabitica de Freina, 2004

Species of moth

Paidia moabitica is a moth of the family Erebidae. It was described by Josef J. de Freina in 2004. It is found in Jordan.
