= Lex Junia Licinia =

Ancient Roman law

The lex Junia Licinia or lex Junia et Licinia was an ancient Roman law produced in 62 BC that confirmed the similar lex Caecilia Didia of 98 BC.

== See also ==
- Christmas tree bill
- List of Roman laws
- Omnibus bill
- Roman Law
