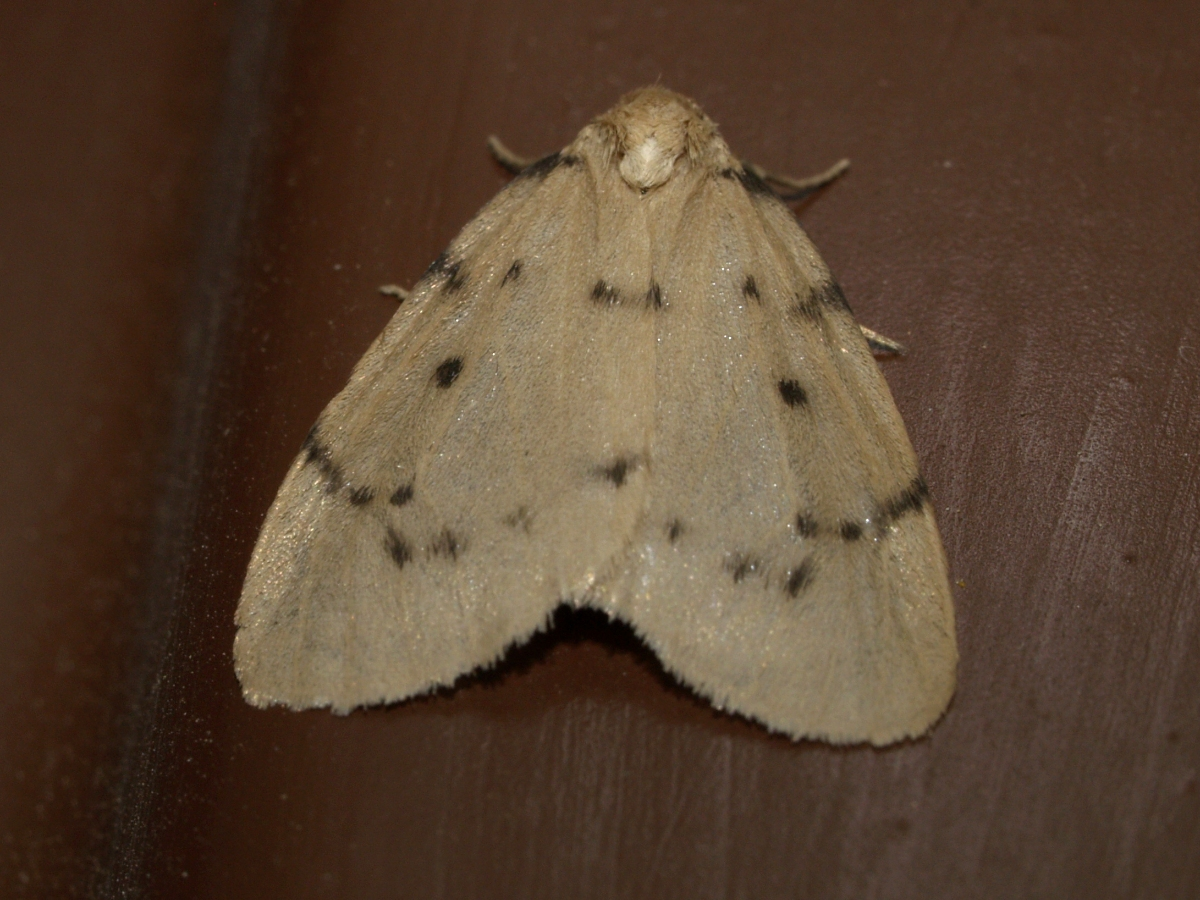

Scientific classification
- Domain: Eukaryota
- Kingdom: Animalia
- Phylum: Arthropoda
- Class: Insecta
- Order: Lepidoptera
- Superfamily: Noctuoidea
- Family: Erebidae
- Subfamily: Arctiinae
- Genus: Paidia
- Species: P. rica

Binomial name
- Paidia rica (Freyer, 1858)

Synonyms
- Bombyx rica Freyer, [1858]; Phalaena Bombyx murina Esper, 1794; Phalaena murina Hübner, 1790; Bombyx vestita Hübner, [1803] 1796; Paidia rica lusitanica Leraut, 2006

= Paidia rica =

Species of moth

Paidia rica is a moth of the family Erebidae. It was described by Christian Friedrich Freyer in 1858. It is found in southern and central Europe.

The wingspan is 28–33 mm. Adults have been recorded on wing from June to August in one generation per year.

The larvae feed on algae (including Pleurococcus species) and lichen.

== Subspecies ==
- Paidia rica rica
- Paidia rica fuliginosa Reisser, 1928
