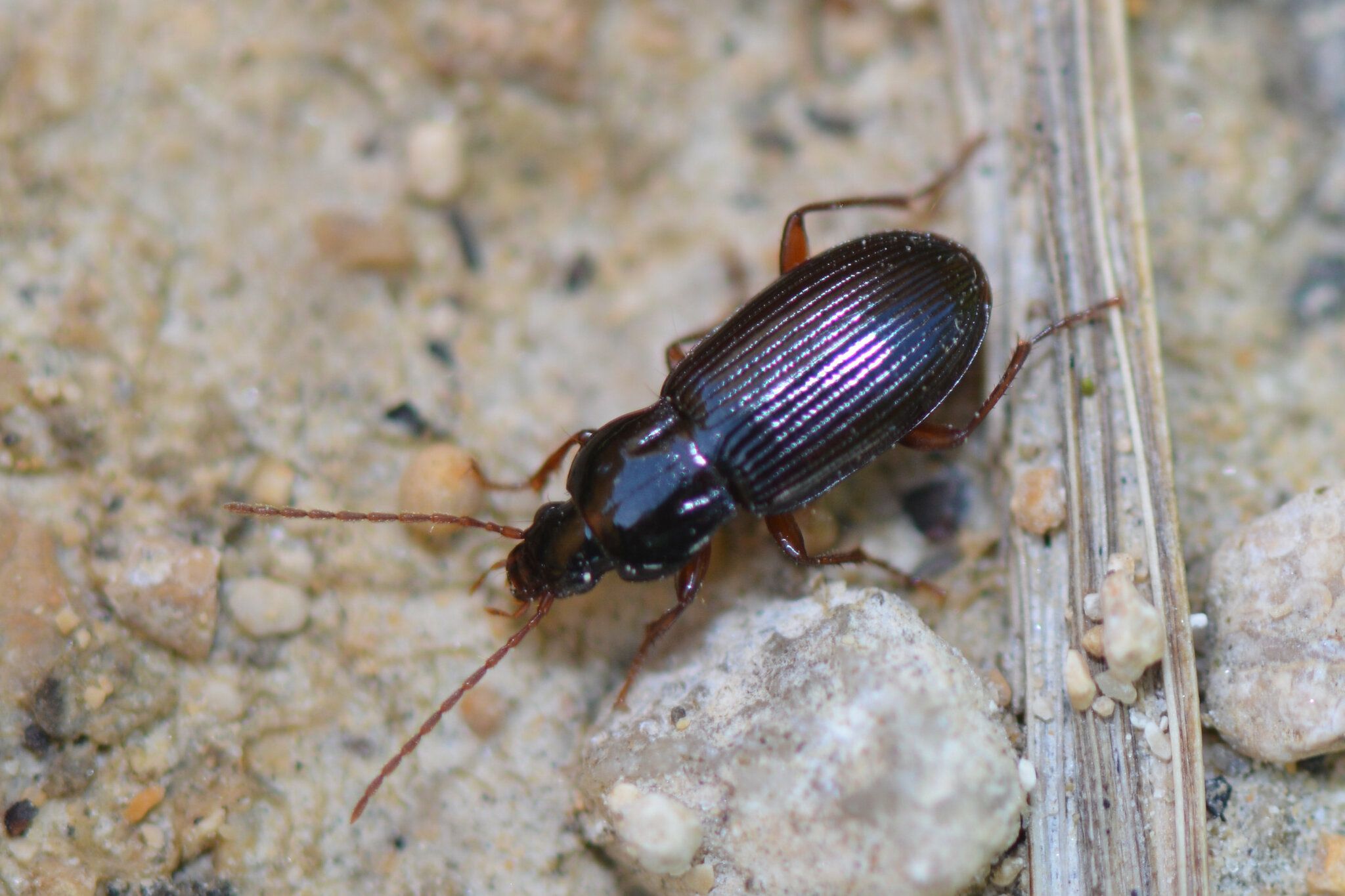
- Pedius longicollis, Switzerland

Scientific classification
- Kingdom: Animalia
- Phylum: Arthropoda
- Class: Insecta
- Order: Coleoptera
- Suborder: Adephaga
- Family: Carabidae
- Subfamily: Pterostichinae
- Tribe: Pterostichini
- Subtribe: Pterostichina
- Genus: Pedius; Motschulsky, 1850

= Pedius (beetle) =

Genus of beetles

Pedius is a genus in the ground beetle family Carabidae. There are about five described species in Pedius.

== Species ==
These five species belong to the genus Pedius:

- Pedius figuratus (Wollaston, 1864) (Canary Islands)
- Pedius ineptus (Coquerel, 1859) (Algeria, Tunisia)
- Pedius inquinatus (Sturm, 1824) (Palearctic)
- Pedius longicollis (Duftschmid, 1812) (Palearctic)
- Pedius siculus (Levrat, 1857) (Sicily, Italy)
