= Sextus Pedius =

Roman jurist

Sextus Pedius was a Roman jurist during the late first and early second centuries. He was a contemporary to the Roman Jurists Aulus Ofilius and Massurius Sabinus, and also mentioned in the writings of Pomponius.

Pedius' original ideas are only known from the quotations from the Roman jurists Julius Paulus, Ulpian, and Julian. These quotations have survived, although Pedius' original works were not directly incorporated into the Digest. He was the author of extensive commentary on the edicts or proclamations concerning the Praetorian Guard and the aediles. Two of his writings are known: the Libri ad Edictum (The Books of Edicts, of which Julius Paulus quotes the twenty-fifth), and the Libri de Stipulationibus (The Books of Agreements), concerning legal interpretation.

In a passage quoted by Julius Paulus from the Libri de Stipulationibus, Pedius states with respect to the interpretation of wills,

It is best not to scrutinize the proper signification of words, but mainly what the testator has intended to declare; in the next place, what is the opinion of those who live in each district.

In other words, the intention of a testator should prevail over the literal meaning of his words, if they should appear to be in conflict; and that ambiguity should be resolved according to the local practice or understanding in the place where the testator lived.

With respect to general interpretation, Pedius observes, in a passage quoted by Ulpian,

That when one or two things are introduced by a lex, it is a good ground for supplying the rest which tends to the same useful purpose by interpretation, or at least by jurisdiction.

Meaning that ambiguity resulting from a law failing to address a specific circumstance should be resolved in a way that is consistent with the underlying purpose of the law, either generally or by its local understanding.

The various citations to the authority of Pedius contained in the Digest are collected by Wieling.

== See also ==
- Pedia gens

== Bibliography ==
- Digesta, or Pandectae (The Digest).
- Guilielmus Grotius, De Vitae Jurisconsultorum (Lives of the Jurists), Felix Lopez, Brittenburg, (1690).
- Abraham Wieling, Jurisprudentia Restituta, seu Index Chronologicus in Totum Juris Justinianaei Corpus (Jurisprudence Restored, or a Chronological Index to the Whole Code of Justinian), Abraham van Paddenburgh, Utrecht (1739).
- Sigmund Wilhelm Zimmern, Geschichte des Römischen Privatrechts bis Justinian (History of Roman Private Law to Justinian), J. C. B. Mohr, Heidelberg (1826).
- Dictionary of Greek and Roman Biography and Mythology, William Smith, ed., Little, Brown and Company, Boston (1849), s. v. Sextus Pedius, vol. III, pp. 164, 165.
- "Encyclopedic Dictionary of Roman Law", in Transactions of the American Philosophical Society, vol. 43, part 2, p. 625 (1953), s. v. Sextus Pedius, p. 625.
