= Marcus Valerius Messalla Niger =

Roman senator

Marcus Valerius Messalla Niger was a senator of the Roman Republic.

== Career ==
He was praetor in the year of Cicero's consulship, 63 BC, and consul in 61 BC, the year in which Publius Clodius profaned the mysteries of the Bona Dea, and Gnaeus Pompeius triumphed for his several victories over the Cilician pirates, Tigranes the Great and Mithridates VI of Pontus. Messalla, as consul, took an active part in the prosecution of Clodius. Messalla was censor in 55 BC.

As an orator, Messalla was thought to be respectable. In 80 BC he was engaged in collecting evidence for the defence in the cause of Sextus Roscius of Ameria. In 62 BC he solicited Cicero to undertake the defence of his kinsman, Publius Cornelius Sulla. In 54 BC he was one of the six orators whom Marcus Aemilius Scaurus retained on his trial.

He was interrex three times, in 55, 53 and 52 BC.

== Marriage and children ==
Messalla married a woman named Polla, by whom he had two sons, Marcus Valerius Messalla Corvinus, and Marcus Valerius Messalla Rufus, as well as two daughters, both named Valeria, who married Quintus Pedius and Servius Sulpicius Rufus, the son of the consul of 51 BC (also named Servius Sulpicius Rufus), respectively.

== Footnotes ==
Political offices
Preceded by Decimus Junius Silanus and Lucius Licinius Murena	Consul of the Roman Republic with Marcus Pupius Piso Frugi Calpurnianus; 61 BC	Succeeded by Lucius Afranius and Quintus Caecilius Metellus Celer
