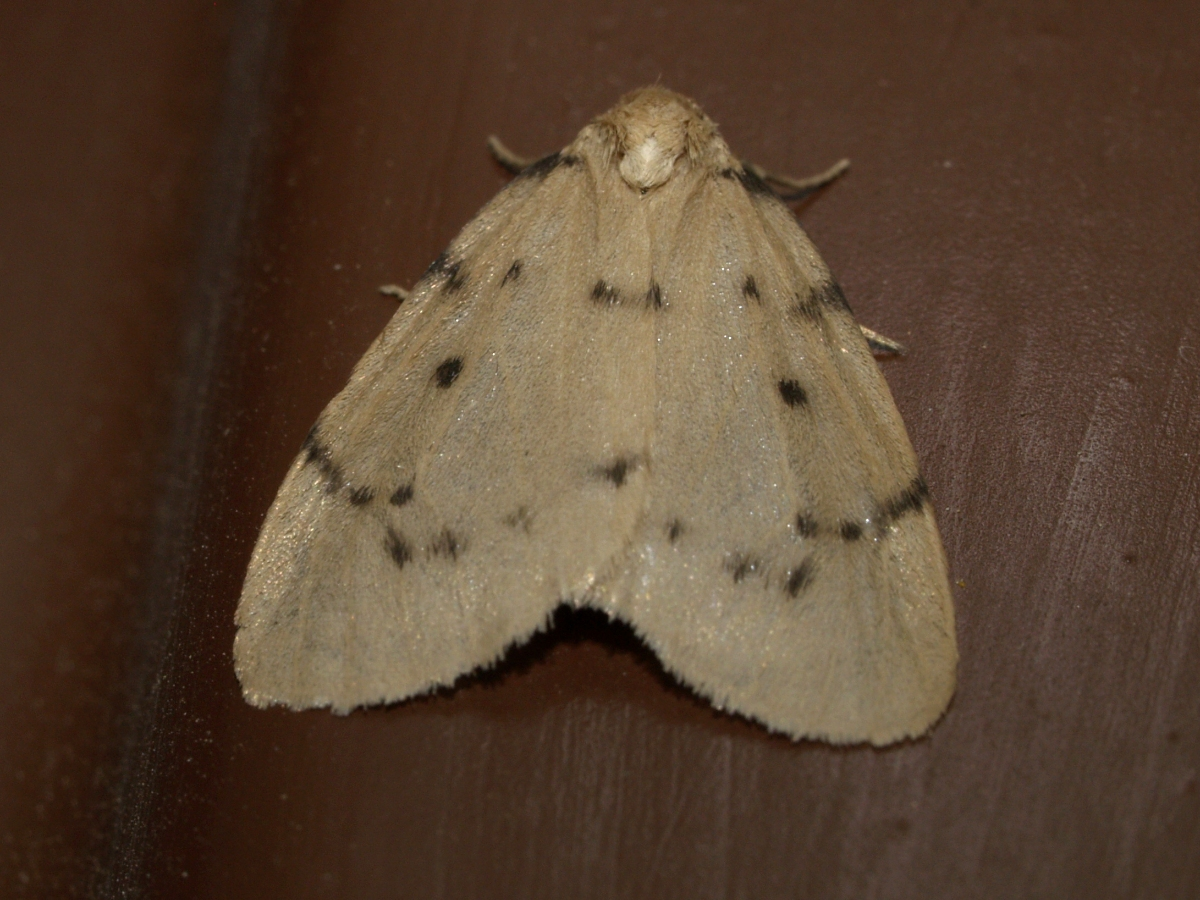
- Paidia rica

Scientific classification
- Kingdom: Animalia
- Phylum: Arthropoda
- Clade: Pancrustacea
- Class: Insecta
- Order: Lepidoptera
- Superfamily: Noctuoidea
- Family: Erebidae
- Subfamily: Arctiinae
- Subtribe: Nudariina
- Genus: Paidia; Hübner, [1819]

= Paidia =

Genus of moths

Paidia is a genus of moths in the family Erebidae erected by Jacob Hübner in 1819.

== Species ==
- Paidia albescens (Staudinger, [1892])
- Paidia atargatis Lewandowski & Tober, 2009
- Paidia cinerascens Herrich-Schäffer, 1847
- Paidia conjuncta (Staudinger, [1892])
- Paidia elegantia de Freina & Witt, 2004
- Paidia griseola Rothschild, 1933
- Paidia minoica de Freina, 2006
- Paidia moabitica de Freina, 2004
- Paidia rica Freyer, 1858
