= Marcus Valerius Messalla Corvinus =

1st-century BC Roman politician and general

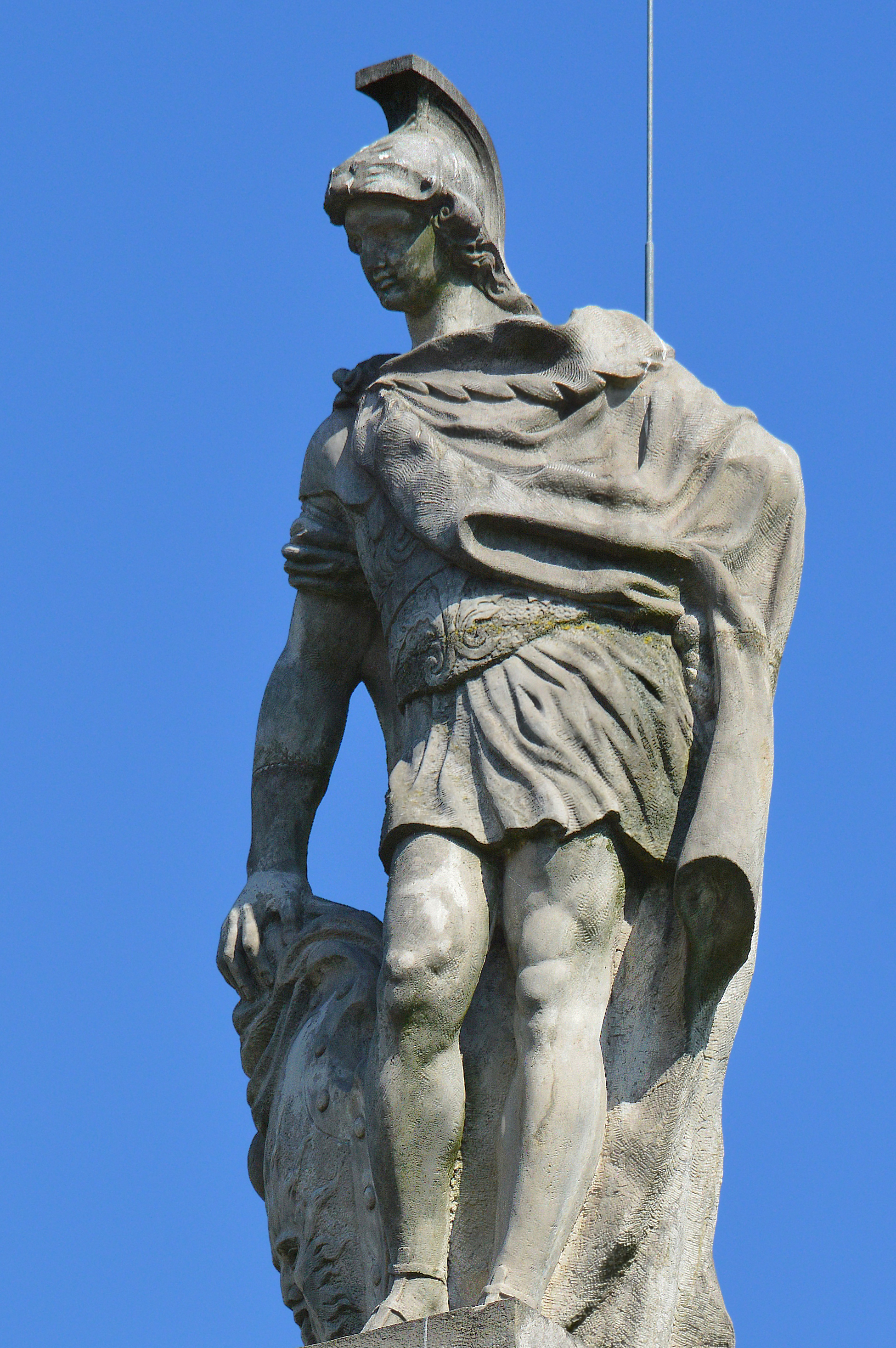
Statue of Marcus Valerius Messalla Corvinus at Krasiński Palace in Warsaw

Marcus Valerius Messalla Corvinus (64 BC – AD 8 or c. 12) was a Roman general, author, and patron of literature and art.

== Family ==
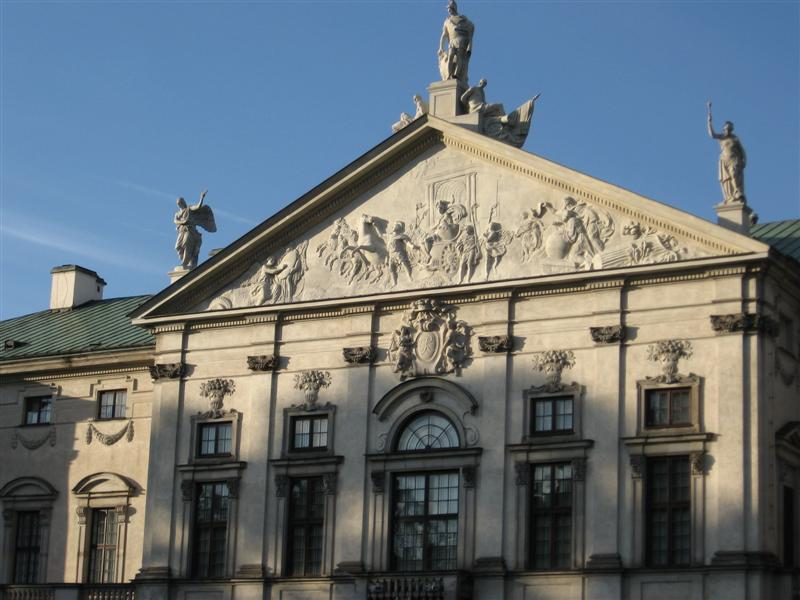
The triumph of Corvinus in the pediment of the Krasiński Palace in Warsaw

Corvinus was the son of a consul in 61 BC, Marcus Valerius Messalla Niger of the Valerii Messallae patrician family, and his wife, Palla. Some dispute his parentage and claim another descendant of Marcus Valerius Corvus to be his father. Valeria, one of his sisters, married Quintus Pedius, a maternal cousin to the Roman emperor Augustus. His great-grandnephew from this marriage was the deaf painter Quintus Pedius. Another sister, also named Valeria married Servius Sulpicius Rufus (a moneyer).

Corvinus married twice. His first wife was Calpurnia, possibly the daughter of the Roman politician Marcus Calpurnius Bibulus. Corvinus had two children with Calpurnia: a daughter, Valeria Messalina, who married the Roman senator Titus Statilius Taurus, consul in AD 11; and a son called Marcus Valerius Messalla Messallinus, consul in 3 BC. His second son was Marcus Aurelius Cotta Maximus Messalinus, consul in AD 20, who is believed to have been born to a second unknown wife on the basis of the 22-year gap between the consulship of the elder son and the consulship of the second son. The writings of the poet Ovid (Ex Ponto XVI.1-52) reveal that the second wife of Corvinus was a woman called Aurelia Cotta. Another fact supporting the theory that Aurelia Cotta was the mother of Marcus Aurelius Cotta Maximus Messalinus is that he was later adopted into the Aurelii Cottae.

== Life ==
Corvinus was educated partly at Athens, together with Horace and the younger Cicero. In early life he became attached to republican principles, which he never abandoned, although in later life he avoided offending Caesar Augustus by not mentioning them too openly.

In 43 BC he was proscribed, but managed to escape to the camp of Brutus and Cassius. After the Battle of Philippi in 42 BC, he went over to Antony, but subsequently transferred his support to Octavian. In 31 BC, Corvinus was appointed consul in place of Antony and took part in the Battle of Actium. He subsequently held commands in the East and suppressed the revolt in Gallia Aquitania; for this latter feat he celebrated a triumph in 27 BC.

Corvinus restored the road between Tusculum and Alba, and many handsome buildings were due to his initiative. He moved that the title of pater patriae should be bestowed upon Augustus. Yet he also resigned from the post of Prefect of the city in 25 BC after six days of holding this office because it conflicted with his ideas of constitutionalism. It may have been on this occasion that he uttered the phrase "I am ashamed of my power".

== Patronage and writings ==
His influence on literature, which he encouraged after the manner of Gaius Maecenas, was considerable, and the group of literary personalities whom he gathered around him—including Tibullus, Lygdamus (probably a pseudonym) and the poetess Sulpicia—has been called "the Messalla circle". With Horace and Tibullus he was on intimate terms, and Ovid expresses his gratitude to him as the first to notice and encourage his work. Two panegyrics by unknown authors (one, the Panegyricus Messallae, printed among the poems of Tibullus as III.7; the other included as no. 9 in the Catalepton, a collection of small poems attributed to Virgil) indicate the esteem in which he was held.

Corvinus was himself the author of various works, all of which are lost. They included memoirs of the civil wars after the death of Caesar, used by Suetonius and Plutarch; bucolic poems in Greek; translations of Greek speeches; occasional satirical and erotic verses; and essays on the minutiae of grammar. As an orator, he followed Cicero instead of the Atticizing school, but his style was affected and artificial. Later critics considered him superior to Cicero, and Tiberius adopted him as a model. Late in life he wrote a work on the great Roman families, wrongly identified with an extant poem De progenie Augusti Caesaris which bears the name of Corvinus, but in fact is a 15th-century production.

== Places associated with Corvinus ==
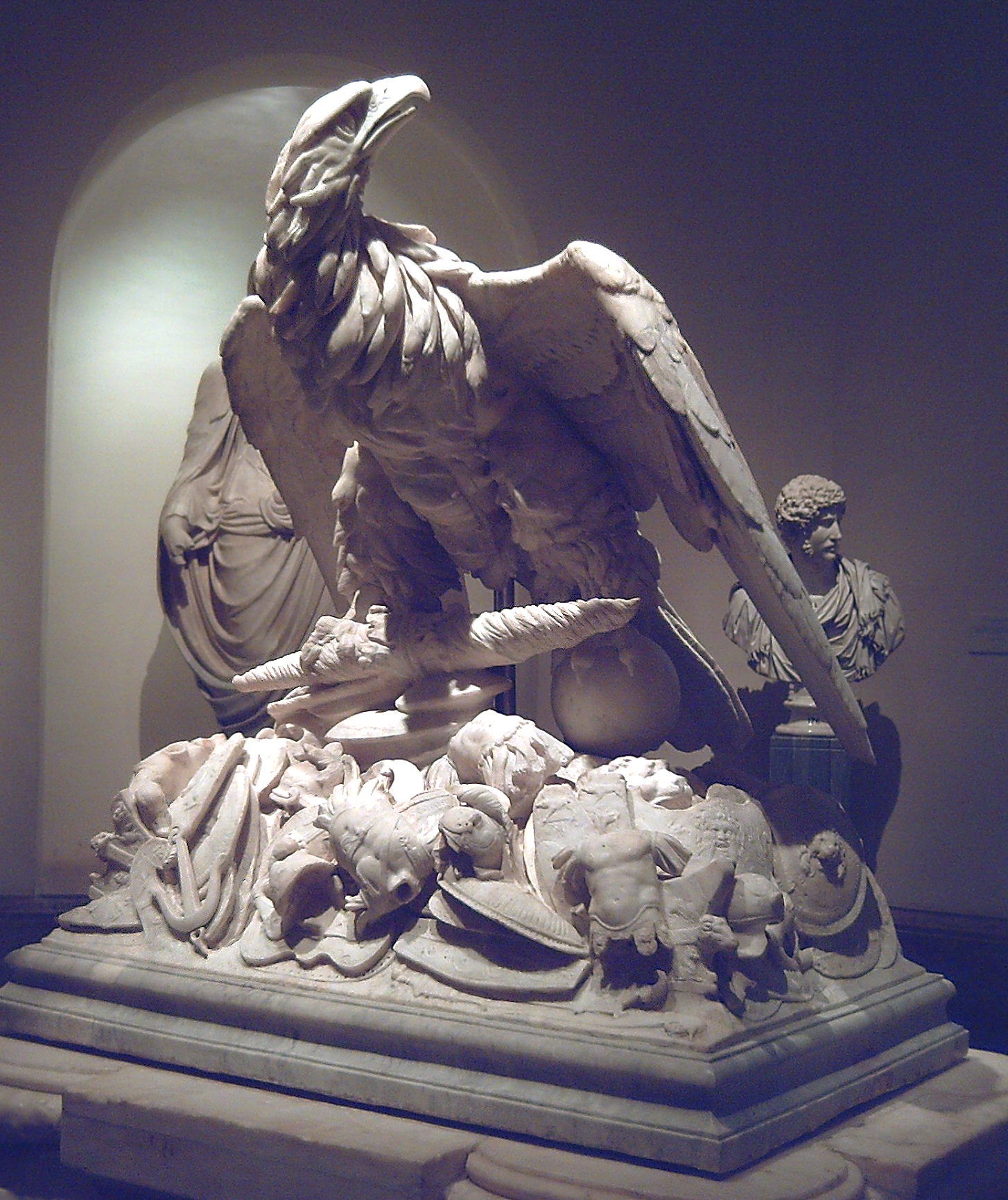
The so-called Apotheosis of Claudius, the top part of an Augustan-era funerary monument that may once have contained Corvinus' funerary urn. Found in a country villa at Marino once owned by C. Valerius Paulinus, a descendant of Corvinus, it is now in the Museo del Prado in Madrid.

Corvinus had a house on the Palatine Hill in Rome that used to belong to Mark Antony before Augustus presented it to Corvinus and Marcus Vipsanius Agrippa. An inscription (CIL VI, 29789 = ILS 5990) records Corvinus as the owner of the famed Gardens of Lucullus (Horti Luculliani) located on the Pincian Hill where the Villa Borghese gardens are today.

The Casale Rotondo, a cylindrical tomb near the sixth milestone on the Appian Way, is often identified as being the tomb of Corvinus, but this is debatable. Corvinus is also recorded in an inscription as being one of the three friends of Gaius Cestius responsible for erecting statues that once stood at the site of the famous Pyramid of Cestius which is located close to the Porta San Paolo in Rome.

In 2012, a luxurious villa of Corvinus was found on the via dei Laghi near Ciampino. The finds included seven colossal statues of Niobids that had toppled into the piscina apparently due to an earthquake.

In 2014 another luxurious villa of Corvinus on the island of Elba was identified as his. It was burnt down in the 1st c. AD. Since its original excavation in the 1960s it was believed to belong to his family since he was a patron of Ovid who wrote of his visit to Corvinus's son on Elba before his exile on the Black Sea. Recent excavations below the collapsed building revealed five dolia for wine which were stamped with the Latin inscription "Hermia Va(leri) (M)arci s(ervus)fecit" (made by Hermias, slave of Marcus Valerius).

== Legendary ancestor of Hungarian royalty ==
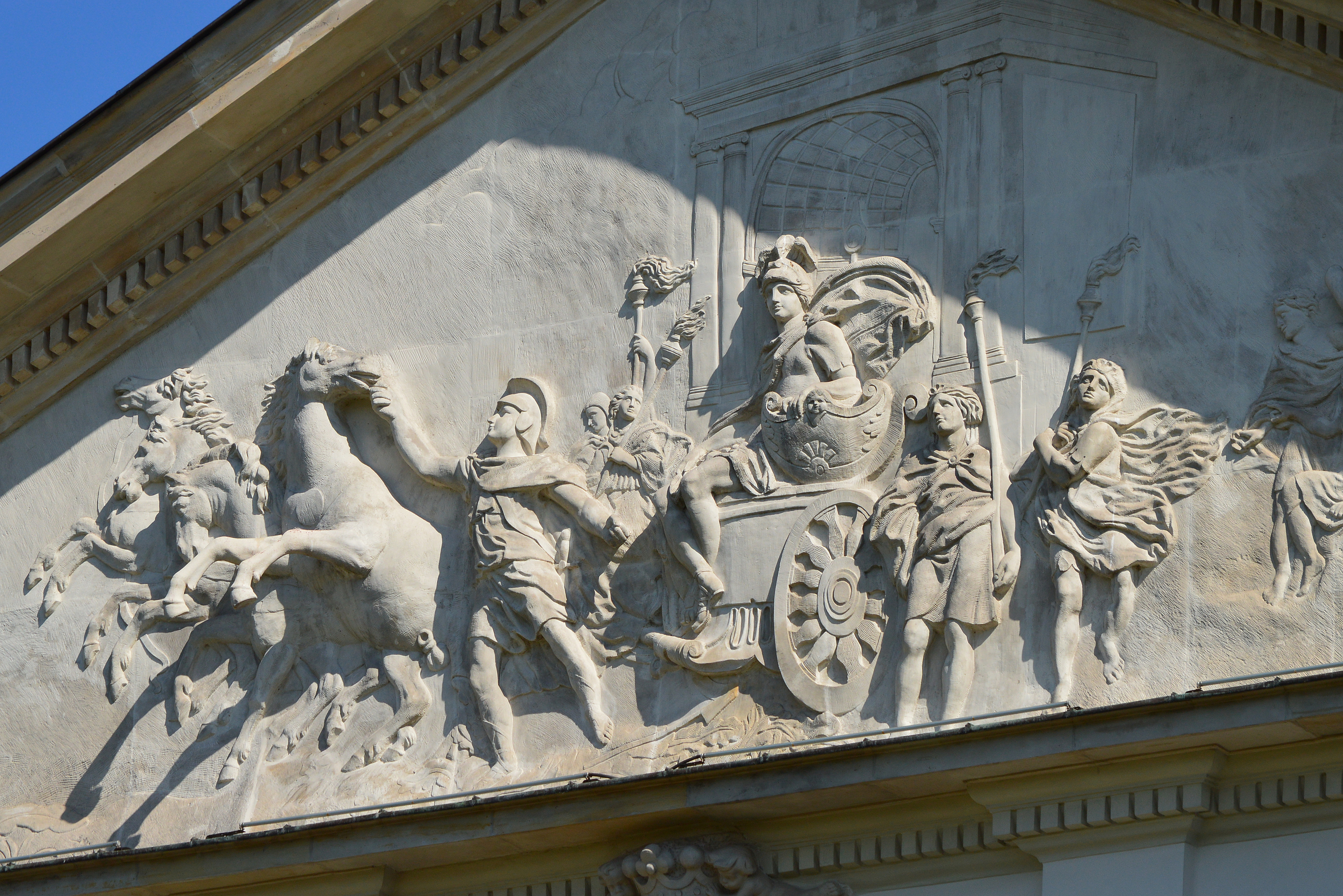
The triumph of Marcus Valerius Corvinus in the pediment of the Krasiński Palace in Warsaw

The Wallachian-Hungarian family of Corvin, which came to prominence with Janos Hunyadi and his son, Matthias Corvinus Hunyadi, King of Hungary and Bohemia, claimed to be descended from Corvinus. This was based on the assertion that he became a big landowner on the Pannonian-Dacian frontiers, the future Hungary and part of Romania, that his descendants continued to live there for the following 1400 years, and that the Hunyadis were his ultimate descendants – for which there is scant if any historical evidence. The connection seems to have been made by Matthias' biographer, the Italian Antonio Bonfini, who was well-versed with the classical Latin authors.

Bonfini also provided the Hunyadis with the epithet Corvinus. This was supposedly due to a case in which the tribune, Marcus Valerius Corvus in 349 BC, while on the battlefield, accepted a challenge to single combat issued to the Romans by a barbarian warrior of great size and strength. Suddenly, a raven flew from a trunk, perched upon his helmet, and began to attack his foe's eyes with its beak so fiercely that the barbarian was blinded and the Roman beat him easily. In memory of this event, Valerius' agnomen Corvinus (from Corvus, "Raven") was interpreted as derived from this event. The Hunyadis called themselves "Corvinus" and had their coins minted displaying a "raven with a ring". This was later taken up in the coat of arms of Polish aristocratic families connected with the Hunyadis, and also led to Marcus Valerius Messalla Corvinus' triumph over the Aquitanians (27 BC) being commemorated in the pediment of the Krasiński Palace in Warsaw.

== See also ==
- Korwin coat of arms
- Ślepowron coat of arms
- Domina (TV series)

Political offices
Preceded by Gnaeus Domitius Ahenobarbus; Gaius Sosius	Roman consul 31 BC with Octavian III	Succeeded by Marcus Titius (suffect)
