= Quintus Pedius (consul) =

Nephew or grandnephew of Julius Caesar

- Born: c. 92 BC
- Died: 43 BC
- Office: Legate (58–56 BC, under Caesar); Praetor (48 BC); Consul (43 BC)
- Spouse: Valeria
- Children: Quintus Pedius Poplicola
- Relatives: Julius Caesar
- Awards: Triumph (45 BC)

Quintus Pedius (c. 92 BC – late 43 BC) was a Roman politician and general who lived during the late Republic. For most of his career, he served as a military officer under his uncle Julius Caesar. Serving with Caesar during the civil war, he was elected praetor in 48 BC and was given a triumph for victories over the Pompeians during the civil war's second Spanish campaign.

After Caesar's death, he joined with Caesar's heir Octavian and, with him, assumed suffect consulships in 43 BC in place of the ordinary consuls who had fallen in battle. He promulgated the lex Pedia, which established courts in which Caesar's killers and allies thereof were convicted in absentia. He died shortly after the start of the Second Triumvirate's proscriptions.

== Early life ==
He was the son of his homonymous father and his wife, Julia Major. This Julia was one of the dictator Julius Caesar's sisters, making this Pedius one of Caesar's nephews.

Pedius served under Julius Caesar during the Gallic Wars starting in 57 BC. Broughton's Magistrates of the Roman Republic places his term in Gaul under Caesar from 58–56 BC. In 55 BC, he lost an election for the office of aedile.

During Caesar's civil war, Pedius joined with Caesar. In 48 BC, Pedius assumed a praetorship. In that same year, he commanded a legion and successfully quelled an anti-Caesarean uprising at Compsa, resulting in the deaths of both Marcus Caelius Rufus and Titus Annius Milo, who had been leading the ill-fated revolt. From 46 to 45 BC, Pedius served as a Caesarian legate in Spain. Pedius claimed victory against Sextus Pompey and returned to Rome with Caesar. He was then honoured with a triumph as pro consule ex Hispania; the honour was granted illegally, according to Dio, as he was merely one of Caesar's legates.

Suetonius and Appian record that after Caesar's assassination in March 44 BC, Pedius was named one of Caesar's heirs in his will. With his cousin Lucius Pinarius, he was to receive a quarter of Caesar's estate, but he renounced the inheritance in favor of Caesar's main heir, Pedius' cousin Octavian (the future emperor Augustus).

== Consulship ==
After the ordinary consuls of that year, Gaius Vibius Pansa Caetronianus and Aulus Hirtius, were both killed while fighting against Antony during the battle of Mutina, Octavian – the only surviving commander of senatorial forces – marched on the city at the head of his army to demand his elevation as consul. With Pedius as Octavian's colleague, on 19 August 43 BC, the two assumed office as suffect consuls after an irregularly convoked election.

=== Lex Pedia ===
Their first action was to confirm Octavian's adoption as Caesar's heir; then, at Octavian's suggestion, Pedius promulgated the lex Pedia, which established courts to prosecute Caesar's killers, likely on charges of vis (public violence). This overruled a previous senatus consultum which protected the tyrannicides from prosecution. Consequently, Caesar's killers – along with co-conspirators and others who had little to do with the crime – were then convicted in absentia in a single day of proceedings. They were formally "debarred from fire and water and their property [was] confiscated".

After the passage of the lex Pedia, he also brought legislation to rescind the declaration of Mark Antony and Marcus Aemilius Lepidus as public enemies. The early and rushed passage of the lex Pedia was likely related to Octavian's attempts to assume for himself leadership of the Caesarian faction by displaying his bona fides in avenging the death of Caesar; the lex Pedia was likely unrelated to the following proscriptions.

=== Death ===
Pedius was left in charge of Rome, while Octavian left for Northern Italy to join Antony and Lepidus in forming the Second Triumvirate.

Soon after news reached Rome of the new political alliance and of the lists of people whom the triumvirs had marked for death, Pedius died.

== Personal life ==
Pedius married a Roman noblewoman called Valeria, a sister of Marcus Valerius Messalla Corvinus and thus a daughter of Marcus Valerius Messalla Niger and his wife, Polla. Pedius and Valeria had at least one child, a son named Quintus Pedius Publicola. Publicola became a Roman senator and distinguished himself with his oratory. Pliny the Elder in his Naturalis Historia mentions that Quintus Pedius had a grandson, also named Quintus Pedius, who was mute and supposedly deaf; this grandson may be the earliest example of a deaf individual named in written history.

== Sources ==
- Broughton, Thomas Robert Shannon (1952). The magistrates of the Roman republic. Vol. 2. New York: American Philological Association.
- Hart, Addison. "Dreams of Empire: The Fall of the Roman Republic". Military History Online. Archived from the original on March 4, 2016.
- Keaveney, Arthur; Madden, John (1988). "Lucius Pinarius, Quintus Pedius: their Degrees of Kinship with Julius Caesar". Latomus. 47 (2): 354–357. ISSN 0023-8856. JSTOR 41540884.
- Smith, William, ed. (1867). "Pedius 1". Dictionary of Greek and Roman Biography and Mythology. Vol. 3. Boston: Little, Brown, and Company. p. 164.
- Suetonius (1913) [1st century AD]. "Life of Julius Caesar". Lives of the Twelve Caesars. Loeb Classical Library. Translated by Rolfe, JC. Harvard University Press – via LacusCurtius.
- Syme, Ronald (1989) [1986]. The Augustan aristocracy. Clarendon Press. ISBN 978-0-19-814731-2.
- Welch, Kathryn (2014). "The lex Pedia of 43 BCE and its aftermath". Hermathena (196/197): 137–162. ISSN 0018-0750. JSTOR 26740133.
- Zmeskal, Klaus (2009). Adfinitas (in German). Vol. 1. Passau.

Preceded by Aulus Hirtius and Gaius Vibius Pansa Caetronianus	Suffect consul of the Roman Republic; Gaius Julius Caesar Octavianus; 43 BC	Succeeded by Marcus Aemilius Lepidus and Lucius Munatius Plancus
