= Quintus Pedius (painter) =

Ancient Roman painter

Quintus Pedius (died about 13) was a Roman painter and the first deaf person in recorded history known by name. (Note: Pliny the Elder, the only ancient source for the life of Pedius, does not actually state that Pedius was deaf, but rather that he was mute. That he was deaf seems to be a modern interpretation.) He is the first recorded deaf painter and his education is the first recorded education of a deaf child. All that is known about him today is contained in a single passage of the Natural History by the Roman author Pliny the Elder.

Pedius was the son of Roman Senator and orator Quintus Pedius Publicola. Pedius' paternal grandfather was the consul Quintus Pedius and his paternal grandmother was Valeria, a sister of Roman Senator and orator Marcus Valerius Messalla Corvinus. His paternal grandfather Pedius and Roman emperor Augustus were maternal second cousins (or first cousins once removed if Pedius was the son of Julia Major instead). Pedius was born deaf. On the advice of his paternal great-uncle Corvinus, and with permission from Augustus, Pedius was taught to paint. The boy turned out to be a talented painter, but died in his youth.

== Sources ==
- Oxford Handbook of Deaf Studies, Language, and Education
- Dictionary of Greek and Roman Biography
