= Publius Vatinius =

Roman statesman

- Born: c. 95 BC; Rieti (possibly)
- Died: c. 41 BC
- Office: Legate (Further Spain) (62 BC); Plebeian tribune (59 BC); Legate (Gaul) (58–56 BC); Praetor (55 BC); Legate (under Caesar) (51–47 BC); Consul (47 BC); Proconsul (Illyricum) (45–42 BC)
- Spouses: Antonia; Cornelia (possibly); Pompeia (m. c. 54 BC)

Publius Vatinius was a Roman politician during the last decades of the Republic. He served as a Caesarian-allied plebeian tribune in the year 59 – he was the tribune that proposed the law giving Caesar his Gallic command – and later fought on that side of the civil war. Caesar made him consul in 47 BC; he later fought in Illyricum for the Caesarians and celebrated a triumph for his victories there in 42 BC.

== Biography ==
Many details about Vatinius' life emerge from Cicero's claims, which "must be taken with a grain of salt and understood as a piece of rhetorical invective, in which an orator would do anything to discredit his opponent, including the use of half-truths and exaggerations".

=== Early political life ===
Vatinius did not appear to have had consular ancestors, making him a novus homo. His first recorded position was a quaestorship in 63 BC, the same year Marcus Tullius Cicero was consul. He was elected last to the quaestorship. Cicero claims he was allotted the provincia aquaria, which may have dealt with the city's water supply or otherwise, and less likely, handled matters in Ostia. However, the specifics of his quaestorian assignment are unclear, he may have only been assigned to Puteoli.

Cicero sent him that year to Puteoli to prevent the gold and silver from being carried away from the city. His extortions, however, were so oppressive that the inhabitants were obliged to complain of his conduct; Pina Polo and Díaz Fernández, in The Quaestorship in the Roman Republic, however, doubt the Ciceronean story, saying "the text implies Vatinius carried out his mission with extraordinary zeal and that his diligence led some merchants to complain".

He served the next year, 62 BC, as a lieutenant under Gaius Cosconius, who was then proconsul in Hispania Ulterior.

=== In the service of Caesar ===
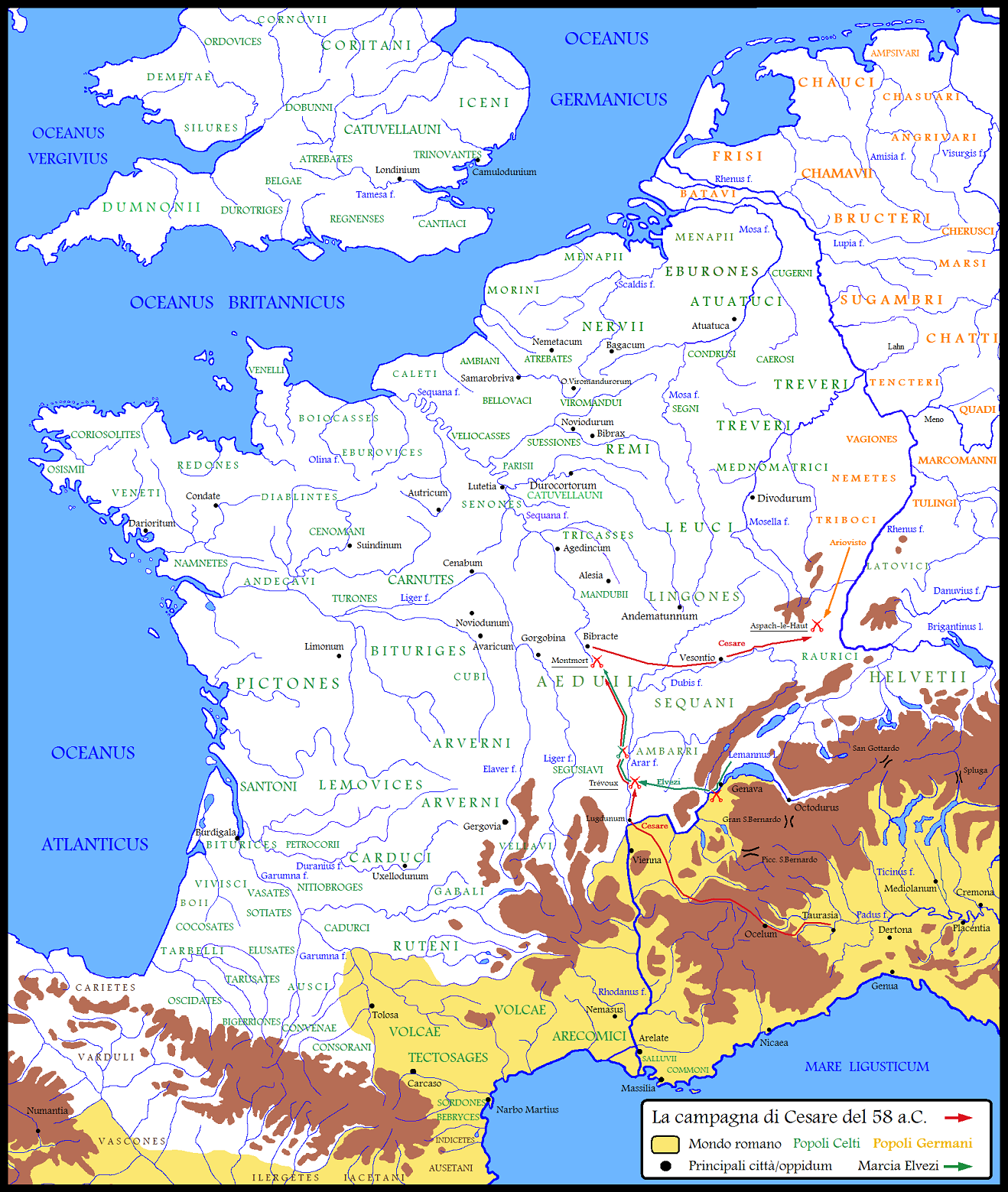
Gaul in the first year of the Gallic Wars (58 BC).

In 59 BC, he was tribune of the plebs and allied himself to Gaius Julius Caesar, who was then consul along with Marcus Calpurnius Bibulus. After the senate assigned the incoming consuls the post-consular tasks of defending Italy from a resurgent Gallic threat, Vatinius brought forward legislation, including the lex Vatinia that assigned Caesar the provinces of Cisalpine Gaul and IIlyricum for five years. The senate, at the instigation of Pompey and Piso, later added the province of Transalpine Gaul to Caesar's provincial assignments. In general, these military assignments had to have been justified by the then-"troubled state of Transalpine Gaul [and] invasion of Noricum by the Boii".

Vatinius also passed legislation to regulate challenges against jurymen, to set limits of the size of staffs for provincial governors, to establish a colony at Novum Comum, and to regulate diplomacy with foreign kings. Cicero, in an invective against Vatinius, connected Vatinius with the incident during his tribunate where consul Bibulus was pushed to the floor of the forum and assaulted with a bucket of manure when he tried to intercede against a speech his co-consul Caesar was making.

During his tribunate, Vatinius also brought forward the informer Lucius Vettius. Vettius, "an informer of little repute", told of a supposed group of nobles conspiring to murder Pompey. Vettius also named a number of men – including Bibulus (serving as consul), "the older and younger Curiones, two Lentuli, Aemilius Paullus, and M. Brutus" – as members of the plot. Vettius was then jailed, and when produced the next day by Caesar and Vatinius, changed his story to drop any mention of Brutus while also naming "Lucullus, Domitius Ahenobarbus, C. Fannius, C. Piso, [and] M. Laterensis, [with] some sly hints about Cicero"; soon afterwards, Vettius was found dead in prison. While the object of the Vettius affair is not clear, "most commentators" believe that Caesar and Vatinius "suborned [Vettius] to fabricate the plot in order to ruin young Curio and other aristocrats who were giving the consul [Caesar] difficulty", though it is also possible that Pompey or his partisans had concocted the scheme. For his part, Vatinius questioned Vettius before the people and promised to bring legislation to establish a special inquiry into the accusations, but this plan was probably dropped after Vettius' death.

Vatinius was likely put up for election to the augurate, but the alliance between Caesar, Pompey, and Crassus was unable to win him election (or election of any other allies that year). By autumn 59 BC, it seems, the alliance of the three men had reached their political apex, with Vatinius "utterly fail[ing] to rally their popular audience or mobilis[ing] demonstrations against their opponents".

After his tribunate, Vatinius left Rome with Caesar to serve as a legate in Gaul, serving there for a few years, possibly as early as 58, but definitely from 57 to 56 BC. He also was prosecuted, possibly by Gaius Licinius Macer Calvus, in the first half of 58; the trial was stopped, however, by the intercession of the people's tribune Publius Clodius Pulcher and violent disorder. It seems Vatinius failed to be elected to the aedileship in 57 BC, which was "all the more troubling" when the ex-tribunes who had opposed Caesar in his tribunician cohort were successfully returned as praetors.

Vatinius's animosity towards Cicero continued, and he appeared as a witness against Publius Sestius in 56 BC, whom Cicero was defending. Cicero spoke on behalf of Sestius with a scathing speech against the character of Vatinius called in P. Vatinium testem interrogatio. Among other things, Cicero alleged that Vatinius had defied auspices, occupied temples with armed men, violently attacked the consul, attacked other magistrates when they tried to interpose their vetoes, profaned religious ceremonies, and was responsible for other unscrupulous actions. Some of these claims are "obviously rhetorical": Vatinius "respected the intercession made by some of his fellow tribunes".

=== Praetorship ===
After a fair amount of turmoil, Gnaeus Pompeius Magnus and Marcus Licinius Crassus were elected to the consulship for 55 BC. The elections that year were late and held in the same year that the winners would serve. Marcus Porcius Cato and Vatinius were both candidates for the praetorship; Pompey and Crassus successfully defeated Cato "by means of bribery, obstruction, and violence", securing election for Vatinius.

After his year as praetor, in August 54 BC, Vatinius was prosecuted for bribery in his campaign for the praetorship by Gaius Licinius Macer Calvus. Calvus had previously accused Vatinius on the same charges earlier in the year. Calvus' speech in this prosecution was noted for its eloquence; Vatinius even interrupted Calvus protesting, "I ask you, judges, is it right that I should be convicted because that man is articulate?". Cicero, who was by this time "obedient to Caesar, Pompey, and Crassus", successfully defended Vatinius against these bribery charges.

=== Service during the civil wars ===
Vatinius returned to Gaul in 51 BC where he was again a legate for Julius Caesar. He stayed with Caesar during the start of the civil war and continued as one of his lieutenants until 47. While in Greece during the war, he attempted to parley for peace with Pompey in Epirus, which was unsuccessful; he later defended Brundisium from a naval attack by Decimus Laelius and, during his stay there, aided Cicero when he returned to Italy in the aftermath of the Pompeian defeat at Pharsalus.

Early in 47 BC, Vatinius commanded troops in Illyricum and defeated Marcus Octavius at the Battle of Tauris, recovering the province for the Caesarians. He was also elected that year as augur, succeeding Appius Claudius Pulcher. In return for his successes, Vatinius was rewarded with a three-month ordinary consulship – elections for that year were delayed and held in September – late in 47 BC. After his short consulship, he took up a proconsular command in Illyricum from 45 to 43 BC. He was sent to Illyricum with three legions to reclaim the province and was successful, being acclaimed imperator and receiving supplicatio (days of thanksgiving) for his success.

After the death of Caesar on 15 March 44 BC, Vatinius attempted to remain in Illyricum but was forced, either late in 44 or early in 43 BC, to yield his troops and territory to Marcus Junius Brutus. A letter to this effect arrived in Rome in early or mid February 43 BC.

Vatinius' whereabouts and activities in 43 BC are undocumented, but the next year, he celebrated a triumph on 31 July 42 BC over Illyricum. In later life, he reconciled with Cicero. He probably died some time shortly after his triumph.

== Personal life ==
Vatinius married two or three times. The first marriage was to a woman named Antonia; she was the daughter of the Marcus Antonius Creticus who was praetor in 67 and the Julia who was the sister of the Lucius Julius Caesar who was consul in 64 BC. A second wife may be attested, if an inscription with the name Vatienus as the husband of a certain Cornelia is this Vatinius. Variant spellings were common in ancient Rome: Klaus Zmeskal's Adfinitas assimilates the Vatineus with this Vatinius and believes she was the daughter of Lucius Cornelius Scipio Asiagenus Aemilianus. However, Lily Ross Taylor's Voting Districts believes the two men were distinct. A final wife was a certain Pompeia married around 56 BC; she was possibly one of Pompey's sisters, though Caesar's ex-wife has also been proposed.

His tribal assignment was that of Sergia.

== Legacy ==
The tribe Vatinia in the Roman colony at Corinth was probably named in his honour.

== See also ==
- List of Roman consuls

== Bibliography ==
=== Modern sources ===
- Alexander, Michael Charles (1990). Trials in the late Roman Republic, 149 BC to 50 BC. Toronto: University of Toronto Press. ISBN 0-8020-5787-X. OCLC 41156621.
- Broughton, Thomas Robert Shannon (1952). The magistrates of the Roman republic. Vol. 2. New York: American Philological Association.
- Chilver, Guy Edward Farquhar; Badian, Ernst (2012). "Vatinius, Publius". In Hornblower, Simon; Spawforth, Antony; Eidinow, Esther (eds.). The Oxford classical dictionary (4th ed.). Oxford: Oxford University Press. ISBN 978-0-19-954556-8. OCLC 959667246.
- Gruen, Erich (1995). The last generation of the Roman republic. Berkeley: University of California Press. ISBN 0-520-02238-6.
- Hawkins, Shane (2012). "On the Oscanism salaputium in Catullus 53". Transactions of the American Philological Association. 142 (2): 329–353. ISSN 0360-5949. JSTOR 23324455.
- Morstein-Marx, Robert (2021-08-05). Julius Caesar and the Roman People. Cambridge University Press. doi:10.1017/9781108943260. ISBN 978-1-108-94326-0. S2CID 242729962.
- Taylor, L R; Linderski, Jerzy (2013) [First ed. published 1960]. The voting districts of the Roman republic: the thirty-five urban and rural tribes (Updated ed.). Ann Arbor: University of Michigan Press. ISBN 978-0-472-11869-4. OCLC 793581620.
- Pina Polo, Francisco; Díaz Fernández, Alejandro (2019-09-23). The Quaestorship in the Roman Republic. de Gruyter. ISBN 978-3-11-066641-0.
- Zmeskal, Klaus (2009). Adfinitas (in German). Vol. 1. Passau: Verlag Karl Stutz. ISBN 978-3-88849-304-1.

=== Ancient sources ===
- Cicero (1891). "The speech of M. T. Cicero against Publius Vatinius". The orations of Marcus Tullius Cicero. Translated by Yonge, CD. London: George Bell & Sons – via Perseus.

Preceded by Julius Caesar; Publius Servilius Isauricus	Roman consul 47 BC with Quintus Fufius Calenus	Succeeded by Julius Caesar; Marcus Aemilius Lepidus
