= Marcus Octavius (aedile 50 BC) =

Roman general

Marcus Octavius (fl. 53 – 46 BC) was a Roman senator and military commander. He fought for Pompey in the civil war against Julius Caesar.

== Life ==
Marcus Octavius was son of Gnaeus Octavius, consul in 76 BC. In 53 BC, he accompanied his friend, Appius Claudius Pulcher, governor of Cilicia, to his province, but returned to Rome early in order to run for the office of curule aedile. Elected for the year 50 BC, he and his colleague, Marcus Caelius, asked Cicero, another governor of Cilicia, to send them panthers, to be displayed in the games the aediles had to hold at Rome.

During Caesar's civil war, Octavius sided with Pompey against Julius Caesar. At the end of 49 BC, he and Lucius Scribonius Libo were given joint charge of the Liburnian and Achaian squadrons of Pompey's fleet in the Adriatic and Ionian seas. Octavius and Libo defeated Caesar's fleet under Publius Cornelius Dolabella on the Dalmatian coast, and managed to trap fifteen Caesarian cohorts under Gaius Antonius on the island of Curicta, where they were starved into submission. After Libo departed with the Liburnian fleet, Octavius obtained some further successes, securing the defection of the island of Issa to his side, but failed to persuade the Roman citizens at Salona to do the same. He tried to besiege the city, but the inhabitants defended it vigorously, eventually making a surprise sortie and storming Octavius's camp. Suffering heavy losses and with winter approaching, Octavius was forced to withdraw to his ships and join Pompey at Dyrrachium.

In 48 BC, Octavius reappeared in Dalmatia, where he gathered a powerful following from Pompeian fugitives in the aftermath of Pompey's defeat at Pharsalus, and from defectors among the native population. The first man whom Caesar sent to Dalmatia to restore his position, Aulus Gabinius, was unsuccessful in dislodging Octavius, but the second, Publius Vatinius, successfully captured several places, raised Octavius's siege of Epidaurum, and defeated the Pompeian commander on a naval battle at the Battle of Tauris. Octavius was wounded but escaped by swimming. Stopping at Issa, Corcyra, and then Sicily, he went to Africa to join the remaining Pompeians led by Cato. In February 46 BC, Octavius commanded, alongside Publius Attius Varus, a fleet which intercepted some Caesarian warship near Aigimuros. No more is heard of Octavius, unless he is to be identified with the Marcus Octavius who commanded part of Mark Antony's fleet at the Battle of Actium in 31 BC (though Münzer finds this doubtful).
