= Battle of Tauris =

Ancient Roman naval battle

- Part of Caesar's civil war
Date	March 47 BC
Location	Tauris (likely modern-day Šipan, Dubrovnik-Neretva County, Croatia)
Result	Caesarian victory

Belligerents
Caesarians	Pompeians

Commanders and leaders
Publius Vatinius	Marcus Octavius (WIA)

Units involved
At least 1 quinquereme	1 quadrireme, 2 triremes, 8 biremes, 8 two-banked galleys, and an unknown number of small ships At least 1 quinquereme

Casualties and losses
None	1 quinquereme destroyed 2 triremes, 8 biremes, 8 two-banked galleys and other small ships captured Some other ships rammed or capsized

The Battle of Tauris was a naval battle during Caesar's civil war in which a Pompeian fleet led by Marcus Octavius was defeated by a Caesarian fleet led by Publius Vatinius operating off the coast of Dalmatia.

== Background ==
Caesar's civil war began on 10 January 49 BC. Caesar would go on to conquer Italy, Hispania, Sardinia, Corsica, and Sicilia, before invading Macedonia. During the invasion of Greece, Caesar faced a setback at Dyrrhachium before eventually defeating Pompey at the Battle of Pharsalus. Pompey fled to Egypt, where he was assassinated by the Egyptians in an attempt to appease Caesar. Caesar then intervened in the Egyptian civil war, deciding to help the Egyptian pharaoh Cleopatra to the throne and defeating her younger brother Ptolemy XIII in the Battle of the Nile.

== Prelude ==
By 47 BC, Octavius returned to the region with another fleet and began to blockade several Dalmatian ports, inflicting severe damage on the Caesarean shipping process. Octavius's army began to assault towns and raided the countryside, prompting Caesarean governor Lucius Cornificius to send a message requesting aid. In response, Publius Vatinius gathered soldiers in Brundisium who had been too sick to join Caesar's invasion of Greece. Vatinius only possessed a small number of ships consisting of a few heavy war ships and several smaller vessels. In contrast, Octavius had a significantly larger and more powerful fleet to use against the Caesareans. Aware of the fact that his fleet was vastly weaker than that of Octavius, Vatinius equipped his fleet with metal-wooden protrusions affixed to the front of the ships known as beaks. Vatinus's fleet set sail from Brundisium towards Epidaurum after receiving reports of a blockade in progress and finishing campaign preparations. The fleet eventually reached the island of Tauris (likely modern-day Šipan), unaware of Octavius's fleet occupying the area.

== Battle ==
Vatinius, unaware of the enemy's presence, was caught off guard when a single enemy ship approached. Octavius's fleet had been out of formation and spread out to avoid crashing during an ongoing storm. The two fleets then quickly became aware of the other's presence, with Vatinius' ships lowering their yard-arms to half-mast, drawing up a battle line to the side of the island. Vatinius's fleet was much weaker than that of Octavius, drawing up his ships with the warships in the center, including the flagship quinquereme. Octavius mirrored his formation, drawing up his ships with his flagship, a quadrireme, also in the middle. Although outnumbered, Vatinius signaled for his men to attack and advance towards the Pompeians, reef the sails, and lower the yard-arms further.

Vatinius's flagship rowed head on into Octavius's advancing flagship, destroying the beak of Vatinius's ship in the process. The clash pulverized and knocked away Octavius's beak, lodging it into the quadrireme's hull such that the two flagships became unable to separate. Despite being outnumbered, the Caesarian fleet had experienced veterans and was able to secure a victory by forcing the combat to occur in close quarters around the two flagships. Naval combat in such close quarters reduced the advantages of having a larger fleet as the fighting continued. Vatinius's gamble proved successful as his veterans managed to board the Pompeian ships, capsizing many due to panic. Octavius's flagship capsized, nearly drowning him until he removed his armor and swam to a light galley. Octavius and his remaining fleet retreated to Africa to join the Pompeian army under Gnaeus Pompeius.

== Aftermath ==
Vatinius achieved a great personal victory and for Caesar as well. The victory secured the province of Illyria, eliminated the last remnants of the Pompeiian faction, and ended all traces of the ongoing civil war from the region. Octavius would flee to Africa where he would command the remaining Pompeian fleet along with Publius Attius Varus. Caesar's Civil War would end with the Battles of Thapsus and Munda. Historical records of Octavius become obscure after this point, although he possibly fought in the service of Mark Antony against Augustus and fought in the Battle of Actium, where he is believed to have been killed. Vatinius would go on to govern Dalmatia and was awarded a triumph in 42 BC.

== See also ==
- Caesar's Civil War
- Julius Caesar
