= Lex Vatinia =

Ancient Roman law

The lex Vatinia (probably passed in May or early June 59 BC) also known as the lex Vatinia de provincia Caesaris or the lex Vatinia de imperio Caesaris, was a law which made Gaius Julius Caesar proconsular governor of Cisalpine Gaul and Illyricum for five years. It was named after and proposed, in the tribal assembly, by plebeian tribune Publius Vatinius. Along with the provinces, it also gave him the three legions already present there and the privilege of naming his own legates. Caesar also received Titus Labienus as legatus cum imperio (legate with imperium) in the law; Labienus' appointment may have been a sign of friendship between Pompey and Caesar.

== Impact ==
Caesar initially seemed prepared for a war of choice against the Dacian kingdom. However, after the unexpected death of the governor of Transalpine Gaul, and at the proposal of Pompey and Piso, the senate also added to Caesar's assigned provinces the further Gaul as well, giving him another legion. According to Cicero and Suetonius, the senate's assignment was done out of fear that if they did not do so, a tribune would introduce and the people would pass further legislation doing the assignment regardless.

The army assigned to Caesar in the Gauls and Illyricum proved useful in Caesar's civil war and, in the immediate term, for the protection of Caesar's legislative programme against repeal. The law – importantly – gave Caesar, as governor of the provinces, a chance to show his martial quality with great potential for military glory. To that end, he campaigned extensively in Germany, Britain, and Gaul. The specific provinces also furnished a substantial number of Roman citizens recruitable for his campaigns.

Caesar's position in Transalpine Gaul was annually reviewed by the senate. When the five year term expired, Caesar met with Pompey, Crassus, and others at the so-called Luca Conference where they renewed their political alliance and pushed through legislation to extend Caesar's Gallic commands.

The granting of a proconsulship in Gaul also gave Caesar legal immunity against prosecution by his political enemies and a number of armies. While Caesar did not appear to desire a war against his countrymen upon his prorogation pro consule to Gaul and Illyricum, by 49 BC amid a confrontation with the senate, Caesar decided to go to war to protect his personal interests.

== See also ==
- Lex Gabinia de piratis persequendis

== Bibliography ==
- Drogula, Fred K (2015-04-13). Commanders and Command in the Roman Republic and Early Empire. University of North Carolina Press Books. ISBN 978-1-4696-2127-2.
- Jameson, Shelagh (1970). "The Intended Date of Caesar's Return from Gaul". Latomus. 29 (3): 638–660. ISSN 0023-8856. JSTOR 41527732.
- Taylor, Lily Ross (1968). "The dating of major legislation and elections in Caesar's first consulship". Historia: Zeitschrift für Alte Geschichte. 17 (2): 173–193. ISSN 0018-2311. JSTOR 4435024.
