= Lucius Lucceius =

Roman republican politician, praetor (67 BC), and historian

Lucius Lucceius (born c. 105 BC; fl. 60s BC; possibly died in 42 BC) was a Roman politician. He was a friend of Cicero and Titus Pomponius Atticus, with which he exchanged letters. He served as praetor in 67 BC and stood unsuccessfully for the consulship of 59 alongside Julius Caesar. Withdrawing from politics after his electoral defeat, he became a man of letters and a budding historian. Pardoned for his support of Pompey during the civil war, little is known of him after 45 BC.

A member of the Senate, Lucceius served as urban or peregrine praetor in 67 BC. During his praetorship, when he failed to stand on the approach of the consul Manius Glabrio, Glabrio had Lucceius' curule chair smashed. He and the other praetors evidently were outraged and presided over their courts while standing in protest. He refused to take a province after his term, apparently citing disgust with provincial corruption, even though he was assigned Sardinia. In 64 BC, Lucceius attempted to prosecute Lucius Sergius Catalina for the murder of Sullan proscription victims but Catiline was acquitted, and supported Cicero against Catiline during the Catilinarian conspiracy the next year.

After some hesitation about seeking the consulship – he withdrew from the canvasses for 61 and 60 due to competition from Pompey's candidates – he stood in summer 60 BC for the consulship of 59 in a joint ticket with Julius Caesar. A rich man, he provided much of the money and bribes in their canvass. However, with his bribes matched by supporters of Marcus Calpurnius Bibulus, Lucceius was unable to secure the consulship with Caesar: instead Caesar and Bibulus were returned as victors from the comitia. After the failed campaign, he evidently gave up hopes for a consulship. He remained active at Rome, however, and is attested in letters and as a witness as the trial of Marcus Caelius Rufus in the 50s. By 56 BC he had evidently turned his pursuits to history, having written a history of the Social war and Sulla's civil war that followed it. Cicero, by letter around this time, asked Lucceius to compose a monograph on the Catilinarian conspiracy, with hopes that it would glorify Cicero's consulship; such a monograph does not appear, however, to have been completed.

By the start of Caesar's civil war in 49 BC, Lucceius was a friend and confidante of Pompey, participating in discussion of Caesar's peace proposals and negotiations at Dyrrhachium. After Caesar's victory at Pharsalus, Lucceius sought and received Caesar's pardon and afterwards went home to Italy. He exchanged letters of condolence with Cicero after Cicero's daughter Tullia's death in 45. Nothing certain is known after this. Appian, if certain emendations are made to identify a "Lucius" in Bella Civilia with this Lucius Lucceius, may count him among the victims of the triumviral proscriptions in 43–42 BC.

== Bibliography ==
- Alexander, Michael Charles (1990). Trials in the late Roman republic, 149 BC to 50 BC. Toronto: University of Toronto Press. ISBN 0-8020-5787-X. OCLC 41156621.
- Badian, Ernst (2012). "Lucceius, Lucius". In Hornblower, Simon; et al. (eds.). The Oxford classical dictionary (4th ed.). Oxford University Press. doi:10.1093/acrefore/9780199381135.013.3777. ISBN 978-0-19-954556-8. OCLC 959667246.
- Broughton, Thomas Robert Shannon (1952). The magistrates of the Roman republic. Vol. 2. New York: American Philological Association.
- Hinard, François (1985). Les proscriptions de la Rome républicaine (in French). Ecole française de Rome. ISBN 978-2-7283-0094-5.
- Münzer, F (1927). "Lucceius 6" . Realencyclopädie der classischen Altertumswissenschaft (in German). Vol. XIII, 2. Stuttgart: Butcher. cols. 1554–1559 – via Wikisource.
