= Fleet coinage (Mark Antony) =

The Fleet coinage was a set of bronze coins minted by Mark Antony in the eastern Mediterranean from 40 BC until 30 BC. The coinage introduced Roman-style denominations to the eastern half of the Roman Empire and formed the basis for the monetary reforms under Augustus. The coinage is also referred to by numismatists as RPC 1 1453-70 and 4092, after their designation in M. H. Crawford, Roman Republican Coinage (1975).

== Description ==
In 40 BC, the rivals Mark Antony and Octavian agreed to the Treaty of Brundisium, which assigned the eastern half of the Roman empire to Mark Antony. The fleet coinage was a set of bronze denominations issued to serve as small change for the region under his control. Modern scholars refer to it as the "fleet coinage" because they were minted by three of Antony's fleet prefects, Lucius Calpurnius Bibulus, Lucius Sempronius Atratinus and Marcus Oppius Capito, who are named on the obverse of the issues. There are six denominations, as follows:

Denominations of the Fleet coinage
Obverse design	Reverse design	Denomination	Image
Facing busts of Antony and Octavia	Two figures riding a chariot pulled by four hippocamps, HS Δ	Sestertius (4 asses)	RPC 1453
Busts of Antony and Octavian at left, facing bust of Octavia	Three ships, a triskeles below, Γ	Tressis (3 asses)	
Facing busts of Antony and Octavia	Two ships, with two hats of the Dioscuri above, Β	Dupondius (2 asses)	RPC 1455
Jugate busts of Antony and Octavia	A ship, with the head of Medusa below, Α	As (12 unciae)	RPC 1456
Bust of Antony	Prow of a ship, S	Semis (1/2 as = 6 unciae)	RPC 4092
Janiform head (of Antony and Octavian?)	Stem of a ship's prow, three dots	Quadrans (1/4 as = 3 unciae)	RPC 1467

Based on where the coins have been found, it appears that there were three separate mints: one at the Roman colony of Corinth, which had been founded in 44 BC; one at a coastal city in the Levant; and probably one in Piraeus, the port of Athens.

== Bibliography ==
- Amandry, M. (1986). "Le monnayage en bronze de Bibulus, Atratinus et Capito". Schweizerische Numismatische Rundschau. 65: 73–85.
- Amandry, M. (1987). "Le monnayage en bronze de Bibulus, Atratinus et Capito II". Schweizerische Numismatische Rundschau. 67.
- Amandry, M. (1990). "Le monnayage en bronze de Bibulus, Atratinus et Capito III". Schweizerische Numismatische Rundschau. 69: 65–96.
- Amandry, M. (2008). "Le monnayage de L. Sempronius Atratinus revisité". American Journal of Numismatics. 20: 421–434. ISSN 1053-8356. JSTOR 43580321.
- Bahrfeldt, M. (1905). "Die Munzen der Flottenprafekten des Marcus Antonius". Numismatische Zeitschrift. 37: 9–56.
- Rowan, Clare (2019). From Caesar to Augustus (c. 49 BC-AD 14) : using coins as sources. Cambridge, United Kingdom: Cambridge University Press. pp. 86–88. ISBN 9781107675698.
