= Siege of Curicta =

Siege in 49 BC

- Part of Caesar's Civil War
Date	c. late June 49 BC
Location	Curicta, Adriatic Sea 45°4′N 14°36′E
Result	Pompeian victory
Territorial changes	Capture of Curicta by Optimates

Belligerents
Optimates	Populares

Commanders and leaders
Lucius Scribonius Libo; Marcus Octavius	Gaius Antonius (POW) (surrendered); P. Cornelius Dolabella (POW); Titus Pullo

Units involved
Unknown	Many legionaries Some Gallic auxiliaries Fleet of ships

Strength
15 cohorts 40 galleys	Unknown

Casualties and losses
Unknown	Nearly all land units captured Fleet lost

The siege of Curicta was a military confrontation that took place during the early stages of Caesar's Civil War. Occurring in 49 BC, it saw a significant force of Populares commanded by Gaius Antonius besieged on the island of Curicta by an Optimate fleet under Lucius Scribonius Libo and Marcus Octavius. It immediately followed and was the result of a naval defeat by Publius Cornelius Dolabella and Antonius eventually capitulated under prolonged siege. These two defeats were some of the most significant suffered by the Populares during the civil war.

== Background ==
Deteriorating relations between Gaius Julius Caesar and the Roman Senate, with the support of Gnaeus Pompeius Magnus ("Pompey the Great"), culminated in Caesar crossing the Rubicon river in January 49BC and thus being labelled as an enemy of the people. Caesar seized numerous cities, towns and settlements such as Arretium, Auximum, Asculum and most significantly Corfinium as he moved down the Italian Peninsula. In response, Pompey evacuated his army across the Adriatic Sea to Greece. Despite failing to stop the evacuation at Brundisium, Caesar had succeeded in gaining full control of the peninsula.

== Prelude ==
Following the Siege of Brundisium, Caesar gave command of a fleet of 40 ships to Publius Cornelius Dolabella and sent him to patrol the coastline of Illyricum in order to protect against the Pompeian fleet. Gaius Antonius, the brother of Marcus Antonius, had also been appointed as Caesar's governor of Illyricum and had a significant force of 15 cohorts stationed on the island of Curicta and along the nearby shoreline.

At some point during 49 BC, Marcus Octavius and Lucius Scribonius Libo were given command of Pompey's large fleet and directed to begin operations against Caesar's forces in the Adriatic Sea.

== Siege ==
The exact date of the siege is unknown, although most sources place it before Gaius Scribonius Curio's expedition to Africa and by taking the poet Lucan's astrological descriptions which he used to date the event in his work Pharsalia, then that would mean that the events likely occurred in June 49 BC.

Dolabella's fleet engaged with the Pompeian fleet nearby to Curicta and, being heavily outnumbered, was thoroughly beaten with the majority of his ships either destroyed or captured. Dolabella himself was also captured. Libo and Octavius then put in place a naval blockade around Curicta which drove Antonius and his men, who had seemingly no chance of relief, to near starvation.

An attempt was made to break out from the siege using rafts which were sent in by Lucius Minucius Basilus on the mainland, however the Optimates managed to capture many of these in nets of Cilician design which rose up from below the water. Aided by the tide, two of these rafts managed to make it past the nets however one of them ran aground in the nearby shallows. On board were a band of 1000 Gallic auxiliaries from Opitergium who engaged in a last stand against the Optimates for a whole day. Upon realising that they were completely surrounded with no chance of escape, they killed one another rather than surrender.

During or shortly after these events, Antonius surrendered the island to the Pompeians.

== Aftermath ==
Following the siege Antonius was captured along with the majority of his men, many of whom would soon switch sides and bolster Pompey's ranks. In fact, one of Caesar's few mentions of these events claims that a centurion named Titus Pullo who was set against him during the Battle of Pharsalus had been instrumental in undermining Gaius Antonius' efforts to defend Curicta.

The battle was regarded as a disaster for the Caesarian cause. It seems to have had considerable significance to Caesar who mentions it alongside the death of Curio at the Battle of the Bagradas as one of the worst setbacks of the civil war. Of the four instances that Suetonius gives of the most disastrous defeats suffered by Populares in the civil war, both the defeat of Dolabella's fleet and the capitulation of the legions at Curicta are listed. It is also noted that all four major defeats were suffered by subordinates and not by Caesar himself.

While the events at Curicta are referred to in Caesar's commentaries they are notably absent from his main narrative; this may be because Caesar had the defeat retroactively expunged or simply that he never got around to writing about it.
