= Lucius Vettius =

Roman equestrian informer

Lucius Vettius (died 59 BC) was a Roman equestrian informer who informed on the Second Catilinarian conspiracy in 63 BC and later, in 59 BC, denounced a supposed plot of many conservative-leaning senators to murder Pompey. He was jailed and then found dead.

== Early life ==
Vettius was an equestrian from Picenum and served under Gnaeus Pompeius Strabo and Sulla. He was a friend of Lucius Sergius Catilina (known in English as Catiline).

By 63 BC, Vettius had turned professional informant. He turned against Catiline and informed on the Second Catilinarian conspiracy to one of the then-consuls, Cicero. Among others, he accused then-praetor Julius Caesar of being part of the plot, claiming he had a document in Caesar's handwriting that was intended for Catiline, which was probably forged. Similar accusations were brought by Quintus Curius, another informant, but these allegations are broadly dismissed: "none of these facts or allegations does much to increase the almost vanishingly low preexisting probability of Caesar's complicity".

Suetonius relates that after these accusations, Vettius was then badly handled by Caesar, who "punished [him] quite severely... destroying some of his personal goods, allowing him to be roughly beaten by a crowd at a contio [public meeting], and throwing him into prison". Robert Morstein-Marx, a classicist, notes that Caesar's actions are "consistent with Roman legal custom protesting the dignity of magistrates and attitudes toward those who gave false accusation".

== Vettius affair and death ==
Some time in 59 BC, the year of the consulship of Gaius Julius Caesar and Marcus Calpurnius Bibulus, Vettius "announced a conspiracy of leading nobles to murder Pompey". Supposedly, this conspiracy would have involved an attack on Pompey while he attended gladiatorial games in the forum. He included in his list of conspirators many big names: Bibulus (one of the consuls), the younger and elder Curiones, two of the Lentuli, Lucius Aemilius Paullus, and Marcus Junius Brutus. The conspiracy, according to Vettius, was led by the younger Curio, who at the time was leading the opposition of younger nobles against the so-called First Triumvirate and gaining substantial popular support.

His accusations were disbelieved: he claimed that he had received a dagger from a servant of the consul Bibulus, to laughter from the senators who asked how he had no other means to acquire a weapon; one of the Curiones protested Paullus could not be involved, for he was in Macedonia. Moreover, Bibulus had himself notified Pompey earlier of a plot against his life; after hearing his accusations, the senators ordered Vettius thrown in jail for his self-incriminating confession of carrying a dagger within the city.

The next day, he was produced before the public in a contio by Caesar and his tribunician ally Publius Vatinius; dropping mention of Brutus and Bibulus, he then accused Lucullus, Lucius Domitius Ahenobarbus, Gaius Fannius, Gaius Calpurnius Piso, Marcus Iuventius Laterensis, and Cicero – indirectly under the terms of a certain "eloquent ex-consul" – of being part of the plot. It is likely that the changes in his story were induced by Caesar: who "it appears, intimidated Vettius and induced him to alter his testimony... in particularly to drop the name of Brutus, son of Caesar's mistress Servilia". Vatinius pressured Vettius to name more names and promised to pass legislation to establish a special tribunal. These changed accusations also were not believed, as there was little corroborating evidence available. Returned to jail, shortly thereafter, Vettius was found dead. His death, officially of natural causes but rumoured to be murder, put an end to thoughts of a special tribunal.

Views on the affair differ. Cicero, writing around the time (and also accused of being part of it), stressed his suspicions of Caesar and Vatinius' roles. For him, "Caesar had stage-managed the whole affair for the beginning... as a means of casting suspicion over the rising star of [the younger] Curio". However, Cicero's later speech In Vatinium blames Vatinius for inciting the affair. This hypothesis, that Vettius was induced to fabricate accusations to ruin the younger Curio's electoral chances and discredit certain opponents of Caesar, has "won the assent of most commentators".

Walter Allen, in The "Vettius Affair" Once More (1950), argued that Caesar was to blame for the accusations with the additional motive of trying to drive a wedge between Pompey and Cicero. Erich Gruen, in The Last Generation of the Roman Republic (1995), dismisses this theory, arguing that "Pompey's relations with the nobilitas were already sufficiently strained" and that "the notion of Vettius as Caesar's agent is difficult to swallow [when he] had endeavoured to implicate Caesar in the Catilinarian conspiracy" three years earlier in 62 BC. It is also possible that Pompey or his allies concocted the accusations "in order to deflect the growing odium onto Bibulus" and lend credence to his often claims of fearing for his life.

The aftermath of the affair led to no major changes: "no wave of popular indignation arose against Bibulus or his allies... no discernible pressure was exerted to take preemptive vengeance on those who might have wanted Pompey dead; there were no 'kangaroo courts'[;] in the senate [there was] no rush to condemn in order to please the powerful... as one sees in a true dominatio": the allegations were, "for all practical purposes, discounted". Different interpretations of who instigated the affair lead to different interpretations of who had failed to achieve their goals. Lily Ross Taylor viewed Vettius as a Caesarian agent and that "Caesar blundered badly" in the plot. Other modern works generally dismiss reading too much into the poorly-understood and badly-documented affair.

== Legacy ==
Vettius was possibly the subject of the Roman poet Catullus' 98th poem, the subject of which is described as having a stinking and rotten mouth which is verbosus et fatuus and "always accusing other people of being involved in conspiracies".

== See also ==
- Second Catilinarian conspiracy
- Julius Caesar and Marcus Calpurnius Bibulus
