= Quintus Cassius Longinus =

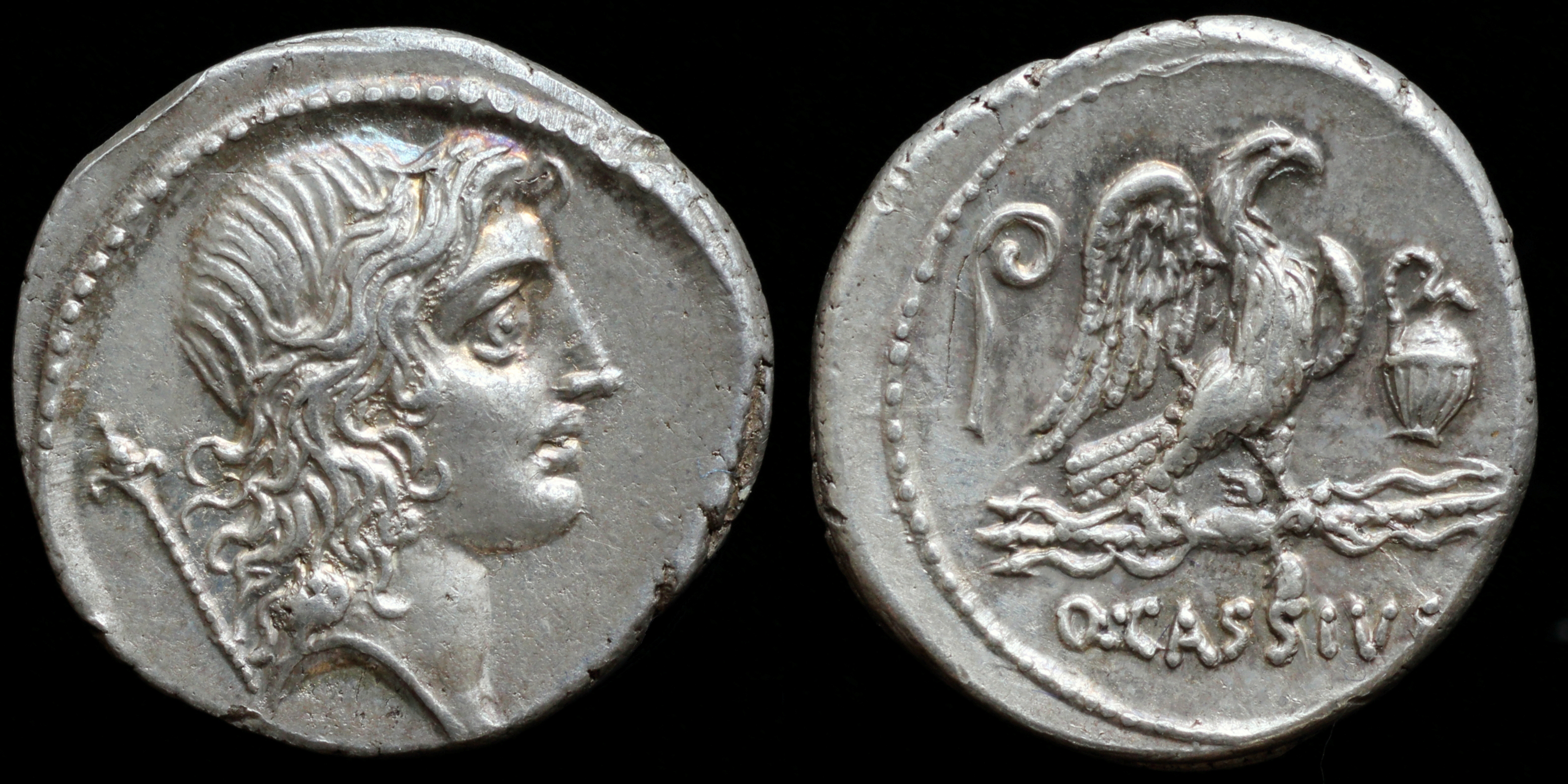

First side of the image: O: young Jupiter (it could also be Bonus Eventus or Genius Populi Romani), scepter behind
Second side of the image: R: eagle on thunderbolt, lituus on left and jug on right Q·CASSIVS
Silver denarius struck by Quintus Cassius Longinus in Rome 55 BC. ref.: Cassia 7; sear5 #391; Syd 916, Cr428/3.

Quintus Cassius Longinus, the brother or cousin of Cassius (the assassin of Julius Caesar), was a governor in Hispania (the Iberian Peninsula, comprising modern Spain and Portugal) for Caesar.

Cassius was one of the tresviri monetales of the Roman mint in 55 BC. He served as a quaestor of Pompey in Hispania Ulterior in 54 BC. In 49 BC, as tribune of the people, he strongly supported the cause of Caesar, by whom he was made governor of Hispania Ulterior. He treated the provincials with great cruelty, and his appointment in 48 BC to take the field against Juba I of Numidia gave him an excuse for fresh oppression. The result was an unsuccessful insurrection at Corduba. During this event, Cassius was twice stabbed, however soon fully recovered. The conspirators were captured, tortured and executed. Cassius punished the leaders with merciless severity, and made the lot of the provincials harder than ever.

At last some of his troops revolted under the quaestor Marcellus, who was proclaimed governor of the province. Cassius was surrounded by Marcellus in Ulia. Bogud, king of Mauretania, and Marcus Lepidus, proconsul of Hispania Citerior, to whom Cassius had applied for assistance, negotiated an arrangement with Marcellus whereby Cassius was to be allowed to go free with the legions that remained loyal to him. Cassius sent his troops into winter quarters, and hastened to board a ship at Malaca with his ill-gotten gains, but was wrecked in a storm at the mouth of the Iberus (Ebro), in which he was killed. His tyrannical government of Hispania greatly injured the cause of Caesar.
