= Lucius Caecilius Metellus (tribune 49 BC) =

Tribune of the plebs in 49 BC

Lucius Caecilius Metellus was tribune of the plebs in 49 BC. He was the son of the homonymous consul of 68 BC; during his youth he lived in Sicily with his father and later was assigned there during his own quaestorship in 52 BC. He opposed Caesar during the civil war, supporting the Pompeian efforts around Capua, in March 49, before Caesar occupied the Italian peninsula.

In the first months of the civil war in 49 BC, Caesar occupied Italy and forced Pompey to flee to Macedonia. On 1 April 49 BC a senate meeting was held – involving the few senators who remained at Rome – at the initiative of the tribunes aligned with Caesar. Caesar used the proceedings to inveigh against the harms done to him by the Pompeians and to request money and troops. Possibly when the rump senate was to approve Caesar's financial requests, Metellus vetoed the proceedings.

Afterwards, Caesar moved to raid the aerarium (state treasury) anyway: in response, Metellus put himself before the door and blocked the Caesarians' way. It is not clear whether Caesar was himself present; some ancient sources, such as Plutarch and Lucan, report a confrontation between Metellus and Caesar within the pomerium, but whether this actually occurred is not clear. Regardless, in most tellings, Metellus' life was threatened by Caesar or his men and Metellus was forced aside. The episode, which showed Caesar, who purported to have started the civil war to defend tribunician rights, trampling on a tribune's rights, was embarrassing. Cicero records Caesar making some threats to have Metellus killed after the fact. Caesar regardless left the city shortly afterwards and the mention of the confrontation before the aerarium is omitted in Caesar's civil war commentaries.

Metellus is last recorded as trying to find his way back to Italy in the aftermath of Caesar's victory at Pharsalus; Caesar wrote to his lieutenant in Italy, Mark Antony, to deny Metellus' return.

== See also ==
- gens Caecilia

== Bibliography ==
- Broughton, Thomas Robert Shannon (1952). The magistrates of the Roman republic. Vol. 2. New York: American Philological Association.
- Goldsworthy, Adrian (2006). Caesar: Life of a Colossus. Yale University Press. ISBN 978-0-300-13919-8.
- Mackay, Christopher S (2009). The breakdown of the Roman republic. Cambridge: Cambridge University Press. ISBN 978-0-521-51819-2.
- Meier, Christian (1995) [First published, in German by Severin und Siedler, 1982]. Caesar. Translated by McLintock, David. Basic Books. ISBN 0-465-00895-X.
- Morstein-Marx, Robert (2021). Julius Caesar and the Roman People. Cambridge University Press. doi:10.1017/9781108943260. ISBN 978-1-108-83784-2. LCCN 2021024626. S2CID 242729962.
- Münzer, F (1897). "Caecilius 75" . Realencyclopädie der classischen Altertumswissenschaft (in German). Vol. III, 1. Stuttgart: Butcher. col. 1205 – via Wikisource.
