= Ulia =

Ulia Fidentia or simply Ulia was a Roman municipium in the province of Hispania Baetica. The site is the location of the current city of Montemayor, Córdoba.

During the Second Hispanian campaign of Caesar's Civil War almost all the towns of Hispania Ulterior had switched allegiance to Pompey's side, except for a few towns, including Ulia. Caesar therefore honored the town with the appellation Fidentia.
