= Luca Conference =

Meeting of Caesar, Pompey and Crassus at Lucca

Lucca
- Comune
- Comune di Lucca
- Location of Lucca in Italy Lucca (Tuscany)
- Coordinates: 43°50′30″N 10°30′10″E
- Country: Italy
- Region: Tuscany
- Province: Lucca (LU)
- Time zone: UTC+1 (CET)
  - Summer (DST): UTC+2 (CEST)

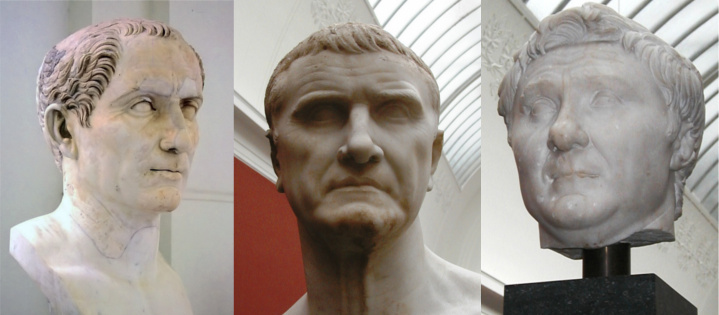
From left to right: Caesar, Crassus, and Pompey

The Luca Conference was a 56 BC meeting of the three Roman politicians of the First Triumvirate — Caesar, Pompey and Crassus — that took place at the town of Luca (modern Lucca, in Tuscany), near Pisa. Luca was the southern most town in the then Roman province of Cisalpine Gaul, where Caesar was serving as Governor. The meeting renewed the fraying political alliance, and further cemented the three men's increasing consolidation of power in the Roman Republic. It represented a material re-arrangement in the nature of the Triumvirate. Pompey had lost a great deal of prestige; and Caesar, who had been an adroit political operator and a facilitator of the alliance at first, assumed a great deal of prestige and power within the group. While it restored the ascendancy of the arrangement in the Roman State, it materially changed the relations between the three.

The conference took place in Luca because Luca was the southernmost city in Caesar’s province of Cisalpine Gaul - as governor he was not able to leave his province legally.

== Background ==
The Roman general Julius Caesar was in the midst of fighting the Gallic Wars. At the end of 57 BC, he had conquered much of Gaul and had been awarded a 15-day supplicatio, a feast of thanksgiving, longer than any before. Caesar's gravitas was growing quickly, and he aimed to leverage it to his advantage.

Rome was in turmoil. “Caesar had already been away for two years, and the time had not passed quietly in Rome. His consulship had been controversial, but in many ways was mild in comparison with the turbulent months that followed, when orchestrated mob violence, instigated by Clodius, became a regular feature of public life.” Clodius's violent populist campaigns had been undermining relations between Crassus and Pompey, likely with either the former’s and/or Caesar's secret blessing; neither Crassus nor Pompey was comfortable with the glory Caesar was winning in his Gallic campaign.

By 56 BC, the bonds between the three men were fraying. "Pompey told Cicero that he believed Crassus was supporting Clodius. He even claimed that Crassus was plotting to murder him, and once again relapsed into morbid fears and sent for extra bodyguards from his rural clients. Mistrustful of Crassus, there were indications that Pompey was also beginning to wonder whether or not he still needed Caesar."

Early in the year, before the military campaigning season had begun, Caesar invited Marcus Crassus, then Pompey, to a meeting. Suetonius says that: "Caesar made Pompey and Crassus come to Luca, a city in his province, where he persuaded them to seek a second consulship, thwart Domitius, and secure for him a five year extension to his provincial command."

== Caesar in Luca ==
After the busy campaigning season, Caesar crossed the Alps into Italy and wintered in Roman Luca, the southernmost city in Caesar's province of Cisalpine Gaul. What exactly happened in Luca is uncertain, and there are multiple accounts. The meeting is mentioned by multiple chroniclers: Plutarch, Cassius Dio, Appian, Suetonius, and Cicero. The only contemporary account is from Cicero, whose account paints a simpler and less ostentatious picture of the event, leading some historians to question the veracity of the other accounts.

Generally, accounts agree that the meeting renewed the political alliance known as the First Triumvirate. They agreed that Pompey and Crassus would again stand for the consulship in 55 BC. The elections would be postponed until the winter so that Caesar could support them by sending soldiers home to Rome to vote for them. Once elected, they would extend Caesar's command in Gaul by five years. At the end of their joint consular year, Crassus would get the influential and lucrative governorship of Syria, to use as a base for a grand campaign to conquer Parthia. Pompey would keep Hispania in absentia. "In this way, since after their consulship Pompey and Crassus could expect major provincial commands, all three men would have armies and formal imperium for the next few years." With an army of his own, Crassus gained the opportunity to rival Caesar's and Pompey's military achievements. "Pompey was also satisfied. More than either of the others he had appeared in recent months to have been drifting away, but in the end he would not have been as well off if the triumvirate had been broken." As part of the bargain, Cicero was to be obliged to end his criticisms and become a loyal spokesman for the alliance.

According to Plutarch, a large number of political visitors came to Caesar over the winter, including some 200 senators and 120 lictors. Plutarch directly connects the meeting to the Gallic Wars. He holds that Caesar was using the winter to maintain high office, and spent lavishly to secure votes and favors in Rome. He mentions that Pompey and Crassus came, but gives no reason for their visit. Plutarch complicates matters by writing three different versions of the account: one each in his biographies of Pompey, Crassus, and Caesar. His account in Crassus is the most detailed. In it, he claims that Pompey and Crassus returned to Rome and let rumors spread that some agreement was reached, but were mute on the specifics. They were purposefully evasive about a desire to run for consul and seemed to deny wanting the consulship in direct questioning by the Senate. Given this, a number of other candidates decided to run, among them Ahenobarbus. Pompey and Crassus then dropped any pretense and openly ran. The effect of the richest man in Rome, and one of its greatest generals, both running for consul scared off all other candidates but Ahenobarbus. The apparent trickery of Pompey and Crassus led to general outrage at their conduct. In response, Cato the Younger pushed hard for Ahenobarbus' candidacy. Pompey and Crassus turned to violence to secure the consulship. In Crassus, Pompey explains there was almost six months between the conference and the events that followed, but neglects the timeline in his other works, as well as a clear sequence of events.

Suetonius's account provides scant detail, aside from that an agreement was reached. Appian also holds that an agreement was reached (in private) as well as that Pompey and Crassus's forces nearly killed Ahenobarbus on a very violent election day.

Dio's account focuses on Pompey, whom he paints as afraid to play second fiddle to Caesar, especially as Caesar gained increasing glory in Gaul. Pompey thus sought to ally himself ever tighter with Crassus. Pompey and Crassus campaigned outside of election season, which was against the law, but got around this with the help of the tribune of the plebs. Dio also notes that Publius Crassus, son of Marcus, brought troops to help ensure Pompey and his father's election. This is important because Publius was at the time under the command of Caesar. It seems unlikely that he would have been able to go without Caesar's express wishes, making the consulship of Pompey and Crassus firmly endorsed by Caesar. Whether this detail was hammered out at Luca is not mentioned by Dio, though Plutarch seems to think that it was one of the terms.

Cicero leaves out any mention of Crassus, despite having covered a previous meeting between Crassus and Caesar at Ravenna. Cicero mentions that Pompey visited Caesar, but ascribes no special importance to the meeting, which might have been expected if there really were over 300 of the most important people in Rome visiting Caesar. However, Cicero appears to have understood that Caesar and Pompey had, if not forged an alliance, aligned their goals. Cicero's understanding of the political strength of Pompey and Caesar forced him to drop a contentious motion he was to make before the Senate on 15 May regarding land reform in Campania; Caesar was quite opposed to Cicero's motion. Historian Allen Ward argues that this is evidence that before May (and thus likely at Luca) Caesar and Pompey had a political understanding. Furthermore, he says it cements the idea that the triumvirs kept the terms of the deal partially secret until Pompey and Crassus ran as consuls late in the year. Ward analyzes that Cicero likely knew some sort of ominous bargain had been struck at Luca, but did not know the extent of the danger until the fall. Cicero privately cursed his now awkward political situation: he was forced to either look like a fool, or to go along with politics he did not agree with.

== Impact ==
The Conference forestalled a civil war by binding the fates of three power hungry and ambitious men, but it did not prevent conflict forever. In some ways the meeting made the political situation more dire, and even more dependent on the three men. The death of Crassus in 53 BC at the disastrous Battle of Carrhae destroyed the political balance the triumvirate created at Luca, foreshadowing Caesar's Civil War and the end of the Roman Republic.
