= Marcus Calpurnius Bibulus =

Roman Senator and general

Consul of the Roman Republic
- In office January 59 BC – December 59 BC Serving with Julius Caesar
- Preceded by: Lucius Afranius and Quintus Caecilius Metellus Celer
- Succeeded by: Lucius Calpurnius Piso Caesoninus and Aulus Gabinius

Personal details
- Born: c. 102 BC
- Died: 48 BC
- Spouse(s): 1 Unknown; 2 Porcia
- Children: Two sons (with first wife); Lucius Calpurnius Bibulus (with first wife); Two children (with Porcia); Calpurnia (with Porcia)

Military service
- Allegiance: Roman Republic
- Commands: Governor of Syria; Commander of the Adriatic Fleet

Marcus Calpurnius Bibulus (c. 102 – 48 BC) was a politician of the Roman Republic. He was a conservative and upholder of the established social order who served in several magisterial positions alongside Julius Caesar and conceived a lifelong enmity towards him. In 59 BC, he was consul alongside Caesar. Their partnership was contentious to the extent that Caesar's supporters assaulted Bibulus in Rome's main forum on the eve of an important vote. Bibulus withdrew from public politics for the rest of his term.

Between 51 and 50 BC, he was governor of Syria, where he was effective but alienated the army by taking too much personal credit for the repulse of the Parthians. In 49, after Caesar's civil war broke out, Bibulus aligned himself with Pompey and was in charge of the fleet tasked with preventing Caesar from shipping his army across the Adriatic. He failed to stop Caesar's first fleet but was successful in delaying Caesarian reinforcements from landing in Greece. While in command of the blockade in 48 BC, he died of illness.

== Early life ==
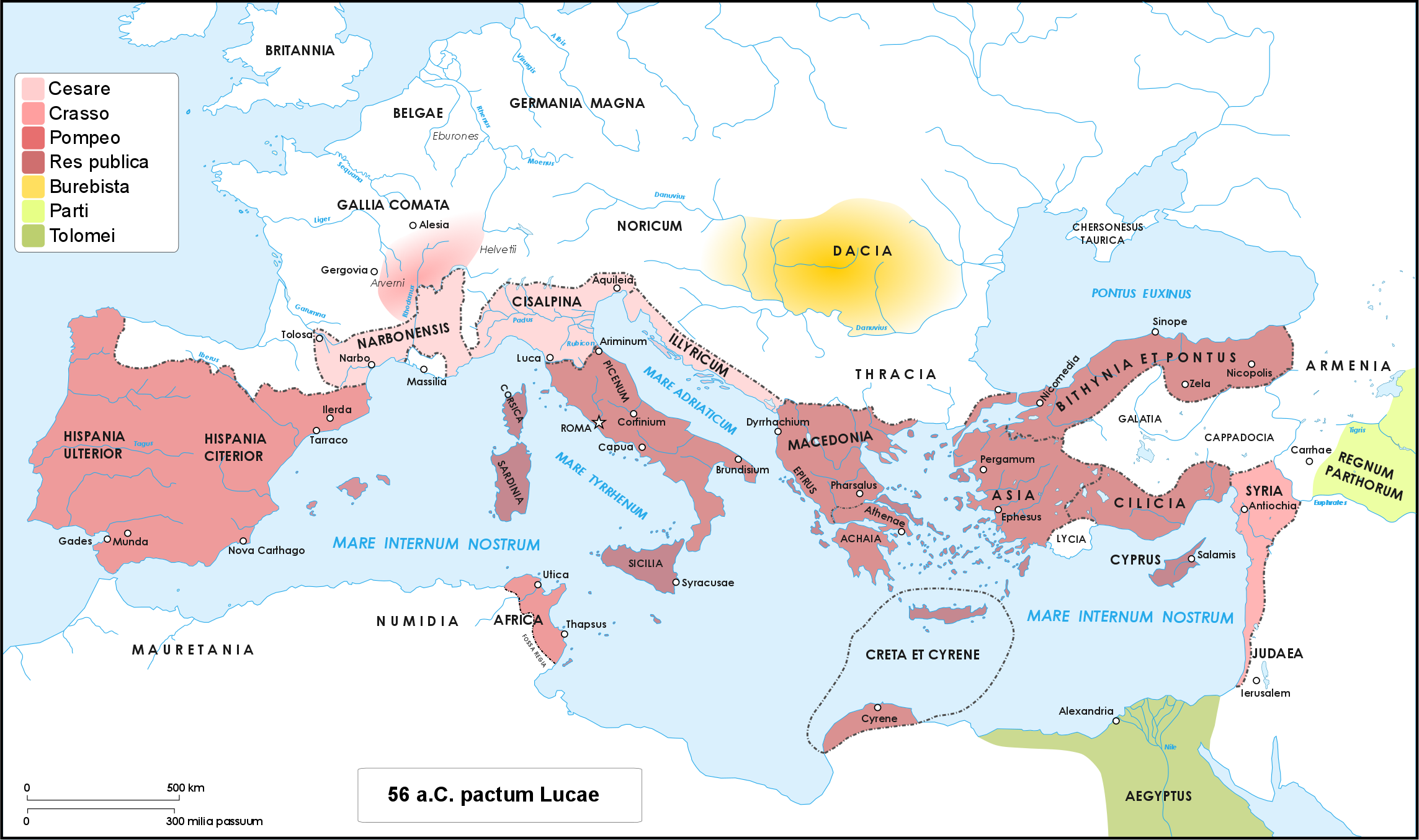
The Roman Republic at the time of Bibulus

Bibulus was a member of the plebeian gens Calpurnia. His branch of the family was likely descended from the Calpurnii Pisones. Although he is the first person with his name as consul, the extent of his connections in the republican aristocracy and possible descent from the Pisones precludes his status as a novus homo. The cognomen Bibulus may be a joke, in Latin the word bibulus refers to one who enjoys drinking.

Born probably around the time of his exact contemporary Gaius Julius Caesar, c. 102 BC, he married probably in his twenties to an unknown first wife. Little is known of his life before he became curule aedile in 65 BC. That year, he served with his later praetorian and consular colleague, Caesar. According to Suetonius and Dio, his term was overshadowed by Caesar, who spent extravagantly to put on the Megalensian games, winning him considerable acclaim and popularity. A few years later, in 62 BC, Bibulus served a praetorship, also alongside Caesar. Bibulus' activities were focused a military campaign suppressing remnants of the Catilinarian conspiracy among the Paeligni in northern Italy. He also opposed Caesar's agitation that year.

Some time after his aedilate, he married the daughter of the younger Cato and his first wife Atilia, cementing a strong political alliance. Aligned with Cato, Lucius Domitius Ahenobarbus, Marcus Favonius, and Publius Servilius Isauricus, Bibulus was part of a cohesive and powerful political faction which jockeyed for power alongside other groupings such as those of Lucullus, the Metelli, the Claudii, Pompey, and Caesar. Like many of their contemporaries, Bibulus' group opposed the ascendency of overweening generals such as Pompey and Caesar, whom they feared would overthrow senatorial government. Bibulus and Cato also both nursed personal grudges against Caesar, with Bibulus' hatred likely stemming from Caesar's monopolisation of the credit of their joint aedilate.

== Consulship ==
Bibulus stood in 60 for the consulship of 59 BC. it was well known by this point that Caesar would almost certainly be one of the victors. Caesar campaigned with a Lucius Lucceius, who bankrolled huge sums spent to buy votes. With substantial effort, including bribes of their own and more licit canvassing, Bibulus and his faction were able to have him returned as Caesar's colleague. His presence as consul was expected to counterbalance Caesar with his consular veto. The creation of the so-called First Triumvirate between Caesar, Pompey, and Crassus in the aftermath of the elections also led to a reorganisation of Roman politics to counterbalance the powerful new alliance around Caesar.

Bibulus took a leading role in this conflict. When Caesar started the year bringing a promised agrarian bill which would settle urban Romans and veterans on lands to be purchased by the state for distribution. Opposition centred mainly not on the ends they sought but rather the popularity and prestige which they, and especially Caesar as consul, would accrue from passage. Nor did the opposition necessarily have a majority in the senate – also having the support of Pompey and Crassus as influential former consuls] – but Cato's filibuster forestalled a vote. At a public meeting (Latin: contio) presenting the bill, Caesar summoned Bibulus to offer his own reasons to object. He gave none, exclaiming only that he would not permit any reforms during his consulship and that he would not permit even a unanimous people to enact the bill. When Caesar moved a vote on the bill anyway, Bibulus and three allied tribunes came to the Forum: Bibulus sought to obnuntiate the proceedings, making them religiously invalid, and the tribunes sought to exercise their vetos. However, Bibulus and his friends were attacked by the crowd as they voiced their opposition, driving them from the Forum, with his fasces broken to symbolise the crowd's repudiation of his magistracy. In their forceful absence, the law was then passed.

The next day Bibulus summoned the Senate to meet and asked it to annul the law, arguing it had been carried by violence (per vim lata) and contrary to the auspices. However, the Senate refused to do so, either because it believed the law to be legitimately an expression of the people or because it was intimidated by Caesar's mobs. Further legislation was then brought at Pompey's insistence, probably in May, to distribute the lands around Campania secured during the Second Punic War and hitherto untouched. The opposition to Caesar, at an ebb, changed tact. Instead of opposing Caesar directly, Bibulus conspicuously shut himself in his house, claiming that Caesar was threatening his life. While shut in his house, Bibulus also issued edicts attacking Caesar and messages announcing bad omens to throw up procedural objections to Caesar's continued legislation. This strategy of boycott over the year greatly eroded the popularity of the three allies, presenting Caesar as a tyrannical figure unchecked by his colleague. Indeed it also expanded, with three other tribunes and some senators joining in the boycott, all signalling that Caesar and his allies' tactics were trampling on the dignity and liberty embodied in the people's other magistrates.

The Vettius affair in mid-summer saw an informant named Lucius Vettius accuse Bibulus and other men associated with him of a plot to kill Caesar and Pompey. The veracity of this plot is dubious, not only because Vettius' story changed in his two tellings, but also due to Bibulus' role in producing the informant. Regardless Vettius died shortly thereafter, after changing the target of his accusations, amid rumours of murder. The senate, showing more independence than Bibulus and his allies signalled by their boycott, debated the matter soberly rather than seizing on it as pretext for a witch-hunt. Also in the summer, Bibulus by edict ordered the consular elections delayed until October, which has been suggested as a ploy to reduce turnout among the poor. Caesar's effort to protest this edict before Bibulus' house, however, found few supporters, further suggesting dissatisfaction with Caesar's political position. Caesar also brought a law to rein in provincial extortion and corruption, the lex Julia de repetundis, which passed likely with the support of Cato and Bibulus' faction.

Although the elections fell within Bibulus' turn to hold fasces, he did not depart his house to hold them. Instead, Caesar held the elections in accordance with Bibulus' edict that October. Caesar's father-in-law Lucius Calpurnius Piso and Pompey's former legate Aulus Gabinius were returned as consuls; Bibulus' friend Lucius Domitius Ahenobarbus was returned as one of the praetors. At the end of the year, he was barred by one of the new plebeian tribunes, Publius Clodius Pulcher, from delivering his valedictory speech.

== Senator and governor ==
Throughout the 50s Bibulus continued to attack Pompey in the Senate, blaming him for the fighting between Publius Clodius and Titus Annius Milo in 56 BC, to the point that Pompey was convinced that Bibulus was in league with plotters who were intent on assassinating him. He also voted against Pompey being granted permission to go to Egypt in person to restore Ptolemy XII Auletes to his throne. Nevertheless, by the end of the 50s, Pompey had been cynically embraced by the boni, who saw in him a champion to bring down Caesar. In 52 BC as a consular senator Bibulus proposed an unconstitutional and illegal resolution, which the Senate accepted, allowing Pompey to serve as sole consul to deal with the breakdown of order in Rome after the murder of Publius Clodius.

As a result of a law passed by Pompey during his sole consulship, proscribing that governorships could not be held by persons who had served as praetor or consul within five years of leaving office, Bibulus was not appointed to a post-consular governorship until 51 BC. He then became governor of Syria. He severely offended the soldiery in Syria by claiming much of the credit due to their commander Gaius Cassius Longinus, whom he outranked. Two years before, Crassus had led the Roman army of the east to a calamitous defeat at Carrhae. Longinus had advised Crassus against his misguided actions and when Crassus was killed had taken command and led the survivors in a successful retreat. He then saved the province of Syria by beating the Parthians at Antioch. For this he became the darling of the army. Bibulus arrived to a situation already stabilising. He sent the Senate a report of his pursuit and mopping up of the Parthians and his reorganisation of Syria's defences. The Senate granted Bibulus a thanksgiving of twenty days. With the Parthian threat still present, Bibulus sent two of his sons to Egypt in 50 BC to demand the recall of Roman soldiers who had settled there, but they were killed by the soldiers, who refused to march. When Cleopatra sent him the murderers to be punished, he returned them saying it was up to the Senate to punish them.

== Civil war and death ==
The Roman Republic, shown in green, shortly after Bibulus' death

Completing his governorship, Bibulus returned to the west in 49 BC to find that civil war had erupted between Caesar and Pompey. Aligning himself with Pompey, he was placed in charge of Pompey's fleet in the Adriatic, to ensure that Caesar and his troops could not cross from Brundisium in Italy to Epirus to challenge Pompey's army. Having only assembled half the necessary ships, Caesar decided to take seven legions across the Adriatic, and to have the ships return and transport the remaining legions once they arrived at Brindisi. Transporting seven legions across the Adriatic Sea to Greece would ordinarily be difficult due to the winter season. But because Caesar knew that the calendar was out of step with the astronomical seasons due to his responsibilities as pontifex maximus, he had the advantage of knowing the crossing would be easier than expected. This assisted Caesar to an extent as the Adriatic was sufficiently treacherous to deter Bibulus' war galleys from venturing far from their base at Corfu.

Bibulus was caught by surprise when on the evening of 6 November Caesar and his fleet successfully crossed the Adriatic, landing at Palaeste. Although Bibulus was stationed only 50 miles (80 km) south of Palaeste, he had not sent out scouts and his ships were not ready to put to sea to intercept Caesar's transports. When he heard of Caesar's crossing, he ordered his crews to return to their ships, and sailed northward, hoping to capture the ships carrying Caesar's reinforcements. Again too slow, he only managed to arrive for their return journey to Italy, capturing and burning 30 of Caesar's transports. He then maneuvered to prevent any further ships crossing to reinforce or supply Caesar. He only captured one transport, which had been chartered by some private individuals and had refused to obey Bibulus's orders. Enraged, he ordered the entire crew killed.

Bibulus then blockaded all the harbors along the coast, hoping to prevent any further crossings from Italy, and leaving Caesar stranded in Epirus. He found that he could not resupply his ships without abandoning the blockade, and so he attempted to bluff Caesar's legates at Oricum into persuading Caesar to agree to a temporary truce so that he could resupply. When Bibulus refused to guarantee the safety of the envoys Caesar wished to send to discuss a peaceful settlement with Pompey, Caesar realised it was a ploy and pulled out of negotiations. Determined to continue with the blockade, Bibulus pushed himself too hard; he fell ill in early 48 BC and died near Corcyra before the end of winter.

== Family ==
Bibulus was the son of Gaius Calpurnius. Bibulus married twice. From his first marriage he had three sons, including the later statesman Lucius Calpurnius Bibulus. His two eldest sons Marcus and Gaius were killed in Egypt by soldiers whom Aulus Gabinius had left there after restoring Ptolemy Auletes to the throne. He may have had a daughter called Calpurnia, who was the first wife of Roman senator Marcus Valerius Messalla Corvinus. His second wife was Cato's daughter Porcia, whom he married sometime between 58 and 53 BC, by her he had two more children, at least one of them a son who lived to adulthood. The other may have been a daughter but it is not certain. (Note: Zmeskal believes the other child to be identified with the daughter who married Messalla.) After Bibulus' death Porcia married Brutus, who was to be a ringleader of Caesar's assassins.

== Bibliography ==
=== Modern sources ===
- Broughton, Thomas Robert Shannon (1952). The magistrates of the Roman republic. Vol. 2. New York: American Philological Association.
- Drogula, Fred K (2019). Cato the Younger: life and death at the end of the Roman republic. New York: Oxford University Press. ISBN 978-0-19-086902-1. OCLC 1090168108.
- Goldsworthy, Adrian (2006). Caesar: life of a colossus. Yale University Press. ISBN 978-0-300-12048-6.
- Gruen, Erich (1995). The last generation of the Roman republic. Berkeley, CA: University of California Press. ISBN 0-520-02238-6.
- Meier, Christian (1995) [First published, in German by Severin und Siedler, 1982]. Caesar. Translated by McLintock, David. Basic Books. ISBN 0-465-00895-X.
- Morrell, Kit (2017). Pompey, Cato, and the governance of the Roman empire. Oxford University Press. ISBN 978-0-19-875514-2.
- Morstein-Marx, Robert (2021). Julius Caesar and the Roman people. Cambridge University Press. doi:10.1017/9781108943260. ISBN 978-1-108-83784-2. LCCN 2021024626. S2CID 242729962.
- Münzer, Friedrich (1897). "Calpurnius 28" . Realencyclopädie der classischen Altertumswissenschaft (in German). Vol. III, 1. Stuttgart: Butcher. cols. 1368–1370 – via Wikisource.
- Syme, Ronald (1987). "M Bibulus and four sons". Harvard Studies in Classical Philology. 91: 185. doi:10.2307/311404. JSTOR 311404.
- Zmeskal, Klaus (2009). Adfinitas (in German). Vol. 1. Passau: Verlag Karl Stutz. ISBN 978-3-88849-304-1.

=== Ancient sources ===
- Appian (1913) [2nd century AD]. Civil Wars. Loeb Classical Library. Translated by White, Horace. Cambridge – via LacusCurtius.
- Cassius Dio (1914–27) [c. AD 230]. Historia Romana [Roman history]. Loeb Classical Library. Translated by Cary, Earnest – via LacusCurtius. (Nine volumes.)
- Plutarch (1919). "Life of Cato the Younger". Plutarch Lives. Loeb Classical Library. Vol. 8. Translated by Perrin, Bernadotte – via LacusCurtius.
- Plutarch (1917) [2nd century AD]. "Life of Pompey". Parallel Lives. Loeb Classical Library. Vol. 5. Translated by Perrin, Bernadotte. OCLC 40115288 – via LacusCurtius.
- Suetonius (1913–14). "Life of Caesar". Lives of the Twelve Caesars. Loeb Classical Library. Translated by Rolfe, J C. Cambridge: Harvard University Press – via LacusCurtius.

Political offices
Preceded by Q. Caecilius Metellus Celer; Lucius Afranius	Roman consul 59 BC; With: Julius Caesar	Succeeded by L. Calpurnius Piso Caesoninus; Aulus Gabinius
