= Lucius Calpurnius Bibulus =

Roman statesman (died c. 32 B.C.)

Lucius Calpurnius Bibulus (? – died around 32 B.C.) was a Roman statesman. He was the son of the consul Marcus Calpurnius Bibulus.

== Biography ==
Lucius Bibulus was the son of Julius Caesar's implacable enemy Marcus Calpurnius Bibulus. His mother could possibly have been Porcia Catonis (daughter of Cato the Younger), although it is disputed, most likely he was a son by his father's first unknown wife. His two elder brothers were killed in Egypt by some of the soldiery which Aulus Gabinius had left there after having restored Ptolemy Auletes to the throne. His father died in 48 BC from the exhaustion and strain of commanding the republican fleets against Caesar. After Caesar's murder, Lucius chose the side of Marcus Junius Brutus, Porcia's new husband, for whom he fought at the battle of Philippi. After the defeat of Caesar's murderers, he surrendered to Marcus Antonius who later gave him command of his fleet. Bibulus was later made governor of Syria by Augustus and he died around 32 BC. He was also possibly the same Bibulus also wrote a short biography on Brutus which Plutarch used as a source. Although that Bibulus may have been a younger half-brother by Porcia.

He married Domitia Calvina, daughter of Gnaeus Domitius Calvinus and had a daughter named Calpurnia Domitia Calvina with her. She became the mother of Marcus Junius Silanus Torquatus.

== See also ==
- List of Roman governors of Syria
