= Caesar's civil war =

War in the Roman Republic (49–45 BC)

- Part of the crisis of the Roman Republic
- Map of the Roman Republic in the mid-1st century BC
Date	10 January 49 BC – 17 March 45 BC (4 years, 2 months and 1 week)
Location	Hispania, Italia, Graecia, Illyria, Aegyptus, Africa
Result	Caesarian victory

Belligerents
Caesarians; Mauretania	Pompeians; Numidia; Egypt; Pontus

Commanders and leaders
Julius Caesar; Mark Antony; Gaius Scribonius Curio †; Gnaeus Domitius Calvinus; Decimus Junius Brutus; Gaius Trebonius; Gaius Rebilus; Bocchus II; Bogud; Cleopatra VII	Pompey X; Titus Labienus †; Metellus Scipio ‡‡; Cato the Younger ‡‡; Publius Varus †; Lucius Domitius †; Marcus Bibulus #; Lucius Afranius †; Marcus Petreius ‡‡; Juba of Numidia ‡‡; Gnaeus Pompeius †; Sextus Pompey; Ptolemy XIII (executed)

Strength
Early 49 BC: 10 legions	Early 49 BC: 15 legions

Caesar's civil war (49–45 BC) occurred during the late Roman Republic between two factions led by Julius Caesar and Pompey. The main cause of the war was political tensions relating to Caesar's place in the Republic on his expected return to Rome on the expiration of his governorship in Gaul.

Before the war, Caesar had led an invasion of Gaul for almost ten years. A build-up of tensions starting in late 50 BC, with both Caesar and Pompey refusing to back down, led to the outbreak of civil war. Pompey and his allies induced the Senate to demand Caesar give up his provinces and armies in the opening days of 49 BC. Caesar refused and instead marched on Rome.

The war was fought in Italy, Illyria, Greece, Egypt, Africa, and Hispania. The decisive events occurred in 48 BC: Pompey defeated Caesar at the Battle of Dyrrhachium in modern Albania, but the subsequent larger Battle of Pharsalus in Greece was won by Caesar, and Pompey's army disintegrated. Many prominent supporters of Pompey (termed Pompeians) surrendered after the battle, such as Marcus Junius Brutus and Cicero. Others fought on, including Cato the Younger and Metellus Scipio. Pompey fled to Egypt, where he was assassinated upon arrival.

Caesar led a military expedition to Asia Minor before attacking North Africa, where he defeated Metellus Scipio in 46 BC at the Battle of Thapsus. Cato the Younger and Metellus Scipio committed suicide shortly after Caesar's victory. In the following year, Caesar defeated the last of the Pompeians in the Battle of Munda in Spain, who were led by his former lieutenant Titus Labienus. Caesar was then made dictator perpetuo ("dictator in perpetuity" or "dictator for life") by the Senate in 44 BC. He was assassinated by a group of senators (including Brutus) shortly thereafter.

The civil war is one of the commonly recognised endpoints of Rome's republican government. Some scholars view the war as the proximate cause of the republic's fall, due to its polarising interruption of normal republican government. (Note: Morstein-Marx & Rosenstein 2006, p. 628, citing Gruen 1995, p. 504, "civil war caused the fall of the republic, not vice versa".) Caesar's comprehensive victory followed by his immediate death left a power vacuum; over the following years his heir Octavian was eventually able to take complete control, forming the Roman Empire as Augustus.

== Background ==
The main issue in the lead-up to the war was how Caesar, who had been in Gaul for almost ten years before 49 BC, was to be re-integrated into the political fabric of Rome after accumulating immense power and wealth in Gaul.

Starting from 58 BC, the year after his consulship in 59, Caesar had held the proconsulship of Cisalpine Gaul along with Illyricum under the terms of the lex Vatinia and Transalpine Gaul at the assignment of the Senate. Caesar had allied himself with Crassus and Pompey in the so-called First Triumvirate during his consulship. The alliance of three men "induced a sharp restructuring of alliances and alignments" with temporary benefit to them but harm in the long-run with aristocratic groups coalescing in opposition. The short-term benefits to the three emerged from their own purposes: ratification of Pompey's eastern settlement and agrarian measures involving Pompey and Crassus.

The political alliance began to fray in the mid 50s BC, but was put on hold with a renegotiation and the joint consulship of Pompey and Crassus in 55 BC. Their joint consulship assigned new provincial commands to the consuls, with Pompey receiving Hispania while Crassus went to Syria to fight the Parthians; Caesar, for his part, had his proconsulship in Gaul renewed.

After Crassus' departure from Rome at the end of 55 BC and following his death in battle in 53 BC, the alliance started to fracture more cleanly. With the death of Crassus and that of Julia (Caesar's daughter and Pompey's wife) in 54 BC, the balance of power between Pompey and Caesar collapsed and "a faceoff between [the two] may, therefore, have seemed inevitable". From 61 BC, the main political fault line in Rome was counterbalancing against the influence of Pompey, leading to his seeking allies outside the core senatorial aristocracy, i.e. Crassus and Caesar; but the rise of anarchic political violence from 55 to 52 BC finally forced the Senate to ally with Pompey to restore order. The breakdown of order in 53 and 52 BC was extremely disturbing; men like Publius Clodius Pulcher and Titus Annius Milo were "essentially independent agents" leading large violent street gangs in a highly volatile political environment. This led to Pompey's sole consulship in 52 BC in which he took sole control of the city without convening an electoral assembly.

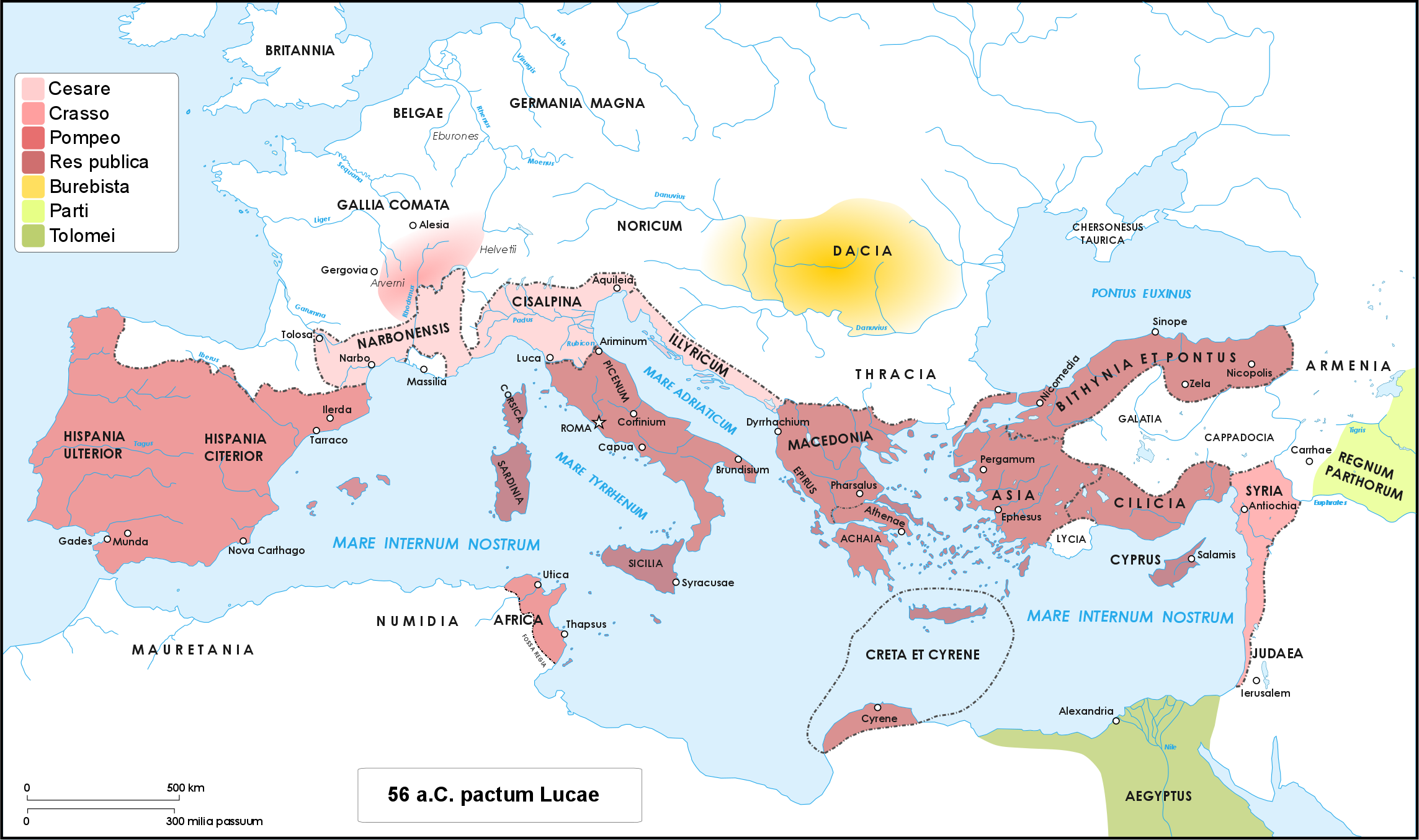
Roman world in 56 BC, when Caesar, Crassus and Pompey met at Luca for a conference in which they decided to add another five years to the proconsulship of Caesar in Gaul and to give the province of Syria to Crassus and both Spanish provinces and Africa to Pompey.

Political agitation to strip Caesar of his command and his legions had already started in the spring of 51 BC: M Claudius Marcellus argued in that year that the capture of Alesia and victory over Vercingetorix meant that Caesar's provincia (i.e., task) in Gaul was completed and therefore his command had lapsed. He also argued that Caesar's expected desire to stand for a second consulship in absentia was no longer justified after his victory. Regardless, the Senate rejected Marcellus' motion, as well as his later motion to declare Caesar's term in Gaul to end on 1 March 50 BC. Pompey was also instrumental in rejecting the proposed motions.

After the summer of 50, "positions had been hardened and events progressed irreversibly toward cataclysm", with Pompey now rejecting Caesar's standing for a second consulship until he gave up his army and provinces. The Senate as a whole was relatively pacific, strongly supporting a proposal by Caesar's ally C Scribonius Curio, who was then tribune of the plebs, that both Pompey and Caesar give up their armies and commands. The proposal passed in the Senate by 370 to 22 on 1 December 50 BC, but it was rejected by Pompey and the consul. The consul, C Claudius Marcellus, then seized upon rumours that Caesar was preparing to invade Italy and charged Pompey with defending the city and the Republic.

One of the reasons given as to why Caesar decided to go to war was that he would be prosecuted for legal irregularities during his consulship in 59 BC and violations of various laws passed by Pompey in the late 50s, the consequence of which would be ignominious exile. However, the prosecution theory emerging from Suetonious and Pollio is in "highly dubious territory" and "dubious in the extreme". There is no evidence from the period 50–49 BC that anyone was seriously planning on putting Caesar on trial. Caesar's choice to fight the civil war was motivated by his mostly stumbling in efforts to attain a second consulship and triumph, in which failure to do so would have jeopardised his political future. Moreover, war in 49 BC was advantageous for Caesar, who had continued military preparations while Pompey and the republicans had barely started preparing.

Even in ancient times, the causes of the war were puzzling and perplexing, with specific motives "nowhere to be found". Various pretexts existed, such as Caesar's claim that he was defending the rights of tribunes after they fled the city, which was "too obvious a sham". Caesar's own explanation was that he would protect his personal dignitas; both Caesar and Pompey were impelled by pride, with Caesar refusing to "yield submissively to the blusterings of the conservatives, much less to the bullying of Pompey" in Gruen's words, and Pompey similarly refusing to accept Caesar's proposals, delivered as if they were directives. There was little conscious desire for war until the last weeks of 50 BC, but "the boni had entrapped themselves... in a political vise from which they could not emerge with dignity except by aggressive self-assertion" while Caesar could not "permit [his status and reputation] to collapse through submission".

== Civil war ==
For the months leading up to January 49 BC, both Caesar and the anti-Caesarians (composed of Pompey, Cato, and others) seemed to believe that the other would back down or, failing that, offer acceptable terms. Trust had eroded between the two over the last few years and repeated cycles of brinksmanship harmed chances for compromise.

On 1 January 49 BC, Caesar stated that he would be willing to resign if other commanders would also do so but, in Gruen's words, "would not endure any disparity in their [Caesar and Pompey's] forces", appearing to threaten war if his terms were not met. Caesar's representatives in the city met with senatorial leaders with a more conciliatory message, with Caesar willing to give up Transalpine Gaul if he would be permitted to keep two legions and the right to stand for consul without giving up his imperium (and, thus, right to triumph), but these terms were rejected by Cato, who declared he would not agree to anything unless it was presented publicly before the Senate.

The Senate was persuaded on the eve of war (7 January 49 BC) – while Pompey and Caesar continued to muster troops – to demand Caesar give up his post or be judged an enemy of the state. A few days later, the Senate then also stripped Caesar of his permission to stand for election in absentia and appointed a successor to Caesar's proconsulship in Gaul; while pro-Caesarian tribunes vetoed these proposals, the Senate ignored it and moved the senatus consultum ultimum, empowering the magistrates to take whatever actions were necessary to ensure the safety of the state. In response, a number of those pro-Caesarian tribunes, dramatising their plight, fled the city for Caesar's camp.

=== Opening of the war ===
==== Crossing the Rubicon ====
On the 10th or 11 January, Caesar crossed the Rubicon, a small river marking the boundary between the province of Cisalpine Gaul to the north and Italy proper to the south. Crossing the Rubicon, Suetonius claims Caesar exclaimed alea iacta est ("the die is cast"), though Plutarch maintains Caesar spoke in Greek quoting the poet Menander with anerriphtho kubos ("ἀνερρίφθω κύβος", "let the die be thrown"); Caesar's own commentaries do not mention the Rubicon at all. This marked a formal start to hostilities, with Caesar being "undoubtedly a rebel".

On both sides, the rank and file soldiers followed their leaders: "the Gallic legions obeyed their patron and benefactor [who] deserved well of the res publica... others followed Pompey and the consuls [who] represented the res publica". Caesar made sure to address his men: according to his own account, he spoke of injustices done to him by his political enemies, how Pompey had betrayed him, and focused mostly on how the rights of tribunes had been trampled by the Senate's ignoring tribunician vetoes, parading the tribunes who had fled the city before the troops in their disguises. On the senatus consultum ultimum, Caesar argued it was unnecessary and should be confined only to circumstances in which Rome was under direct threat.

For most Romans, the choice of which side to pick was difficult. Only a small number of people were committed to one side or the other at the onset of hostilities. For example, Gaius Claudius Marcellus, who as consul in 50 BC had charged Pompey with defending the city, chose neutrality. The then-young Marcus Junius Brutus, whose father had been treacherously killed by Pompey during Brutus' childhood, whose mother was Caesar's lover, and who had been raised in Cato the Younger's house, chose to leave the city, setting off a post in Cilicia and thence to Pompey's camp. Caesar's most trusted lieutenant in Gaul, Titus Labienus, also defected from Caesar to Pompey, possibly due to Caesar's hoarding of military glories or an earlier loyalty to Pompey.

==== March on Rome ====
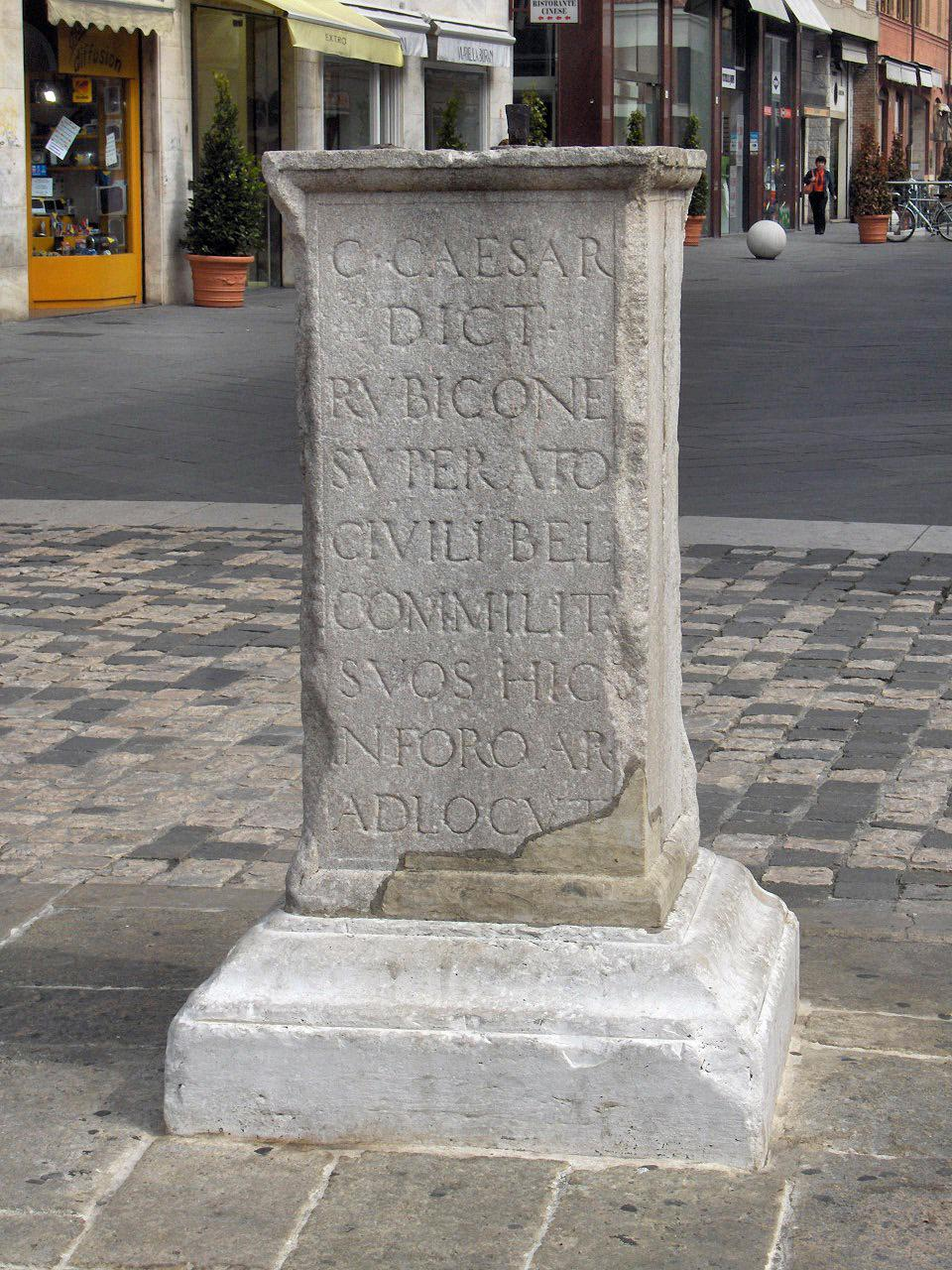
Renaissance inscription claiming to have been erected by Julius Caesar at the spot where he addressed his army after crossing the Rubicon. Rimini, Italy.

Caesar's timing was far-sighted: Italy was totally unprepared for an invasion. Caesar captured Ariminum (modern day Rimini) without resistance, his men having already infiltrated the city; he captured three more cities in quick succession. News of Caesar's incursion into Italy reached Rome around 17 January. In response Pompey "issued an edict in which he recognised a state of civil war, ordered all the senators to follow him, [and] declared that he would regard as a partisan of Caesar any one who remained behind". Pompey and his allies left the city along with many uncommitted senators, fearing bloody reprisals of the previous civil wars; other senators simply left Rome for their country villas, hoping to keep a low profile.

In late January, Caesar and Pompey were negotiating, with Caesar proposing that the two of them return to their provinces (which would have required Pompey to travel to Spain) and then disband their forces. Pompey accepted those terms provided that they withdraw from Italy at once and submit to arbitration of the dispute by the Senate, a counter-offer that Caesar rejected as doing so would have put him at the mercy of hostile senators while giving up all the advantages of his surprise invasion. Caesar continued to advance.

After encountering five cohorts under Quintus Minucius Thermus at Iguvium, Thermus' forces deserted. Caesar quickly overran Picenum, the area from which Pompey's family originated. While Caesar's troops skirmished once with local forces, fortunately for him, the population was not hostile: his troops were refraining from looting and his opponents had "little popular appeal". In February 49 BC, Caesar received reinforcements and captured Asculum when the local garrison deserted.

Only when he reached Corfinium did he encounter serious opposition led by Lucius Domitius Ahenobarbus, recently appointed governor of Gaul by the Senate. Pompey had urged Ahenobarbus to retreat south and join him, but Ahenobarbus had responded with requests for support; regardless, Caesar prepared for a siege. After Ahenobarbus received a letter from Pompey denying support, he claimed help was on the way but was caught planning a personal escape; in response, his men arrested him and sent envoys to surrender to Caesar after a short week-long siege. Among the surrendered were some fifty senators and equestrians, all of whom Caesar allowed to go free. When Corfinium's local magistrates handed over some six million sestertii that Ahenobarbus had brought to pay his men, Caesar returned it to the men and asked them to take an oath of loyalty, which they did.

Caesar's advance down the Adriatic coast was surprisingly clement and disciplined: his soldiers did not plunder the countryside as soldiers had during the Social War a few decades earlier. Nor did Caesar avenge himself on his political enemies as Sulla and Marius had. The policy of clemency was also highly practical: Caesar's pacificity prevented the population of Italy from turning on him. At the same time, Pompey planned to escape east to Greece where he could raise a massive army from the eastern provinces. He therefore escaped to Brundisium (modern Brindisi), requisitioning merchant vessels to travel the Adriatic.

Caesar pursued Pompey to Brundisium, arriving on 9 March with six legions. By then, most of Pompey's forces had departed, with a rearguard of two legions waiting for transport. While Caesar tried to block the harbour with earthworks and reopen negotiations, the earthworks were unsuccessful and Pompey refused to negotiate, escaping east with almost all of his men and all the ships in the region.

=== Spain and Africa ===
Following this setback and taking advantage of Pompey's escape east, Caesar marched west to Hispania. While in Italy, he assembled a meeting of the rump Senate on 1 April; the turnout was poor. There, Caesar repeated his grievances and requested senatorial envoys be sent to negotiate with Pompey; though the motion was passed, nobody volunteered. A meeting of the concilium plebis also was called; although Caesar promised every citizen a gift of 300 sestertii and a guarantee of the grain supply, the reception was muted. When one of the tribunes, Lucius Caecilius Metellus, interposed his veto against Caesar's attempt to raid the state treasury, Caesar threatened Metellus' life until he gave way. Some scholars view the episode as showing the disingenuousness of Caesar's championing of tribunician rights at the start of the civil war. The raid captured some 15 thousand gold bars, 30 thousand silver bars, and 30 million sestertii. The episode was sufficiently embarrassing that it was omitted from Caesar's Commentaries on the civil war.

Leaving Mark Antony in charge of Italy and the praetor Lepidus in Rome, Caesar set out west for Spain resentful for the embarrassing episodes before the senate and Metellus. En route, he started a siege of Massilia when the city barred him entry and came under the command of the aforementioned Domitius Ahenobarbus. Leaving a besieging force, Caesar continued to Spain with a small bodyguard and 900 German auxiliary cavalry. He arrived in June 49 and at Ilerda he defeated a Pompeian army under legates Lucius Afranius and Marcus Petreius. Pompey's remaining legate in Spain, Marcus Terentius Varro, surrendered shortly thereafter, putting all of Spain under Caesar's control.

Concurrent to Caesar's invasion of Spain, he sent his lieutenant Curio to invade Sicily and Africa assisted by Gaius Caninius Rebilus, where his forces were decisively defeated in the Battle of the Bagradas River in August 49 BC. Curio was killed in battle.

Returning to Rome in December 49 BC, Caesar left Quintus Cassius Longinus in command of Spain and had praetor Marcus Aemilius Lepidus appoint him dictator. As dictator, he conducted elections for the consulship of 48 BC before using the dictatorial powers to pass laws recalling from exile those condemned by Pompey's courts in 52 BC, excepting Titus Annius Milo, and restoring the political rights of the children of victims of the Sullan proscriptions. Holding the dictatorship would have been the only way to avoid giving up his imperium, legions, provincia, and right to triumph while within the pomerium. Standing in the same elections he conducted, he won a second term as consul with Publius Servilius Vatia Isauricus as his colleague. He resigned the dictatorship after eleven days. Caesar then renewed his pursuit of Pompey across the Adriatic.

=== Macedonian campaign ===
Arriving at Brundisium, Caesar did not have enough transports to sail his entire force, meaning that multiple voyages across the Adriatic would be needed; this was complicated by a Pompeian fleet stationed on the eastern side of the Adriatic under the command of Marcus Calpurnius Bibulus. Sailing on 4 January 48 BC – in reality, due to drift from the Roman calendar, late autumn – Caesar took the Pompeians by surprise, with Pompey's troops dispersed to winter quarters and Bibulus' fleet not ready. Bibulus' fleet, however, quickly sprung into action and captured some of Caesar's transports as they returned to Brundisium, leaving Caesar stranded with some seven legions and little food. Caesar then pushed to Apollonia with little local resistance, allowing him to secure a base and some food stores; seeing that the main Pompeian supply base was at Dyrrachium, Caesar advanced on it but withdrew when Pompey arrived first with superior forces.

After receiving the remainder of his army from Italy under Mark Antony on 10 April, Caesar advanced against Dyrrachium again, leading to the Battle of Dyrrachium. After attempting circumvallation of the Pompeian defenders, Caesar attempted to capture the vital Pompeian logistics hub of Dyrrachium but was unsuccessful after Pompey occupied it and the surrounding heights. In response, Caesar besieged Pompey's camp and constructed a circumvallation thereof, until, after months of skirmishes, Pompey was able to break through Caesar's fortified lines and force Caesar into a strategic withdrawal for Thessaly.

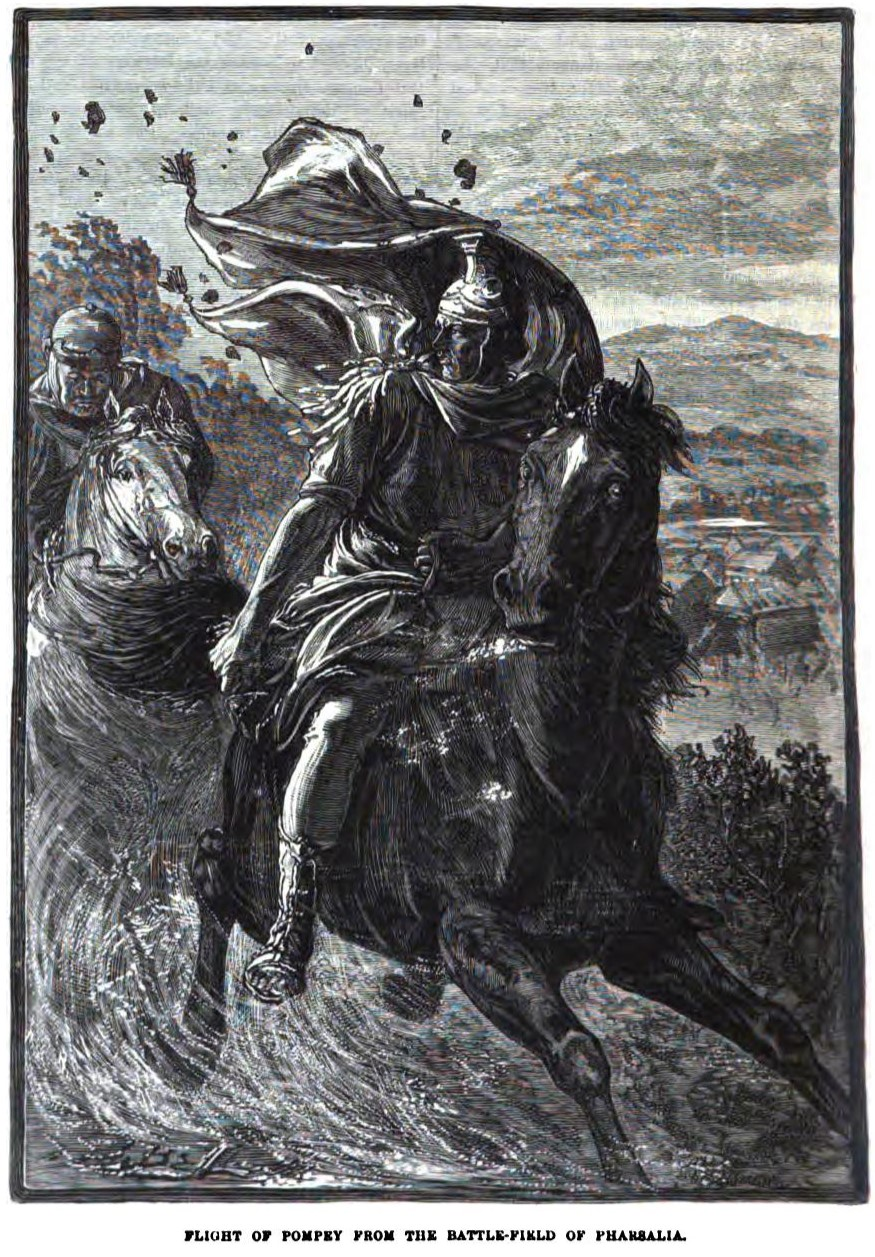
Pompey flees from Pharsalus, as imagined by a 1882 drawing

After Dyrrachium, seeking to spare Italy from invasion, prevent Caesar from defeating in detail Metellus Scipio's forces arriving from Syria, and under pressure from his overconfident allies who accused him of prolonging the war to extend his command, Pompey sought to engage Caesar in a decisive battle. After meeting up with Scipio's reinforcement, Pompey led his forces after Caesar in early August, seeking favourable ground for a battle. After several days of cavalry skirmishes, Caesar was able to lure Pompey off of a hill and force battle on the plain of Pharsalus. During the battle, a flanking manoeuvre led by Labienus failed against a reserve line of Caesar's troops, leading to the collapse of the Pompeian infantry against Caesar's veterans and victory for Caesar. Shortly after the battle and sometime in October, Caesar was named dictator for the second time, this time for an entire year.

Pompey, despairing of the defeat, fled with his advisors overseas to Mytilene and thence to Cilicia where he held a council of war; at the same time, Cato's supporters regrouped at Corcyra and went thence to Libya. Others, including Marcus Junius Brutus, sought Caesar's pardon, travelling over marshlands to Larissa where he was then welcomed graciously by Caesar in his camp. Pompey's council of war decided to flee to Egypt, which had in the previous year supplied him with military aid.

=== Egyptian dynastic struggle ===
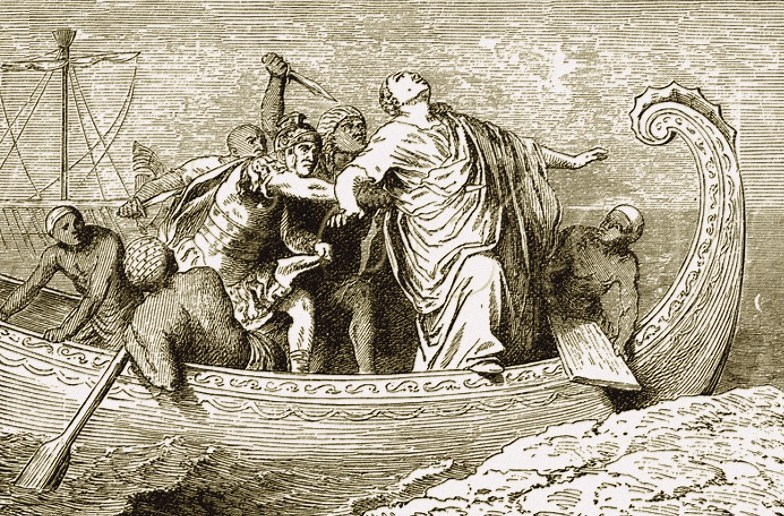
Pompey is murdered in Egypt, as imagined by a 1880 drawing

When Pompey arrived in Egypt, he was greeted by a delegation of several Egyptians and two Roman officers who had served with him years before. Shortly after boarding their boat, he was murdered in sight of his wife and friends on the deck. Caesar pursued vigorously as Pompey's skill and client networks made him the largest threat, travelling first to Asia and then to Cyprus and Egypt. He arrived three days after Pompey's murder. There, he was presented with the head of Pompey along with his signet ring; Caesar wept when he saw the ring and recoiled from the head, though the genuineness of his reaction has been debated.

Egypt by this time had been embroiled in repeated civil wars, also frequently arbitrated by Rome – helped in part due to the massive bribes Egyptian monarchs gave to Roman leaders – which eroded the realm's independence. While in Egypt, Caesar started to get involved in a dynastic dispute between Ptolemy XIII and Cleopatra, who in the will (registered in Rome) of the previous Egyptian king (Ptolemy XII Auletes) had been made co-rulers. By 48 BC, relations between the two co-rulers had broken down, with the two shadowing each other with armies on opposite sides of the Nile.

Caesar demanded some ten million denarii towards repayment of a large loan contracted by the previous monarch, Ptolemy Auletes. The demand was almost certainly motivated by his need to pay his troops; he also declared that he would arbitrate the succession dispute between Ptolemy XIII and Cleopatra. In response, Pothinus (Ptolemy XIII's eunuch regent), apparently summoned an army to the city and besieged Caesar's occupation of the royal quarter; Caesar summoned reinforcements from Roman Asia.

While under siege in Alexandria, Caesar met Cleopatra and became her lover when she secreted herself into the royal quarter. Around this time, Caesar also produced his decision on the dynastic dispute: the will's terms were clear and both would have to be co-rulers. Ptolemy XIII strenuously objected to this decision, probably already aware of Caesar's relationship with Cleopatra. After some months of siege, Caesar's forces were relieved by forces under Mithridates of Pergamum from Syria and Caesar then brought the Egyptians to battle. The Egyptians were utterly routed, with Ptolemy XIII drowning as his boat capsized during the flight.

After the victory, Caesar gave the Roman province of Cyprus to Egypt, likely secured payment of his financial demand, and invested Cleopatra (along with a new co-ruler Ptolemy XIV Philopator, Cleopatra's younger brother) with rule of Egypt. While Caesar's Alexandrian War implies he left Egypt forthwith, he actually stayed for some three months cruising with Cleopatra along the Nile, mostly to rest and perhaps also partly to make clear Rome's support for Cleopatra's new regime.

News of a crisis in Asia persuaded Caesar to leave Egypt in the middle of 47 BC, at which time sources suggest Cleopatra was already pregnant. He left behind three legions to secure Cleopatra's rule. Cleopatra likely bore a child, which she called "Ptolemy Caesar" and which the Alexandrians called "Caesarion", in late June. Caesar believed that the child was his, as he allowed use of the name.

=== War against Pharnaces ===
Aware of the civil war, Pharnaces II desired to reclaim his father's lands lost during the Third Mithridatic War and promptly invaded large parts of Cappadocia, Armenia, eastern Pontus, and Lesser Colchis. Roman sources paint him cruelly, ordering the castration of any captured Romans; these attacks were uncontested after Pompey stripped the east for troops until Caesar's legate Gnaeus Domitius Calvinus fought him unsuccessfully near Nicopolis in December 48 BC with an inexperienced force.

Caesar moved from Egypt north along the eastern Mediterranean coast, moving directly for Pharnaces' invasion, seeking to protect his prestige, which would suffer substantially if a foreign invasion were to go unpunished. Pharnaces attempted to treat with Caesar, who rejected all negotiations, reminding him of his treatment of Roman prisoners. Caesar demanded him to withdraw immediately from all occupied territories, return their spoils, and release all prisoners.

When the Romans arrived near the hilltop town of Zela, Pharnaces launched an all-out attack as the Romans were entrenching. The attack caused confusion among Caesar's forces but they quickly recovered and drove Pharnaces' forces down the hill. After a breakthrough on the Caesarian right, Pharnaces' army routed. He fled back to his kingdom but was promptly assassinated. The whole campaign had taken just a few weeks. Caesar's victory was so swift that in a letter to a friend in Rome, he quipped "Veni, vidi, vici" ("I came, I saw, I conquered"), a tag repeated on placards carried in his Pontic triumph; he also mocked Pompey for making his name fighting such weak enemies.

=== Brief return to Rome and mutiny ===
At Rome, however, during these Egyptian and Pontic campaigns, politics continued. Publius Cornelius Dolabella was serving as one of the tribunes for 47 BC. During his term, he proposed the abolition of all debts and a rent holiday. This led Antony, who was serving as Caesar's magister equitum in the dictatorship, to intervene against the proposals. When Antony had left for Campania to deal with a mutiny in Caesar's Ninth and Tenth legions, domestic violence again flared up in Rome, leading the Senate to invoke the senatus consultum ultimum but the lack of any magistrates with imperium present meant that nobody was able to enforce it; only after some time did Antony return, restoring order with serious loss of life, dealing a serious blow to his popularity.

At the same time, Cato led his forces from Cyrenaica across the desert to Africa (modern day Tunisia), linking up with Metellus Scipio; they, along with Labienus, induced the defection of one of Caesar's governors in Hispania Ulterior.

Caesar returned to Italy and Rome late in 47 BC, meeting and pardoning Cicero, who had given up hope in Pompeian victory after Pompey's death, at Brundisium. Upon his return, he made it clear that his confidence in Antony had been lost. Caesar elected suffect magistrates for 47 and magistrates for the new year (46 BC); he packed his men into the priestly colleges and the magistracies, expanding the number of praetors from eight to ten, to reward them for their loyalty. For himself, he declined to continue the dictatorship, instead taking the consulship with Lepidus as his colleague.

The mutineers in Campania were not calmed by Caesar's return. Caesar sent one of his lieutenants, the future historian Gaius Sallustius Crispus (also made praetor for 46 BC), to parley with the men, but Sallust was almost killed by a mob. Caesar then went in person to the troops, who were then nearing Rome under arms; he granted them immediate discharges, gave promises that they would receive their land and retirement bonuses, and addressed them as quirites (citizens). His men, shocked by their casual dismissal, begged Caesar to take them back into service; feigning reluctance, he allowed himself to be persuaded and made notes to put the mutiny's leaders in exposed and dangerous positions in the upcoming campaign.

While in Italy, he also confiscated and sold at market price the property of Pompey and opponents now dead or still unpardoned, before also borrowing more funds. He handled Dolabella's proposed debt cancellation proposals by declining to take them up, arguing his large debts would have made him the chief beneficiary of such a plan. The decision to sell the confiscated properties at market price disappointed some of Caesar's allies, who sought to pick them up at a bargain, but also indicated his great need for funds.

=== African campaign ===
Caesar ordered his men to gather in Lilybaeum on Sicily in late December. He placed a minor member of the Scipio family – one Scipio Salvito or Salutio – on this staff because of the myth that no Scipio could be defeated in Africa. He assembled six legions there and set out for Africa on 25 December 47 BC. The transit was disrupted by a storm and strong winds; only around 3,500 legionaries and 150 cavalry landed with him near the enemy port of Hadrumentum. Apocryphally, when landing, Caesar tripped and fell onto the beach but was able to laugh the bad omen off when he grabbed two handfuls of sand, declaring "I have hold of you, Africa!"

==== Ruspina ====
At the start of the campaign, Caesar's forces were greatly outnumbered: Metellus Scipio led a force of ten legions (probably understrength like Caesar's legions) and large contingents of allied cavalry under King Juba I of Numidia, who also led some 120 war elephants. With the benefit of surprise, Caesar had the time needed to find and reorganise his scattered forces, also sending orders to Sicily to send reinforcements. As the Pompeians had already acquired most of the available food supplies, Caesar had to move quickly. He bypassed Hadrumentum after it refused to surrender and established bases at Ruspina, where he led a large foraging party in an encounter battle forces under Labienus. Caesar's inexperienced troops wavered under attack from Numidian skirmisher cavalry for most of the day before retreating after a counterattack, resulting in a strategic defeat, as Caesar was prevented from foraging.

Low on supplies, Caesar fortified his camp at Ruspina as Metellus Scipio joined Labienus' forces just three miles from Caesar's position. Their ally, King Juba, moved to link up as well, but was forced to redeploy west when his kingdom was invaded by his rival, Bocchus II of Mauretania. This was a lucky break for Caesar, who had not arranged for it. Scipio's forces suffered from endemic desertion; Caesar meanwhile took a defensive approach until he was reinforced by two legions, 800 Gallic cavalrymen, and substantial stores of food, at which point he retook the offensive.

After some skirmishing between Caesar and Metellus Scipio over some hills on the outskirts of town and the Pompeian water source at Uzitta, Metellus Scipio was reinforced by Juba's allied cavalry and heavy infantry. Following more skirmishing for terrain advantages around Uzitta, Caesar's forces were again reinforced by the veteran legions who had mutinied in Campania. Running low on supplies and with little chance of taking Uzitta, Caesar decided to march away, seizing some food stores before advancing on and besieging Thapsus.

==== Thapsus and return ====
Metellus followed Caesar and the two forces eventually faced off along a narrow front, limiting Metellus Scipio's numerical advantage. Caesar went to address his men, but they spontaneously attack, taking Metellus' by surprise and quickly routing them. Plutarch, however, reports that Caesar felt an oncoming epileptic fit and was taken to rest, leading to the confused attack. Either way, Metellus Scipio's forces were routed, with overwhelmingly unequal casualties: some 10,000 dead Pompeians for around 50 casualties. Metellus Scipio and the rest of the Pompeian leadership was able, however, to escape, though most would end up dead in weeks, either from suicide or execution following capture: Metellus Scipio attempted escape by sea but killed himself when intercepted by Caesarian ships; Juba and a Pompeian officer named Marcus Petreius arranged a suicide pact by single combat. Labienus was able to escape, making his way to Spain, where he joined Gnaeus and Sextus Pompey.

During the campaign before Thapsus, Cato the Younger held the city of Utica and was absent at the battle; when he was informed of the defeat, he consulted with his soldiers, who numbered but three hundred and were hopelessly outnumbered. After dinner, Cato took his sword and stabbed himself in the stomach; at the noise, a doctor was summoned, but Cato ripped the stitches open, dying before anyone could stop him. Caesar was disappointed he would not be able to pardon Cato, who had killed himself seemingly to prevent himself from being so pardoned. Caesar then remained in Africa to settle affairs in the region, subjecting communities which had supported Pompey to punitive fines. He also engaged in a brief affair with Eunoë, the wife of King Bogud of Mauretania. In June 46, he left Africa for Rome, stopping first in Sardinia, and returning to the city near the end of July.

=== Second Spanish campaign and end ===
Caesar's campaign to Munda

After Caesar's return to Rome, he celebrated four triumphs: over Gaul, Egypt, Asia, and Africa. The victory over fellow Romans in Africa was reframed, for public opinion, into a victory over Juba's Numidia. The celebrations began on 21 September and ran until 2 October, with lavish parades of prisoners and looted treasures. Caesar, as triumphator, also celebrated the occasion by appointing to himself the right to be preceded by seventy-two lictors – far beyond the consul's normal twelve and dictator's normal twenty-four – symbolising his having held the dictatorship three times. Massive games and public banquets were also held; Caesar also gave huge donatives to his men, equivalent to more than sixteen years pay, with even more for centurions and officers. Caesar however received bad news about a rebellion in Spain and left shortly after the festivities to suppress it.

The main source for the campaign in Spain is known as the Spanish War (or Bellum Hispaniense) is somewhat deficient and was probably written by one of Caesar's officers. Elizabeth Rawson, in the Cambridge Ancient History, describes a "clumsy narrator". Other criticism is directed to writing: its "half-educated Latin", its status as "the most illiterate and exasperating book in classical literature", with "a very miserable style" and "bad imitations of Caesar's lucidity".

==== Early campaign ====
Caesar left for Spain in November 46 BC. His appointment of Quintus Cassius Longinus after his first campaign in Spain had led to a rebellion; Cassius' greed and mismanagement led to many of the Spanish communities openly defecting to the Pompeians, rallied by Pompey's sons Gnaeus and Sextus. The Pompeians there were joined by other refugees from Thapsus, including Labienus.

After receiving bad news from the peninsula, he left with a single experienced legion, as many of his veterans had been discharged, and put Italy in the hands of his new magister equitum Lepidus. He led eight legions in total, which gave rise to fears that he might be defeated by Gnaeus Pompey's formidable force of more than thirteen legions and further auxiliaries. The Spanish campaign was replete with atrocities, with Caesar treating his enemies as rebels; Caesar's men adorned their fortifications with severed heads and massacred enemy soldiers.

Caesar first arrived in Spain and relieved Ulia from siege. He then marched against Corduba, garrisoned by Sextus Pompey, who requested reinforcements from his brother Gnaeus. Gnaeus at first refused battle at Labienus' advice, forcing Caesar into a winter siege of the city, which was eventually called off after little progress; Caesar then moved to besiege Ategua, shadowed by Gnaeus' army. Substantial desertions, however, started to take their toll on the Pompeian forces: Ategua surrendered on 19 February 45 BC, after its Pompeian commander massacred suspected defectors and their families on the walls. Gnaeus Pompey's forces retreated from Ategua afterwards, with Caesar following.

==== Munda ====
Desertions forced Gnaeus Pompey to give battle on a ridge near Munda. Caesar, seeking a decisive outcome, joined battle, having his men march up the ridge to engage the Pompeians in a bitter struggle; Caesar's forces wavered, with Caesar rushing to the front lines to rally his men in person.

When Caesar's Tenth legion (on his right) broke through the Pompeian line, Labienus took a legion to plug the gap. However, the flank was already being routed by Caesarian cavalry, which drove the entire Pompeian force into a rout. The fighting was sufficiently fierce that Plutarch relates Caesar told his friends "he had often striven for victory, but now first for his life". Suetonius claims that Caesar considered suicide in despair. Caesar suffered around a thousand fatalities, "a high proportion from an army that is unlikely to have numbered much more than 25,000–30,000 men".

Labienus was killed on the field; Gnaeus Pompey escaped, but was captured and beheaded shortly thereafter. While Sextus Pompey was able to flee into hiding and there was a small revolt on the other side of the Mediterranean in Syria under Quintus Caecilius Bassus which persisted, the civil war was over.

==== Return ====
The victory prompted Caesar's Senate in Rome to declare fifty days of thanksgiving, to give Caesar the title "Liberator", and to dedicate a temple to Liberty. Further honours were granted in the coming months by the sycophantic Senate, including the right to sit on a special chair between the consuls in the Senate and placement of an ivory statue of Caesar on the capitol near the kings and in the temple to Quirinus. The month of his birthday, Quinctilis, was renamed in his honour (eventually becoming modern July); a temple to his clemency was established, he was given the permanent title imperator, and the title parens patriae (father of his country).

After the conquests first of Pompey and then of Caesar, the republic's territories had expanded considerably by 44 BC. The portion in yellow near Africa was annexed by Caesar. Cyprus (annexed in consequence of Pompey's conquests) also was, pursuant to Caesar's eastern settlements, returned to the Ptolemies.

Caesar returned to Rome via southern Gaul and Narbo Martius. During his return, he set up a number of colonies for his veterans, rewarded his soldiers and supporters, and granted Latin rights to various Gallic towns. He also met and reconciled with Mark Antony. While in Cisalpine Gaul, he also promised Marcus Junius Brutus the praetorship for 44 BC and possibly a consulship in 41.

He returned to Rome about a year after he left in October 45 BC, celebrating a triumph over fellow citizens, leaving something of a bad impression. He also permitted two of his legates, Quintus Pedius and Quintus Fabius Maximus, to hold triumphs as well. None of these celebrations were popular with critics in the Senate. Nor was Caesar's devaluing of the consulship and other offices in the name of political favours: for example, on the last day of the year, the consul died, leading Caesar to convene an election to make one of his allies, Gaius Caninius Rebilus, consul for a few hours in the afternoon, leading Cicero to write to a friend "if you could see it, you would weep".

Caesar, on his part, started planning an ambitious campaign into Dacia and Parthia upon his return.

== Aftermath ==
Caesar's appointment during the civil war to the dictatorship, first temporarily – then permanently in early 44 BC – along with his de facto and likely indefinite semi-divine monarchical rule, led to a conspiracy which was successful in assassinating him on the Ides of March in 44 BC, three days before Caesar went east to Parthia. Among the conspirators were many Caesarian officers who had rendered excellent service during the civil wars, as well as men pardoned by Caesar.

Some scholars, such as Erich Gruen, view Caesar's civil war as the inciting event for the collapse of the republic. From this perspective, the civil war – triggered by miscalculation rather than design – caused the collapse of the republic by setting into motion a long-term disruption of functioning republican political culture. Others view the civil war as a symptom of the republic's collapse, either in terms of the republic's alienation of various interest groups (per Peter Brunt) or in terms of a prolonged political "crisis without alternative" where republican institutions were unable to effect needed reform from within while also being of such stature that no alternatives were seriously considered (per Christian Meier).

== Bibliography ==
=== Modern sources ===
- Batstone, William Wendell; Damon, Cynthia (2006). Caesar's Civil War. Oxford: Oxford University Press. ISBN 978-0-1980-3697-5. OCLC 78210756.
- Beard, Mary (2015). SPQR: a history of ancient Rome (1st ed.). New York. ISBN 978-0-8714-0423-7. OCLC 902661394.
- Breed, Brian W; Damon, Cynthia; Rossi, Andreola, eds. (2010). Citizens of discord: Rome and its civil wars. Oxford: Oxford University Press. ISBN 978-0-1953-8957-9. OCLC 456729699.
- Broughton, Thomas Robert Shannon (1952). The magistrates of the Roman republic. Vol. 2. American Philological Association.
- Brunt, P A (1971). Italian Manpower 225 BC – AD 14. Oxford: Clarendon Press. ISBN 0-1981-4283-8.
- Drogula, Fred K (2015). Commanders and Command in the Roman Republic and Early Empire. University of North Carolina Press Books. ISBN 978-1-4696-2127-2.
- Ehrhardt, C T H R (1995). "Crossing the Rubicon". Antichthon. 29: 30–41. doi:10.1017/S0066477400000927. ISSN 0066-4774. S2CID 142429003.
- Mackay, Christopher S (2009). The breakdown of the Roman republic. Cambridge: Cambridge University Press. ISBN 978-0-521-51819-2.
- Meier, Christian (1995) [First published, in German by Severin und Siedler, 1982]. Caesar. Translated by McLintock, David. Basic Books. ISBN 0-465-00895-X.
- Morstein-Marx, Robert (2021). Julius Caesar and the Roman People. Cambridge University Press. doi:10.1017/9781108943260. ISBN 978-1-108-83784-2. LCCN 2021024626. S2CID 242729962.
- Millar, Fergus (1998). The Crowd in Rome in the Late Republic. Ann Arbor: University of Michigan Press. doi:10.3998/mpub.15678. ISBN 978-0-4721-0892-3.
- Flower, Harriet I (2010). Roman republics. Princeton: Princeton University Press. ISBN 978-0-6911-4043-8. OCLC 301798480.
- Gruen, Erich S (1995). Last Generation of the Roman Republic. ISBN 0-5200-2238-6. OCLC 943848.
- Gelzer, Matthias (1968). Caesar: Politician and Statesman. Harvard University Press. ISBN 978-0-6740-9001-9.
- Goldsworthy, Adrian (2002). Caesar's Civil War: 49–44 BC. Oxford: Osprey Publishing. ISBN 1-8417-6392-6.
- Goldsworthy, Adrian (2006). Caesar: Life of a Colossus. Yale University Press. ISBN 978-0-3001-2048-6.
- Rawson, Elizabeth (1992). "Caesar: civil war and dictatorship". In Crook, John; Lintott, Andrew; Rawson, Elizabeth (eds.). The last age of the Roman republic. The Cambridge ancient history. Vol. 9 (2nd ed.). Cambridge University Press. ISBN 0-5218-5073-8. OCLC 121060.
- Morstein-Marx, Robert; Rosenstein, NS (2006). "Transformation of the Roman republic". In Rosenstein, NS; Morstein-Marx, R (eds.). A companion to the Roman Republic. Blackwell. pp. 625ff. ISBN 978-1-4051-7203-5. OCLC 86070041.
- Morstein-Marx, Robert (2007). "Caesar's Alleged Fear of Prosecution and His "Ratio Absentis" in the Approach to the Civil War". Historia: Zeitschrift für Alte Geschichte. 56 (2): 159–178. doi:10.25162/historia-2007-0013. ISSN 0018-2311. JSTOR 25598386. S2CID 159090397.
- Rafferty, David (2015). "The Fall of the Roman Republic" (PDF). Iris. 28: 58–69.
- Tempest, Kathryn (2017). Brutus: the noble conspirator. ISBN 978-0-3001-8009-1. OCLC 982651923.

=== Primary sources ===
- Caesar (1917) [1st century BC]. Gallic War. Loeb Classical Library. Translated by Edwards, Henry John. Harvard University Press. ISBN 978-0-6749-9080-7 – via LacusCurtius.
- Caesar (1859) [1st century BC]. Commentarii de Bello Civili . Harper's New Classical Library. Translated by McDevitte, WA; Bohn, WS. New York: Harper & Brothers – via Wikisource.
- Plutarch (1919) [2nd century AD]. "Life of Caesar". Parallel Lives. Loeb Classical Library. Vol. 7. Translated by Perrin, Bernadotte. Harvard University Press.
- Plutarch (1917) [2nd century AD]. "Life of Pompey". Parallel Lives. Loeb Classical Library. Vol. 5. Translated by Perrin, Bernadotte. Harvard University Press.
- Pseudo-Caesar (1955). "The Alexandrian War". Caesar: Alexandrian war, African war, Spanish war. Loeb Classical Library. Translated by Way, AG. Harvard University Press. ISBN 978-0-6749-9443-0 – via LacusCurtius.
