= Siege of Brundisium =

49 BC event in Caesar's Civil War

- Part of Caesar's Civil War
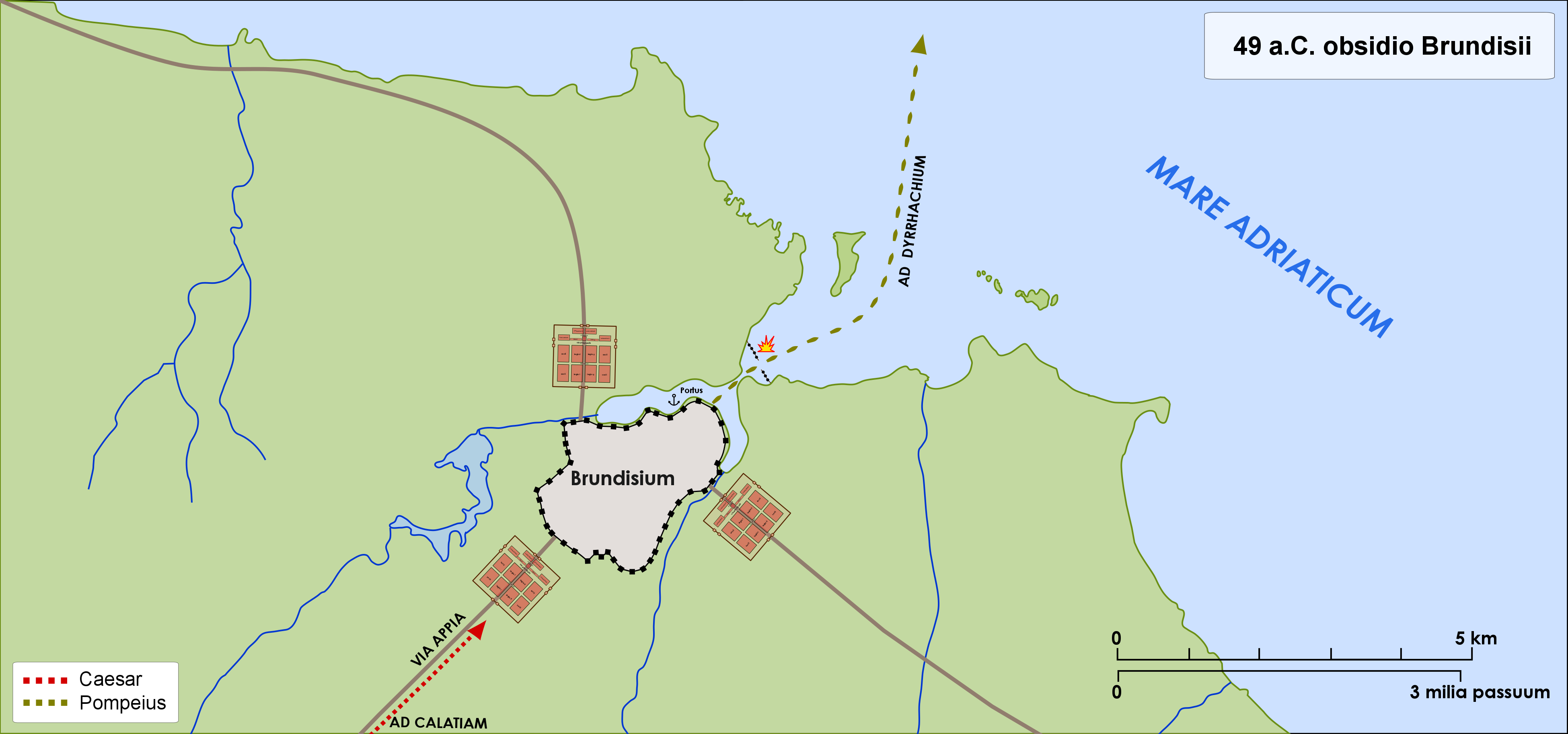
- Map of the siege of Brundisium
Date	9 March – 18 March 49 BC (1 week and 2 days)
Location	Brundisium, Italia, Roman Republic 40.6333°N 17.9333°E
Result	Caesarian victory
Territorial changes	Capture of Brundisium by Julius Caesar

Belligerents
Populares	Optimates

Commanders and leaders
Julius Caesar; Marcus Antonius; Gaius Caninius Rebilus	Pompey; Lucius Scribonius Libo; Lucius Manlius Torquatus

Units involved
Legio VIII; Legio XII; Legio XIII; 3 freshly levied legions	22 cohorts

Strength
6 legions	2 legions

Casualties and losses
Low	Low

The siege of Brundisium was an early military confrontation of Caesar's Civil War. Taking place in March 49 BC, it saw the forces of Gaius Julius Caesar's Populares besiege the Italian city of Brundisium on the coast of the Adriatic Sea which was held by a force of Optimates under the command of Gnaeus Pompeius Magnus. After a series of brief skirmishes, during which Caesar tried to blockade the harbour, Pompey abandoned the city and managed to evacuate his men across the Adriatic to Epirus. Pompey's retreat meant that Caesar had full control over the Italian Peninsula, with no way to pursue Pompey's forces in the east he instead decided to head west to confront the legions Pompey had stationed in Hispania.

== Background ==
Escalating tensions over the previous decade between Gaius Julius Caesar and the Roman Senate, rallying around Gnaeus Pompeius Magnus ("Pompey the Great"), culminated in Caesar crossing the Rubicon river in January 49 BC and thus being labelled as an enemy of the people. Caesar rapidly advanced down the Italian Peninsula capturing numerous cities, towns and settlements such as Arretium, Auximum and Asculum. Most significant was the siege of Corfinium where Caesar's bitter enemy Lucius Domitius Ahenobarbus was handed over to him in a bloodless victory which was achieved in only one week. Ahenobarbus had disobeyed Pompey's orders to rendezvous with him in Apulia where he was amassing his own forces, and as a result 33 of Pompey's cohorts surrendered to Caesar at Corfinium.

== Prelude ==
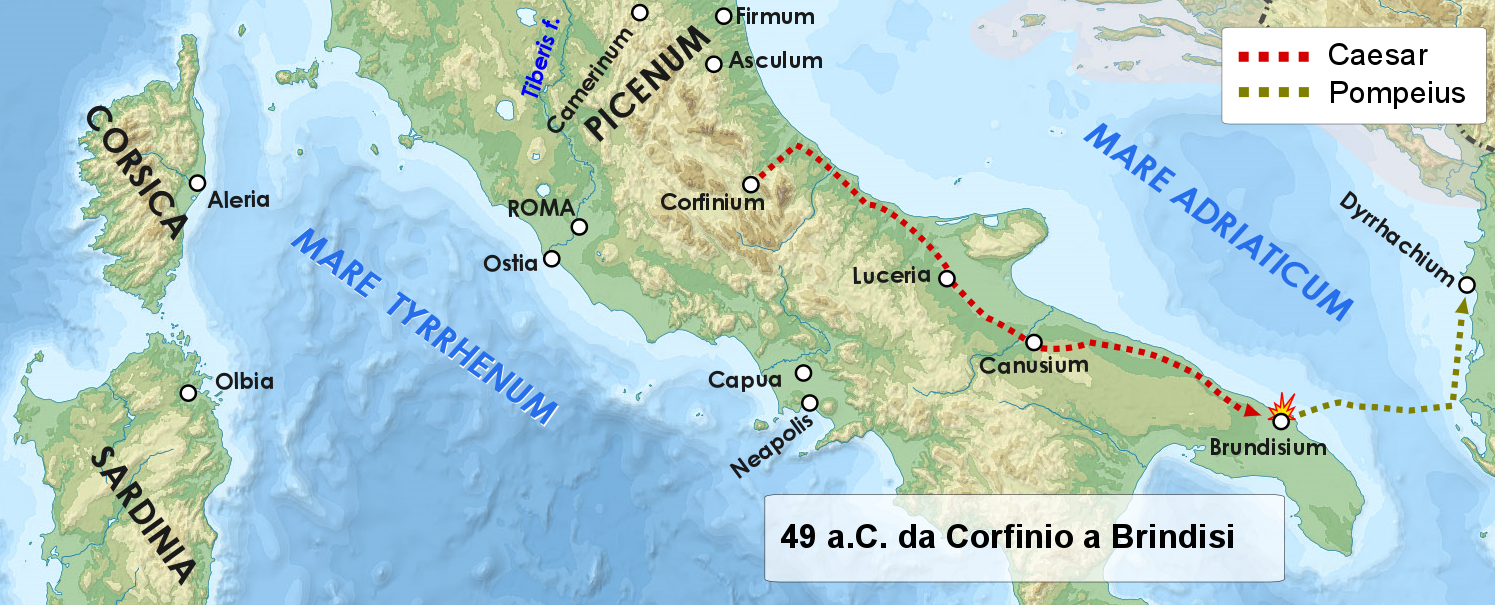
Caesar and Pompey's movements after the siege of Corfinium

Upon hearing the news of the defeat at Corfinium Pompey marched his men from his base in Luceria to Canusium, and then on to Brundisium. Once at Brundisium he again put out the order for all available men to hasten to him, he also set about arming nearby slaves and through this practice managed to levy 300 horsemen.

Caesar had immediately broken camp once the siege of Corfinium was completed and headed south into Apulia to pursue Pompey, passing through the lands of the Marrucini, the Frentani, and the Larinati. The praetor Lucius Manlius Torquatus managed to flee Alba Fucens and reach Pompey with 6 cohorts, while another praetor Lucius Rutilius Lupus was intercepted leaving Tarracina with 3 cohorts by Caesar's cavalry commanded by Bivius Curius. During his march south Caesar managed to recruit several cohorts to his cause. Pompey's chief-engineer, Cnaeus Magius, was captured and sent along to Brundisium with the message that Caesar wished for an audience with Pompey where the two could more easily settle their differences than via messengers.

== Siege ==
Caesar arrived at Brundisium on 9 March 49 BC with a total of 3 veteran legions (Legio VIII, Legio XII and Legio XIII) along with 3 freshly levied legions. Pompey remained within the city with the equivalent of 2 legions. He had been overseeing a massive logistical operation which involved requisitioning merchant vessels so that the vast majority of his forces, and most of the prominent senators who had accompanied him, had already been transferred across the Adriatic to Epirus in Greece. Unsure of whether Pompey intended to stay at Brundisium and retain a foothold in Italy, from which to better exert control over both the peninsula and the Adriatic, or whether he was simply waiting for the remainder of his men to be evacuated Caesar resolved to besiege the city and cut off Pompey's communication lines in the event that the former was true. His plan of action was to build two mounds of dirt on each side of the harbour outside the city, then across the expanse of water would be anchored a number of double-floats. These floats would be thirty feet wide and covered with dirt so as to make them more easily defensible. On every fourth float there was to be constructed a two-storey high defensive turret as well as at either end of the structure.

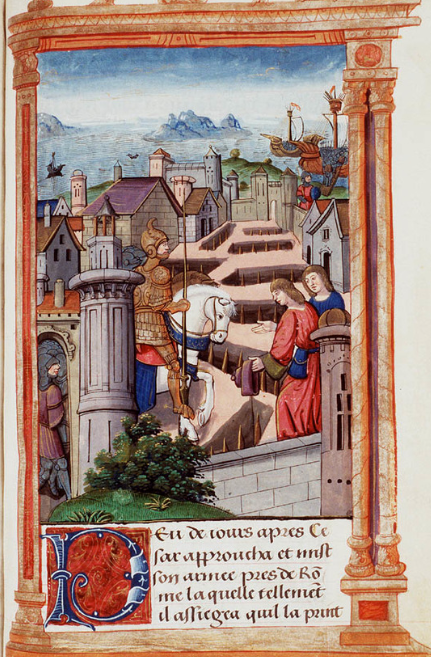
Caesar entering Brundisium and viewing the trenches, stakes and palisades prepared by Pompey to hinder him.

In response to this Pompey gathered boats from the harbour, erected his own three-storey high turrets upon them, and equipped them with siege engines so that he might be able to harry Caesar's defences. To this end a number of skirmishes occurred between the opposing sides, mainly using missiles, as Pompey's men tried to break through the floats and disrupt the construction work.

Still believing there was a chance that Pompey would step back and hold peace negotiations, Caesar claims he approached hostilities in a solely defensive manner. He had been surprised that Pompey had not answered his previous request for a meeting, but nonetheless sent Gaius Caninius Rebilus to meet with one of Pompey's men named Lucius Scribonius Libo. Rebilus' task was to convince Libo, who was a close personal friend of his, to arrange a meeting between Caesar and Pompey where a peace could be negotiated. The answer that Pompey gave Libo was that any such negotiations would be impossible as neither of the serving consuls were present to oversee them. Caesar took this to mean that the opportunity for a peaceful settlement at Brundisium was over and so he began more aggressive action.

After nine days, and at around the time where Caesar's flotilla was halfway complete, Pompey's transport fleet returned from Dyrrachium in Greece and passed through the blockade into Brundisium. Pompey began preparations for himself and the rest of his men to leave the city; he ordered his men to harass Caesar's forces and began reinforcing the streets and gates of the city with trenches, stakes, and palisades so as to limit the chances of Caesar's men infiltrating the city at the moment of the evacuation. To this end he had all the gates to the city barred up and built two fortified passageways leading to the port. When the preparations were complete he ordered his men to quietly board the newly arrived ships under cover of these passageways, and posted some lightly armed sentries on the walls to further cover his true intentions. Once his men were all embarked, Pompey was to signal to this small detachment on the walls who would then head for some rowboats which had been stored for them in a secure location.

The people of Brundisium, apparently irritated by Pompey's and his men's attitude while within the city along with his disruptive defensive works, signalled to Caesar from the tops of houses once they realised that Pompey had left the city. Caesar received these signals and immediately ordered his men to prepare siege-ladders for a storming of the walls. As night fell, Pompey set off with his fleet. As they were scaling the walls Caesar's men were warned by the disgruntled residents of the many traps and fortifications which had been thrown up within them, and were then guided around the perimeter of the city to where the port lay.

Using some of the small boats left in the port Caesar's men were able to capture two of Pompey's ships, along with all of the men on board, which had run up against one of the fortified mounds of dirt. The rest of Pompey's fleet successfully bypassed Caesar's construction works and set a course for Dyrrachium.

== Aftermath ==
By capturing Brundisium Caesar now had control of the entirety of Italia, although he had failed to prevent Pompey's escape. While pursuit was Caesar's preferred course of action, for he did not wish for Pompey to be able to rally all the troops he had stationed in the east, there were simply not enough ships left in the port for this to be carried out effectively. Additional ships would have to arrive from those places under Caesar's control such as Gaul and Picenum which would take time. By waiting for these reinforcements Caesar feared that Pompey's large force currently stationed in Hispania might move against those very same territories loyal to him that he relied upon for reinforcements. Therefore, he resolved to head west and make a pre-emptive strike in order to stop this from happening and to prevent these legions from rendezvousing with Pompey's forces in Greece. Caesar joked that his plan was to first fight "an army without a general" and then face "a general without an army".

On his way to Hispania, Caesar took the opportunity to return to Rome for the first time in nine years. He wished to appear as though he was the legitimate representative of the Republic and so he arranged for the Senate to meet with him outside the boundaries of the city on 1 April. Also invited was the great orator Cicero to whom Caesar sent letters imploring him to come to Rome, but Cicero was not to be persuaded as he was determined not to be used and was wary of the increasingly ominous tone of the letters. Caesar restated his goals to the assembled senators, noticeably lacking in distinguished men, and requested a senatorial envoy be sent to negotiate with Pompey. This envoy did not materialise, possibly on account of the senators being afraid of Pompey whom they could be viewed as having abandoned. To the people of the city he promised that the grain would continue to flow and that every citizen would receive 300 sestercii. Despite this, the reception was still muted as many were wary of the brutality of the last civil war between Marius and Sulla.

The state treasury (or Aerarium) located in the Temple of Saturn was raided to pay for the considerable army Caesar now possessed. A violent scene during which Caesar threatened to kill a dissenting tribune if he did not stand aside culminated in the treasury doors being broken down by his soldiers. The poet Lucan commented wryly that "for the first time Rome was poorer than a Caesar".

Before he departed Caesar took the time to assign duties to his various commanders; Gaius Scribonius Curio was sent to Sicily in order to secure the grain supply, while Quintus Valerius Orca was sent to occupy Sardinia. Publius Licinius Crassus, son of Caesar's former ally in the First Triumvirate, was sent to govern Cisalpine Gaul. Marcus Aemilius Lepidus and Marcus Antonius, both future triumvirs themselves, were left in charge of Rome and Italia respectively. Marcus Antonius' brother, Gaius Antonius, was given command in Illyricum. The construction of two new fleets was also initiated, one to be stationed in the Adriatic under Publius Cornelius Dolabella and another in the Tyrrhenian Sea headed by Quintus Hortensius Hortalus. The rest of the army began the march to confront Pompey's legions.

As he headed west, Caesar would encounter his old rival Lucius Domitius Ahenobarbus who would again be defeated at the siege of Massilia.

Pompey's legates would conduct themselves poorly in the upcoming campaign against Caesar where he would gain a decisive win at the Battle of Ilerda.
