= Lucius Vibullius Rufus =

1st century BC Roman general

Lucius Vibullius Rufus was a Roman politician and general who lived during the 1st century BC. He sided with Pompey during Caesar's Civil War.

== Biography ==
In 49 BC, during the very early stages of his civil war against Julius Caesar, Pompey appointed Lucius Rufus as praefectus fabrum, a military engineering officer. He was sent to the city of Asculum in northern Italia to help recruit men to the Pompeian cause. However, as Caesar advanced upon the city the inhabitants promptly surrendered themselves to him. Rufus, along with Publius Cornelius Lentulus Spinther and the remaining Pompeians who had not defected retreated back from the city and Rufus worked on consolidating cohorts from nearby settlements. Following this, Rufus and Spinther headed to Corfinium, which was being held by Lucius Domitius Ahenobarbus, and prepared for a siege.

After the Siege of Corfinium, the Pompeians holding the city surrendered to Caesar and Rufus was taken prisoner. As was Caesar's custom during this time, he allowed all of the captured senators to go free. Rufus remained aligned with Pompey's cause and he was despatched to Hispania to assist Marcus Petreius, Lucius Afranius and Marcus Terentius Varro. Pompey's men in Hispania were defeated by Caesar's forces and Rufus once again found himself a prisoner of Caesar, and he was once again granted clemency.

Upon landing in Macedonia in 48 BC, Caesar sent Rufus ahead to negotiate peace terms with Pompey; believing that due to the favours he now owed and his relationship with Pompey that he would be a prime candidate to do so. The terms posited that both having suffered significant losses Caesar and Pompey should dismiss their armies within the following three days and allow the senate to debate the matter. Rufus met with Pompey somewhere in the Candavia mountains, but rather than discussing the terms of a potential peace he instead informed Pompey of Caesar's movements. Prior to the First Battle of Dyrrachium, Rufus put forward Caesar's peace terms but they were quickly dismissed by Pompey who argued: "What need have I of life or Rome, if the world shall think I enjoy them by the bounty of Caesar: an opinion which can never be removed while it shall be thought that I have been brought back by him to Italy, from which I set out".
