= Siege of Corfinium =

Siege in 49 BC, part of Caesar's Civil War

- Part of Caesar's Civil War
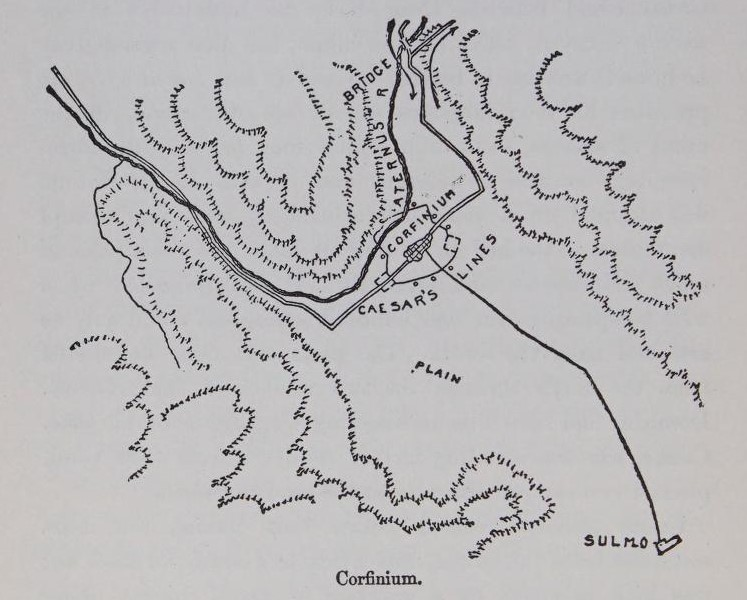
- Map of the siege
Date	15 February – 21 February 49 BC (6 days)
Location	Corfinium, Italia, Roman Republic 42.1174°N 13.8352°E
Result	Caesarian victory
Territorial changes	Capture of Corfinium by Julius Caesar

Belligerents
Populares	Optimates

Commanders and leaders
Gaius Julius Caesar; Marcus Antonius; Gaius Scribonius Curio	L. Domitius Ahenobarbus; P. C. Lentulus Spinther; Lucius Vibullius Rufus

Units involved
Legio VIII; Legio XII; Legio XIII; 22 freshly levied cohorts from Cisalpine Gaul and northern Italy; 7 cohorts from Sulmo; 300 auxiliary cavalrymen from Noricum	33 cohorts

Strength
Initial: 2 legions At end of siege: 6 legions	3 legions c. 16,000 legionaries

Casualties and losses
None	33 cohorts surrendered

The siege of Corfinium was the first significant military confrontation of Caesar's Civil War. Undertaken in February 49 BC, it saw the forces of Gaius Julius Caesar's Populares besiege the Italian city of Corfinium, which was held by a force of Optimates under the command of Lucius Domitius Ahenobarbus. The siege lasted only a week, after which the defenders surrendered themselves to Caesar. This bloodless victory was a significant propaganda coup for Caesar and hastened the retreat of the main Optimate force from Italia, leaving the Populares in effective control of the entire peninsula.

== Background ==
Over the previous decade Julius Caesar had scored a series of military victories in the previously unconquered lands of Germania, Britannia, and most prominently Gaul during the Gallic Wars. These victories in the name of the Roman Republic, along with previous reforms he had made as consul, won him massive popularity among the people and the Roman Senate was becoming increasingly fearful of the political power he had come to wield. This situation was exacerbated by the sheer number of legions Caesar had managed to amass, sometimes illegally, during his years on campaign. Those in opposition to Caesar had come to rally around Gnaeus Pompeius Magnus ("Pompey the Great"), regarded as Rome's greatest general and a former ally of Caesar's during the time of the First Triumvirate.

The Senate was planning to prosecute Caesar for war crimes upon the end of his proconsular term as governor of Transalpine Gaul, Illyricum and Cisalpine Gaul, and Caesar was determined to become consul for the year 49 BC so as to retain his legal immunity. In December 50 BC he wrote to the Senate asking if he could run for Consul in absentia without having to physically return to Rome where he could be apprehended; he also agreed to disband his legions if Pompey did the same. Caesar wished to make clear that Pompey had also been given extraordinary commands in Hispania just as he had in Gaul, and therefore the two men should be treated equally in this matter. A majority in the Senate did not wish for a civil war and a motion was passed showing they were open to the idea of both Pompey and Caesar leaving their provincial commands, even if such votes still showed that Caesar's resignation was preferred over Pompey's. Pompey himself would only comply if Caesar did so first, likewise Caesar could not agree to these demands and wished for Pompey to be the one to act first, and as a result a deadlock ensued. Eventually, the Senate rejected his requests and instead demanded he disband his legions and return to Rome immediately, or be labelled an enemy of the people. Caesar saw this as an illegal act against his right to hold his army until his proconsular governorships expired.

On 1 January 49 BC Caesar sent former tribune of the plebs Gaius Scribonius Curio to Rome with an ultimatum letter. This letter was read aloud to the Senate by the new tribunes Marcus Antonius and Quintus Cassius Longinus who were also Caesar loyalists. It once more made the claim that Caesar would leave his command if Pompey also agreed to do so. In response the Senate once again voted to strip Caesar of his command and demand he return to Rome; a second vote on the subject was held after negotiations broke down and the tribunes used their special veto to block the motion from carrying. It is here that the Senate passed the senatus consultum ultimum, enabling emergency powers and overriding the tribunes' veto.

At the same time Caesar was officially declared an enemy of the Republic and leading Populares such as an tribunes Curio, and Marcus Caelius Rufus fled to regroup with Caesar in Ravenna.

Caesar considered his actions carefully and then crossed the Rubicon on 11 January 49 BC with Legio XIII, declaring that "the die is cast". By advancing under arms into the Roman home province of Italia, and beyond the boundaries of his own provinces where he held imperium, civil war was ignited between the forces in support of Caesar and those in support of the Senate led by Pompey.

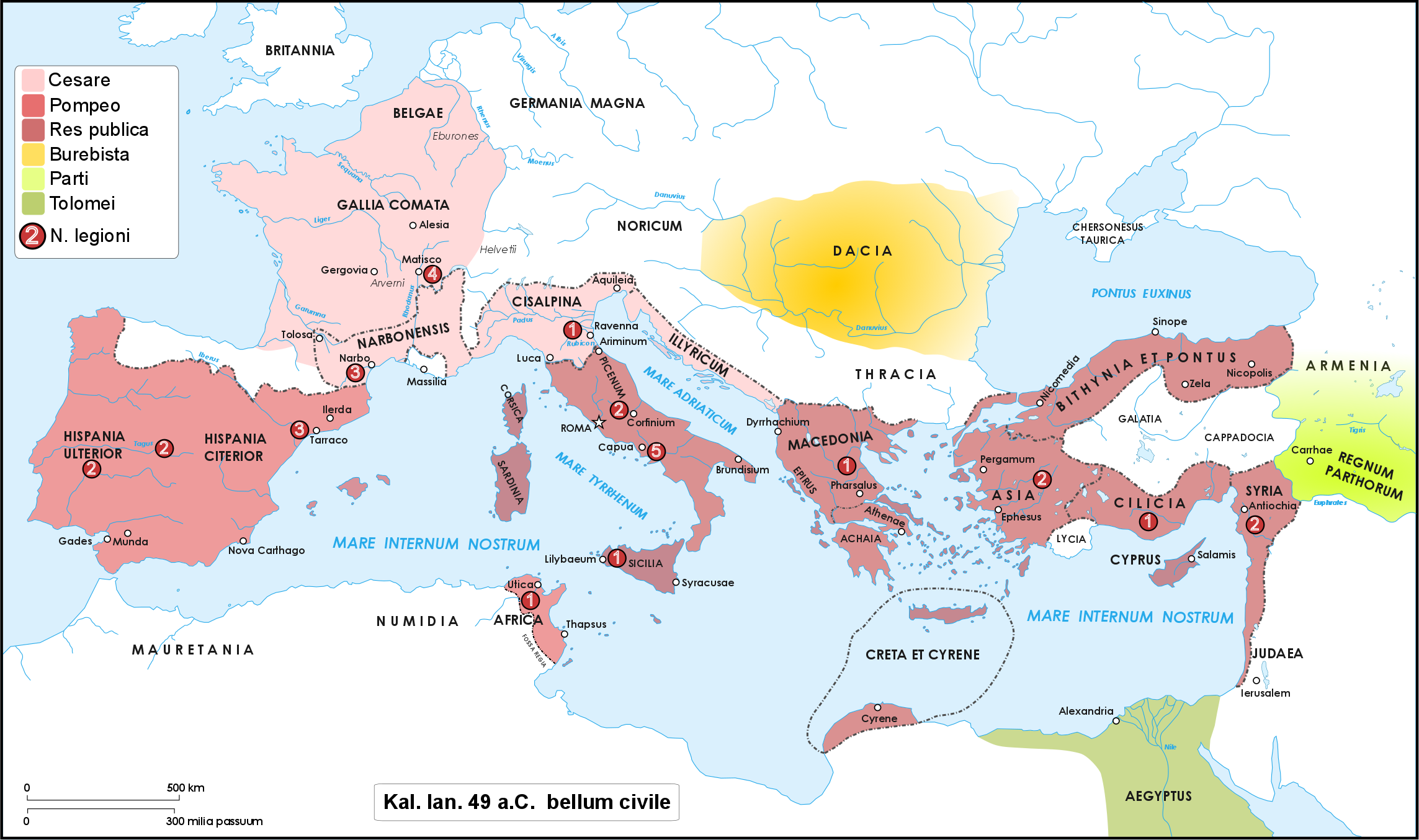
The Roman World on 1st January 49 BC.

Caesar had 12 legions at his disposal; 10 of these were veterans of his campaigns wintering beyond the Alps in Gaul, while the remainder consisted of 22 cohorts recently raised in his province of Transalpine Gaul. These forces were complemented by auxiliaries and allies that Caesar had accrued in Gaul and Germania. In total it is estimated that this would account for 30,000 - 45,000 men. Pompey and the Senate had a much larger pool of resources and men to draw upon but only 2 legions were present in the home province at the beginning of 49 BC, both stationed in southern Italy. Both these legions had been recently transferred from Caesar's command, to take part in a planned war against Parthia, and had spent years fighting for him so their loyalty was far from certain. Pompey did have 7 fully trained legions stationed in Hispania, however these had had little to no real combat experience and were far removed from the current theatre of operations. In the long term the Optimates were confident that they would be able to crush Caesar. The Spanish legions could be recalled, new recruits were being levied in Italy, and in the eastern provinces Pompey possessed a vast network of clients and allies from which he could call upon for wealth and men. Armies take time to train and mobilise but if given that time it was perfectly reasonable to assume that Caesar could be overwhelmed.

== Prelude ==
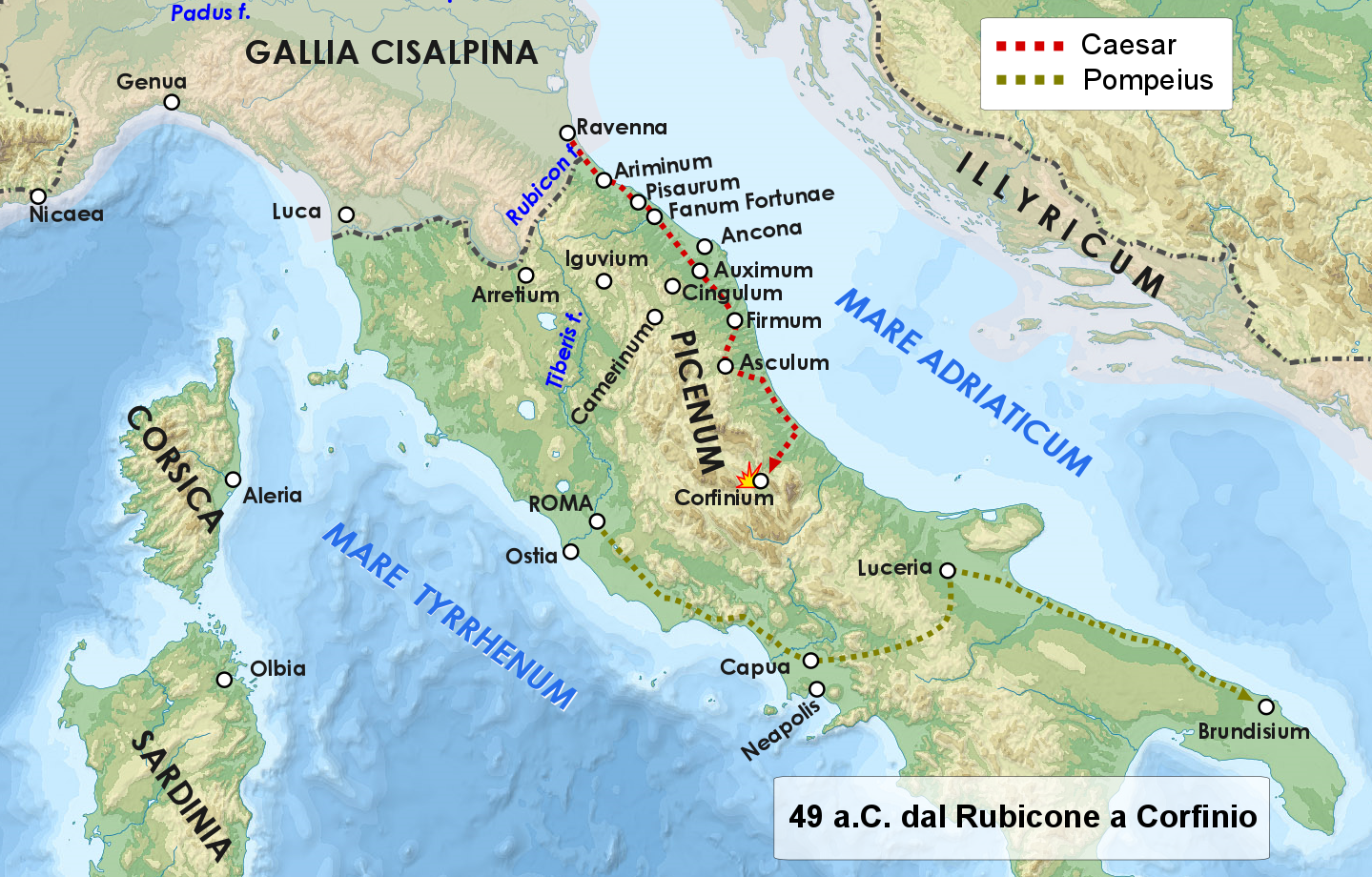
Map of Caesar's campaigns in 49 BC from the Rubicon to Corfinium

Caesar immediately began a swift advance down the Italian Peninsula and made his first base at Ariminum, it was either at this point or previously at Ravenna that he addressed his men. He spoke of the terrible injustices wrought upon him by his enemies, of his sadness at how his old friend and ally Pompey had turned against him through jealousy, and of how the Senate had trampled on the rights of the tribunes' veto. His words greatly roused the assembled men who were intensely loyal to Caesar.

Marcus Antonius was given command of 5 cohorts and sent to capture Arretium, a task which he succeeded in. Caesar himself then conducted operations against Pisaurum, Fanum Fortunae and Ancona, and capturing each city with a single cohort. Gaius Scribonius Curio was then acquitted with 3 cohorts and sent to capture Iguvium; the tribune who was holding the city withdrew his forces and retreated for he feared that the inhabitants were too favourable towards Caesar's cause which allowed Curio to take the city and receive the adulation of the crowds. A similar feat was replicated when soon after Caesar marched on Auximum which was being held by Publius Attius Varus. The senate within the city visited Varus and made it known that they would not support any action against Caesar whom they viewed as a respected general of the republic. Varus, shocked by this declaration, fled the city with his men who then in turn deserted him and were welcomed into the fold by Caesar.

The quickness of this advance led to panic in Rome and Pompey, possibly under the impression that Caesar would only dare to attempt such direct action with a far larger force, made the unprecedented decision to abandon the defence of Rome and evacuate the Roman Senate from the Eternal City. He sent orders for all of his nearby forces to march south to Apulia in order to regroup and await the arrival of the overwhelming strength of the legions out in the provinces. According to Caesar, the panic was so great that the consul for the year Lucius Cornelius Lentulus Crus, who was sent to empty the Roman treasury by order of the Senate, only got so far as opening it before fleeing on account of a rumour that Caesar was approaching the capital.

Lucius Domitius Ahenobarbus, Caesar's long time rival and the newly appointed replacement proconsul of his province of Transalpine Gaul, ignored Pompey's orders and instead fortified his men within the city of Corfinium which lay on the road to southern Italy. Ahenobarbus had managed to muster 22 cohorts from Etruria and nearby provinces, and another 13 cohorts were raised by Lucius Vibullius Rufus and brought to the city, meaning the equivalent of three legions were available for its defence. These were all raw recruits and as a result Pompey sent numerous letters urging against the defence of the city, knowing they were at a severe disadvantage against Caesar's veterans who had spent the last decade fighting with him in Gaul. He believed it would be more prudent for the force to link up with his own men (currently Legio I, Legio II and a large number of new conscripts) further south in Apulia. Nonetheless, Ahenobarbus was unmoved as he believed that he outnumbered Caesar 3 to 1 and on the contrary urged Pompey to instead bring his men north to Corfinium.

Moving south along the Adriatic seaboard, each passing settlement greeted Caesar warmly and provided for the needs of his army. Even Cingulum which had been built and paid for by Titus Labienus, Caesar's former lieutenant who chose to side with Pompey, gladly cooperated. During this time Caesar had sent for the remainder of his men to join him from their winter quarters and was soon strengthened by Legio XII meaning he had two legions at his disposal. Advancing through Picenum he soon accepted the surrender of the city of Asculum and sent Curio to capture two more cities and raise recruits for the upcoming siege of Corfinium. Caesar remained at Asculum for one day before breaking camp again. Approaching Corfinium Caesar's forces engaged in a brief skirmish with a detachment of five cohorts from the garrison sent to demolish a bridge three miles west of the city, after they were defeated he advanced and encamped his men outside of the city walls on February 15. At the outset of the siege Caesar had 2 legions against Ahenobarbus' 3 legions defending Corfinium.

== Siege ==
Upon Caesar's arrival outside the city Ahenobarbus strengthened the city defences, had his men man the walls, and sent messengers to Pompey requesting troops to relieve the siege. He argued that by trapping the attackers against the walls between two armies then supplies could be easily cut off and the force routed. Additionally, he warned that without the reinforcements it was possible that his 33 cohorts and a large number of senators within the city could fall into Caesar's possession. He also made a pronouncement that every private soldier who participated in the defence of Corfinium would receive four acres from his own estate.

Meanwhile, Caesar learned the nearby Optimate-controlled city of Sulmo which lay seven miles beyond Corfinium was sympathetic to his cause and he sent Marcus Antonius with five cohorts of Legio XIII to see to its capture. Upon seeing the approach of Caesar's standard the inhabitants opened the gates and graciously met with Antonius who accepted the loyalty of the seven cohorts stationed within. The former commanders Quintus Lucretius Vespillo and Gaius Attius attempted to flee the scene but Attius was captured and brought along with the legions to unite with Caesar.

Caesar himself spent three days entrenching his men and scouring the nearby countryside for food and supplies. It was during this time that Caesar received reinforcements of his own in the form of Legio VIII, 22 newly recruited cohorts from Gaul and 300 auxiliary cavalry units from the king of Noricum all of which were stationed in a separate camp under the command of Curio, positioned on the opposite side of the city. Caesar then resolved to surround Corfinium with a vallum and a series of forts.

As the construction of these works was nearing completion the messengers returned and Ahenobarbus learned that Pompey had refused his request for reinforcements stating that such an ordeal was too risky and that Ahenobarbus had acted against his advice and orders. Despite this Ahenobarbus announced to his men that Pompey would be coming to their assistance in due course. He then attempted to flee the city only for his escape to be foiled by the multitude of blockades and devices surrounding his position.

Having uncovered the true nature of Pompey's response, this escape attempt was subsequently discovered by disgruntled senior officers within the city and they came together in agreement that despatches should be sent to Caesar that they would open the gates and deliver Ahenobarbus to him alive. It is also possible that Ahenobarbus was planning an evacuation at this point and it was the prospect of long campaigns abroad with Pompey which motivated them to abandon their leader. On the fourth night of the siege Publius Cornelius Lentulus Spinther, who had previously fled the city of Asculum upon seeing Caesar's advance and taken refuge in Corfinium, appeared on the walls and asked for an audience with Caesar which he was duly granted. Once in Caesar's presence he begged for his own life to be spared, citing the prior friendship between the two men, and Caesar encouraged him by claiming "that he had not left his province to do mischief, but to protect himself from the injuries of his enemies; to restore to their dignity the tribunes of the people who had been driven out of the city on his account, and to assert his own liberty, and that of the Roman people, who were oppressed by a few factious men". Spinther then returned into the city and spread word of Caesar's clemency which allayed many fears. It was claimed that Ahenobarbus had asked his physician to provide him with poison but upon hearing of Caesar's mercy was delighted to hear that he had only been administered a sleeping draught.

The Greek historian Appian, writing almost 200 years after the events, gives a far briefer description of the siege than Caesar. He simply writes that Ahenobarbus was apprehended by his own men while trying to flee before being handed over to Caesar.

== Aftermath ==
The following day Caesar ordered that all senators and their children, tribunes and equites within the city be brought to him. In total 50 of these such men were presented including Domitius Ahenobarbus and his son, Lentulus Spinther, as well as prominent senators such as Lucius Vibullius Rufus and Sextus Quintilius Varus. Caesar made sure that these men fully understood the kindness he was showing them and the justness of his cause before allowing them to go free. Many of these men immediately fled to Pompey. The treasury of Corfinium, some 6,000,000 sesterces, was also delivered to Caesar though this he returned to Ahenobarbus as he knew it to be public funds raised by Pompey to pay the garrison and did not wish to appear to be more restrained with the lives of men than he was with their wealth. The 33 cohorts previously under the command of Ahenobarbus swore new oaths to Caesar, bolstering his forces considerably with the strength of roughly 3 legions.

Caesar's stay at Corfinium lasted seven days in total and after accepting its surrender he immediately broke camp and set out into Apulia to pursue Pompey. Upon learning of Caesar's victory Pompey began to march his army from Luceria to Canusium and then on to Brundisium where he could further retreat by crossing the Adriatic Sea to Epirus. As he began his march Caesar had with him six legions, having immediately sent Ahenobarbus' legions under Curio to secure Sicily; they would later fight for him in Africa. Pompey would be soon be besieged in Brundisium by Caesar's army, though despite this his evacuation was a success.

The leniency shown by Caesar to the defenders of Corfinium was typical of the strategy he would employ throughout the remainder of the civil war. It was a significant propaganda victory, Caesar had shown clemency towards those he defeated from the outset of the war but never to a group so distinguished as this or made up of men so bitter in their hatred towards him. By appearing to forgive his enemies and restraining his troops from taking any plunder he had ensured that the peoples of Italia, who were largely apathetic to the politics of the civil war, would remain welcoming to him. In this regard his approach made practical sense.

Ahenobarbus was deeply surprised by the treatment he had received as he and Caesar shared a great enmity; after being dismissed from Corfinium he briefly retired to Cosa in Etruria before sailing to Massilia where he once again unsuccessfully defended a city against Caesar's supporters in the Siege of Massilia.
