= Vedius (disambiguation) =

Vedius can refer to a number of historical or mythological people:

- Vejovis (sometimes "Vedius"), a Roman god
- Vedius Pollio, an ancient Roman of equestrian status in the 1st century BCE, and a friend of the emperor Augustus
- Vedius Aquila, an ancient Roman general in the 1st century CE who fought in the Year of the Four Emperors
