= Nasidia gens =

Plebeian family at Rome

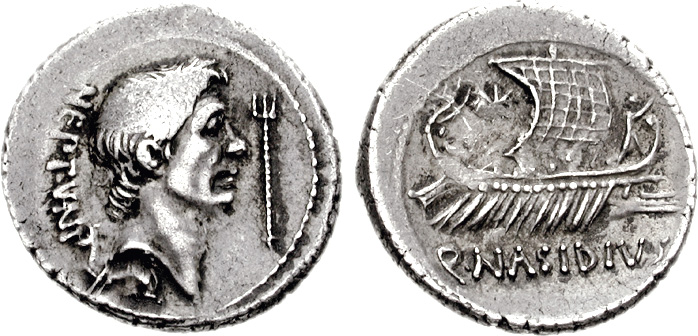
Denarius of Quintus Nasidius, circa 43 BC. The obverse depicts Pompeius Magnus, but bears the name of Neptune, with a dolphin and trident.

The gens Nasidia was an obscure plebeian family at Rome. The gens is best known from Quintus Nasidius, one of the admirals of Gnaeus Pompeius Magnus during the Civil War. Although none of the Nasidii are known to have held any of the higher offices of the Roman state, a number are known from inscriptions. A coin of this gens depicts the head of Pompeius and a trident on the obverse, and on the reverse a ship, with the inscription Q. Nasidius.

== Origin ==
The nomen Nasidius belong to a class of gentilicia formed with the suffix -idius, which originally developed from surnames ending in -idus, but later came to be viewed as a regular means of forming nomina. It implies the existence of a cognomen Nasidus, but may perhaps be from the more regular Naso, originally signifying someone with a prominent nose. The nomen Nasidienus may, in turn, have been formed from Nasidius or a similar name.

== Praenomina ==
The only praenomina associated with the Nasidii are Quintus, Marcus, Lucius, and Gaius, all of which were very common throughout Roman history.

== Branches and cognomina ==
A large family of Nasidii appears to have settled in Africa Proconsularis and Numidia, and in particular the colony at Castellum Elefantum in Numidia. For convenience they have been grouped together below.

== Members ==
This list includes abbreviated praenomina. For an explanation of this practice, see filiation.

- Quintus Nasidius, (Note: Caesar refers to him as Lucius, but most other records identify him as Quintus, and his name is so given on coins.) an admiral under Gnaeus Pompeius Magnus during the Civil War. He was defeated in the second of two naval battles of Massilia - today Marseille by Caesar's admiral Brutus Decimus. He fled to the Spanish coast, and went further to Africa. He then served under Pompeius' son, Sextus, but eventually went over to Marcus Antonius. He commanded part of the triumvir's fleet, and was defeated by Agrippa off the coast of Patras in 31 BC.
- Quintus Nasidius Severus, mentioned in a funerary inscription from Nicomedia.
- Marcus Nasidius Secundus, a decurion with the tenth legion, buried at Delminium in Illyricum, together with his son, Nasidius Rufinus.
- Nasidius M. f. Rufinus, son of the decurion, buried at Delminium.
- Marcus Nasidius Saturus Sabinianus Noveanus, a flamen whose outstanding service is commemorated in an inscription at Rome, dated AD 322.
- Quintus Nasidius, the former master of Quintus Nasidius Epagatus.
- Quintus Nasidius Q. l. Epagatus, a freedman buried at Rome, aged forty-five.
- Nasidius Valens, the husband of Viria Rufina, who was buried at Fanum Fortunae in Picenum.
- Nasidius Primus, named in a libationary inscription from Alburnus Major in Dacia.

=== Nasidii of Roman Africa ===
- Nasidius Firmus, mentioned in an inscription from Africa Proconsularis.
- Nasidius Januarius, buried at Thubursicum in Africa Proconsularis, aged eighty.
- Lucius Nasidius Crispus, buried at Cirta in Numidia, aged ninety-five.
- Quintus Nasidius Arator, buried at Castellum Elefantum in Numidia, aged forty-five.
- Gaius Nasidius Florus, buried at Castellum Elefantum, aged forty-five.
- Nasidius Secundus, buried at Castellum Elefantum, aged fifty-five.
- Quintus Nasidius Secundillus, buried at Castellum Elefantum, aged fifty.
- Nasidius Sodalis, buried at Castellum Elefantum, aged thirty.

== See also ==
- List of Roman gentes

== Bibliography ==
- Gaius Julius Caesar, Commentarii de Bello Civili (Commentaries on the Civil War).
- Aulus Hirtius, De Bello Africo (On the African War, attributed).
- Marcus Tullius Cicero, Epistulae ad Atticum.
- Appianus Alexandrinus (Appian), Bellum Civile (The Civil War).
- Lucius Cassius Dio Cocceianus (Cassius Dio), Roman History.
- Dictionary of Greek and Roman Biography and Mythology, William Smith, ed., Little, Brown and Company, Boston (1849).
- Theodor Mommsen et alii, Corpus Inscriptionum Latinarum (The Body of Latin Inscriptions, abbreviated CIL), Berlin-Brandenburgische Akademie der Wissenschaften (1853–present).
- René Cagnat et alii, L'Année épigraphique (The Year in Epigraphy, abbreviated AE), Presses Universitaires de France (1888–present).
- Stéphane Gsell, Inscriptions Latines de L'Algérie (Latin Inscriptions from Algeria, abbreviated ILAlg), Edouard Champion, Paris (1922–present).
- T. Robert S. Broughton, The Magistrates of the Roman Republic, American Philological Association (1952).
