= Morisena (castra) =

- Castra of Cenad
- Location within Romania
- 46°04′20″N 20°37′46″E
- Location: Seliște, Cărămidăria Veche, Sânnicolau Mare, Timiș, Romania

History
- Founded: 2nd century AD

Site notes
- Excavation dates: 1974 - 1975; 1986; 1993 - 1995; 2000
- Condition: Ruined

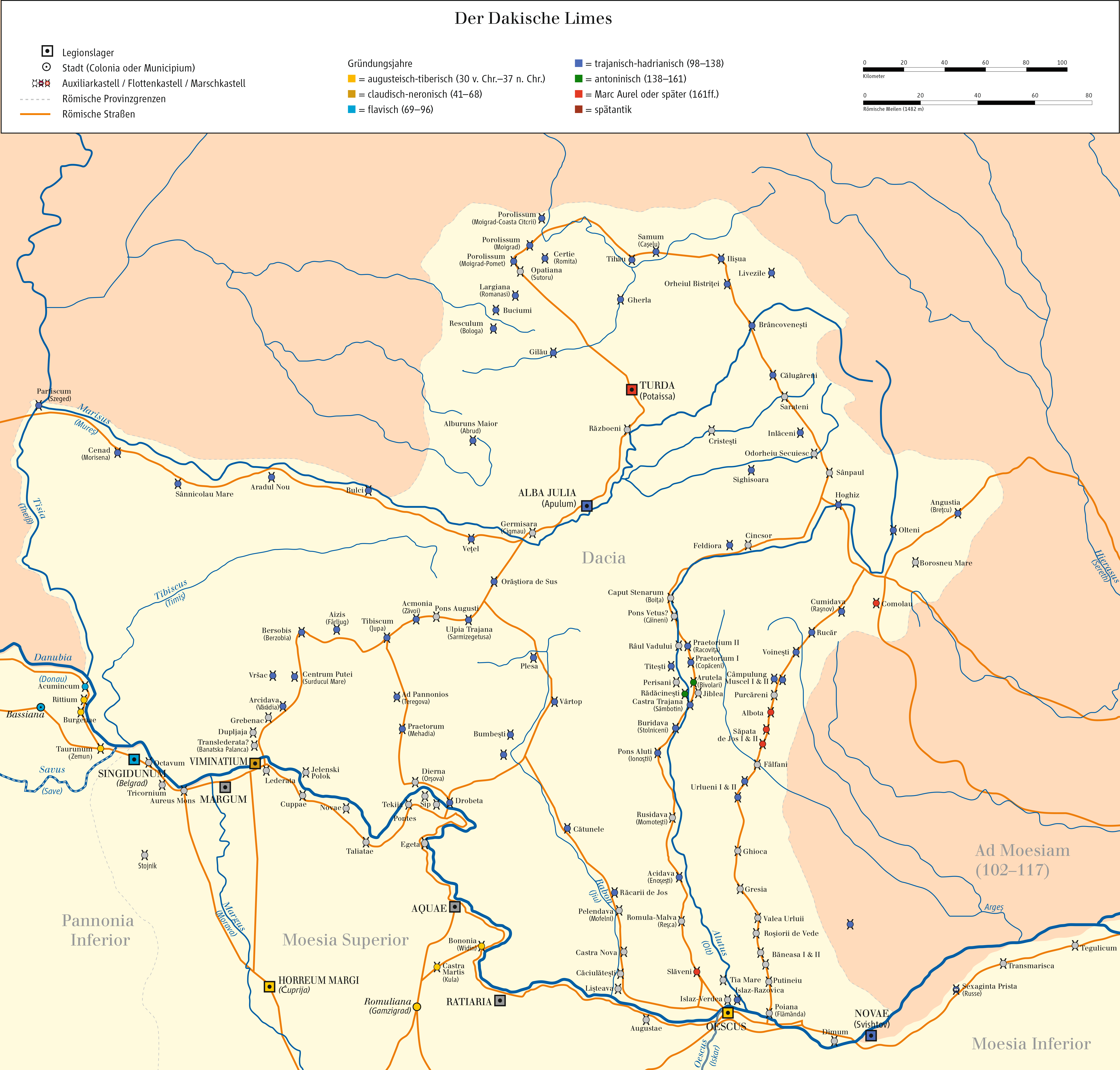
Map of the Limes in Dacia in Morisena

Morisena was a castra in the Roman province of Dacia. Morisena was a Roman auxiliary camp and part of the outline in the western fortress chain of the Dacian Limes. It was located within the modern municipality of Cenad, Romania.

== Location ==
The fort is located in western Romania, between the rivers Mureș (Latin Marisus, Hungarian Marosch) and Aranka, where the Marosch marks the natural border to Hungary. The distance to Timișoara is 80 km. Today the fort is located under the town centre. Its centre was in the courtyard of the Protestant church. The camp area is also known under the field name "Cetate" (= fortress). Traces of a camp corner can still be seen in the area.

== Development and function ==
In the course of the Second Dacian War (105-106 AD) Trajan also occupied the areas north of Mureș and incorporated them into the new province of Dacia Superior. On the territory of today's Cetate, the Roman army built a fort, which at first was probably occupied by a legionary exile. A civil settlement (vicus or canabae) soon developed in the vicinity of the fort, whose ancient name was passed down as Morisena ("Castrum iuxta Morisium" = fort on the Mures). The fort and settlement probably existed until the early 3rd century AD.

The auxiliary cohort, probably stationed here later, was responsible for monitoring and securing the road connection from Micia to Partiscum, which ran northwest along the southern bank of the river Mureș.

== Finds ==
The site was not systematically examined. So far only small finds have been recovered, brick stamps of Legio XIII Gemina seem to at least confirm the identification of the site as a Roman military complex. The fortification was probably built in the early 2nd century by a vexillation of this legion. Reading finds and brick stamps can be found today in the Banat National Museum (Muzeul Național al Banatului), Timișoara.

From this site two inscriptions were recovered:

=== I ===
M(arco) Papirio M(arci) F(ilio) Pan(oniae)
Praef(ecto) Coh(ortis) I Pan(oniae)
In Dacia Praef(ecto) Ripae Tibisci Danu-
bii Curatori Pont-
is Aug(us)t(i) In Moesia
(Duum)viro Pop(ulus) Plebs(que)
Ulpia(e) Traian(a)
Sar(mizegetusa) Patr(ono) H(oc) M(omentum) P(osuit)

=== II ===
Corneliae
Saloniae
Aug(usti) Coniugi
Gallieni A(ugusti) C(aesarie)N(ostri)
Ordo Muni(cipalis)
Tib(iscanus) dev(eto) Nvm(ini)
Maiestati(s)q(ue) Eius

== Monument protection ==
The entire archaeological site, and in particular the fort, are protected as historical monuments under Act No. 422/2001, adopted in 2001, and are entered on the National Register of Historic Monuments in Romania (Lista Monumentelor Istorice)[1] The Ministry of Culture and National Identity (Ministerul Culturii şi Patrimoniului Naţional), in particular the General Directorate of National Cultural Heritage, the Department of Fine Arts and the National Commission of Historical Monuments, and other important institutions subordinate to the Ministry, are responsible for the protection of the entire archaeological site and in particular the fort. Unauthorised excavations and the export of antique objects are prohibited in Romania.

== See also ==
- List of castra
