= Battle of Tauroento =

49 BC naval engagement, part of Caesar's Civil War

- Part of the Siege of Massilia during Caesar's Civil War
Date	31 July 49 BC
Location	Off Tauroento, Mediterranean Sea
Result	Caesarian victory

Belligerents
Caesarians	Pompeians; City of Massilia

Commanders and leaders
Decimus Junius Brutus Albinus	Lucius Nasidius; Lucius Domitius Ahenobarbus

Units involved
Caesarian fleet	Pompeian fleet Massiliot fleet

Strength
Total: 18 ships	Total: 34 ships: 17 Pompeian ships; 17 Massiliot ships

Casualties and losses
Unknown	Total: 9 ships lost: 5 Massiliot ships sunk; 4 Massiliot ships captured

The Battle of Tauroento was a naval battle fought off the coast of Tauroento during Caesar's Civil War. Following a successful naval battle outside Massilia, the Caesarian fleet commanded by Decimus Junius Brutus Albinus once again came into conflict with the Massiliot fleet and a Pompeian relief fleet led by Quintus Nasidius on 31 July 49 BC. Despite being significantly outnumbered, the Caesarians prevailed and the Siege of Massilia was able to continue leading to the eventual surrender of the city.

== Background ==
On his way to confront Pompey's legions in Hispania, while passing through southern Gaul, Julius Caesar was forced to quickly initiate a siege of the independent Greek coastal city of Massilia against Lucius Domitius Ahenobarbus. After preparations were complete, Caesar continued west leaving Gaius Trebonius in command of the land forces while Decimus Junius Brutus Albinus was in command of the Caesarian fleet. Brutus had been ordered to build 12 new ships and put these to good use in a naval battle off the coast of the city during which the Pompeians saw their attempt at breaking the naval blockade defeated.

== Prelude ==
Lucius Nasidius, sailing up the coast of the Italian Peninsula from Sicily on orders from Pompey, managed to get in contact with Ahenobarbus and convinced him that the time was right for a second attempt at breaking the blockade.

In the month since the previous naval defeat on 27 June, the Massiliots had managed to build 9 new ships thus replenishing the ships they had lost and leaving them with 17 ships in total. This fleet from Massilia met up with Nasidius' relief force at Tauroento, a nearby Massiliot fortress, which consisted of another 17 ships. Therefore, in total the Pompeians had assembled a fleet of 34 ships. This significantly outnumbered the Caesarian fleet which consisted of the 12 ships built at Arelate along with another 6 taken from the Massiliots in the previous battle, totalling 18 ships overall.

Decimus Brutus guided the Caesarian fleet south to confront the Pompeians and the two sides clashed in the bay outside of Tauroento.

== Battle ==
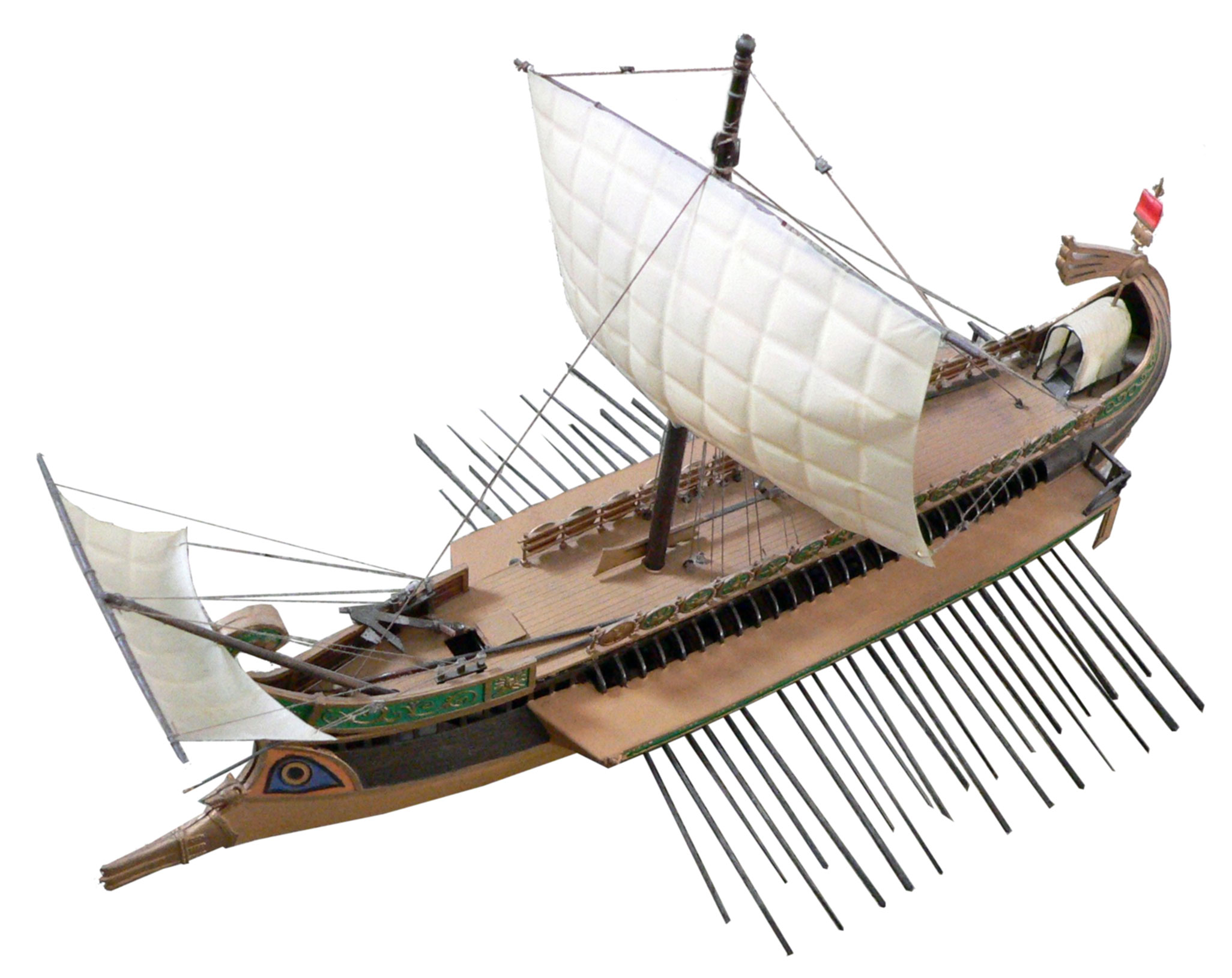
Model of a Roman trireme.

Caesar writes that the Massiliot's acquitted themselves very well during the battle, Decimus Brutus' ships had drifted far from one another giving a favourable situation to the Massiliots who were able to take advantage using their skill at quickly manoeuvring their ships. Whenever an attempt was made to board one of the Pompeian ships, a number of these swift vessels would move in to defend it. Many missiles were involved, inflicting massive damage on the light ships of the Caesarians.

During the battle, an incident occurred where Decimus Brutus found his easily recognisable flagship charged from both sides by two oncoming triremes. Foreseeing the outcome, Brutus accelerated his ship leading the two vessels to collide with one another. These heavily damaged ships were then quickly sunk by other ships of the Caesarian fleet.

Despite being considerably outnumbered, Brutus' fleet came out of the battle victorious and the opposing fleet was very badly damaged. So much so that only 7 of the 17 Massiliot ships managed to return to port; 5 were sunk, 4 were captured, and another retreated to Nasidius. Nasidius did not commit his fleet to the battle after having seen the fate of the Massiliots and so not one ship of his 17 was lost and he quickly withdrew.

== Aftermath ==
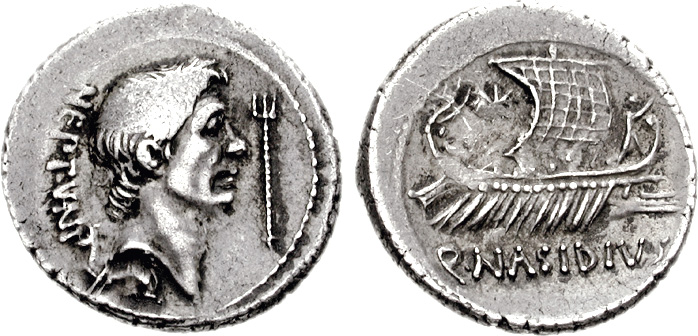
Coin minted by Nasidius while he was in service to Sextus Pompeius.

The naval victory at Tauroento meant that the siege of Massilia could continue with a naval blockade in place. Nasidius decided that, given the state of the Massiliot fleet, it would be prudent to lend his support to Pompey's forces in Hispania Citerior rather than continue to assist operations in Gaul. The city of Massilia was dismayed to learn of the destruction of their fleet but nonetheless prepared for many more months under siege. Soon after the defeat Ahenobarbus fled from Massilia and managed to escape capture under cover of a violent storm.

Six months after Ahenobarbus' flight, having reached the point of famine, Massilia surrendered to the Caesarians.
