= Quintus Nasidius =

1st century Roman naval commander

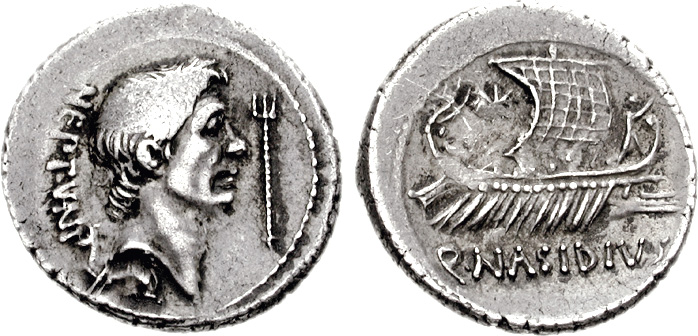

Quintus Nasidius, sometimes referred to as Lucius Nasidius, was a Roman naval commander who lived during the 1st century BC and sided with the optimates during Caesar's civil war.

== Biography ==
Nasidius is first mentioned, under the name Lucius, in Julius Caesar's commentaries as being given command of 17 ships by Pompey and sent to assist Lucius Domitius Ahenobarbus in the Siege of Massilia in 49 BC. Linking up with the Massiliot fleet, he engaged against Decimus Junius Brutus Albinus in the naval Battle of Tauroento; while the Massiliots fought admirably it appears Nasidius withdrew his own ships once he saw the tide turning against them. He then steered his fleet towards Hispania Citerior where he could assist the legions Pompey had stationed there.

Cicero mentions Nasidius in his letters as having been stationed in Africa at the same time as Caesar was besieged in Alexandria in 47 BC, and having participated in the later African campaigns as a naval commander. Following Caesar's victory in these campaigns, he travelled to Sardinia where he demanded increased treasury contributions and confiscated land from those who had assisted Nasidius' fleet.

He is also featured in the Philippicae, used as an example of an upstanding Roman equite who has been neglected by Marcus Antonius, Octavian, and Decimus Brutus thus highlighting the worsening political situation.

At some point Nasidius served under Sextus Pompeius in opposition to the Second Triumvirate, although he is named among the admirals who deserted Pompeius for Marcus Antonius once his defeat was imminent. Nasidius later sided with Marcus Antonius in the civil war against Octavian, and was defeated at sea by Marcus Agrippa while trying to defend the city of Patrae prior to the Battle of Actium.
