= Vedius Aquila =

Ancient Roman soldier

Vedius Aquila was a military commander of ancient Rome who lived in the 1st century CE. He commanded the thirteenth legion, and was one of Otho's generals during the Year of the Four Emperors. He was present in the First Battle of Bedriacum, in which Otho's troops were defeated by those of Vitellius, in 69, and was captured at the battle's end.

After Otho's suicide, subsequently espoused Vespasian's cause.
