= Legio XIII Gemina =

Roman legion

- Map of the Roman Empire in AD 125, under emperor Hadrian, showing the LEGIO XIII GEMINA, stationed at Apulum (now Alba Iulia, Romania), in the province of Dacia, from AD 106 to c. 271
- Active: 57 BC to sometime in the 5th century
- Country: Roman Republic and Roman Empire
- Type: Roman legion (Caesarian)
- Role: Infantry assault (some cavalry support)
- Size: Varied over unit lifetime. Approx. 3,500 fighting men + support at the time of creation. Expanded and given the cognomen Gemina in 31 BC.
- Garrison/HQ: Burnum, Illyricum (1st century BC); Emona, Italia (1st century); Augusta Vindelica, Germania Superior; Poetovio, Pannonia (1st century); Roman Dacia (106 – c. 270); Dacia Aureliana (since 270); Babylon in Egypt (400s)
- Nicknames: Gemina, "The twin" (since 31 BC); Pia Fidelis, "Faithful and loyal"
- Motto: Leo Rugit Rursum (The Lion Roars Again)
- Mascot: Lion
- Engagements: Gallic Wars (58–51 BC); Battle against the Nervians (57 BC); Battle of Gergovia (52 BC); Battle of Alesia (52 BC)–uncertain; Siege of Corfinium (49 BC); Battle of Dyrrhachium (48 BC); Battle of Pharsalus (48 BC); Battle of Thapsus (46 BC); Battle of Munda (45 BC); Battle of Actium (31 BC); 1st and 2nd Battle of Bedriacum (69); Dacian Wars (101–102,105–106); Vexillationes of the 13th participated in many other campaigns.

Commanders
- Notable commanders: Julius Caesar, Marcus Salvius Otho, Marcus Antonius Primus

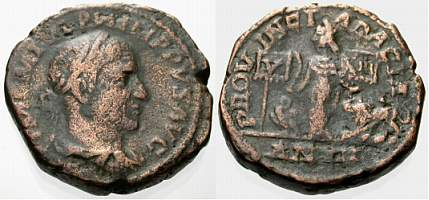
Sestertius minted in 248 by Philip the Arab to celebrate the province of Dacia and its legions, V Macedonica and XIII Gemina. Note the eagle and lion, symbols on the reverse, respectively of legio V and legio XIII.

Legio XIII Gemina, (Note: XIII is read out as tertia decima. Reconstructed pronunciation of the full name: [ˈlɛɡioː t̪ɛrt̪ia ˈd̪ɛkɪma ˈɡɛmɪna].) in English the 13th "Twin" Legion was a legion of the Republican, and later Imperial, Roman Army. It was one of Julius Caesar's key units in Gaul and in the civil war, and was the legion with which he crossed the Rubicon in January, perhaps on 10 January, in 49 BC. The legion appears to have still been in existence in the 5th century AD. Its symbol was the lion.

== History ==
=== Under the late Republic ===
Legio XIII was levied by Julius Caesar in 57 BC, before marching against the Belgae, in one of his early interventions in intra-Gallic conflicts. During the Gallic Wars (58–51 BC), Legio XIII was present at the Battle against the Nervians, the Siege of Gergovia, and while not specifically mentioned in the sources, it is reasonable to assume that Legio XIII was also present for the Battle of Alesia.

After the end of the Gallic wars, the Roman Senate refused Caesar his second consulship, ordered him to give up his commands, and demanded he return to Rome to face prosecution. Forced to choose either the end of his political career or civil war, Caesar brought Legio XIII across the Rubicon river and into Italy. The legion remained faithful to Caesar during the resulting civil war between Caesar and the conservative Optimates faction of the senate, whose legions were commanded by Pompey. Legio XIII was active throughout the entire war, fighting at Dyrrhachium (48 BC) and Pharsalus (48 BC). After the decisive victory over Pompey at Pharsalus, the legion was to be disbanded, and the legionaries "pensioned off" with the traditional land grants; however, the legion was recalled for the Battle of Thapsus (46 BC) and the final Battle of Munda (45 BC). After Munda, Caesar disbanded the legion, retired his veterans, and gave them farmland in their native Italy.

=== Under the Empire ===
Augustus reconstituted the legion once again in 41 BC to deal with the rebellion of Sextus Pompeius (son of Pompey) in Sicily.

Legio XIII acquired the cognomen Gemina ("twin", a common appellation for legions constituted from portions of others) after being reinforced with veteran legionaries from other legions following the war against Mark Antony and the Battle of Actium. Augustus then sent the legion to Burnum (modern Knin), in Illyricum, a Roman province in the Adriatic Sea.

In 16 BC, the legion was transferred to Emona (now Ljubljana) in Pannonia, where it dealt with local rebellions.

After the disaster of the Battle of the Teutoburg Forest in AD 9, the legion was sent as reinforcements to Augusta Vindelicorum (Augsburg), and then to Vindonissa, Raetia, to prevent further attacks from the Germanic tribes.

Emperor Claudius sent them back to Pannonia around 45 and the legion built its legionary fortress at Poetovium (modern Ptuj, Slovenia).

In the year of the four emperors (69), XIII Gemina supported first Otho and then Vespasian against Vitellius, fighting in the two Battles of Bedriacum. After their defeat in the first battle, the victorious Vitellius forced the legion to build an amphitheatre in the city of Bononia.

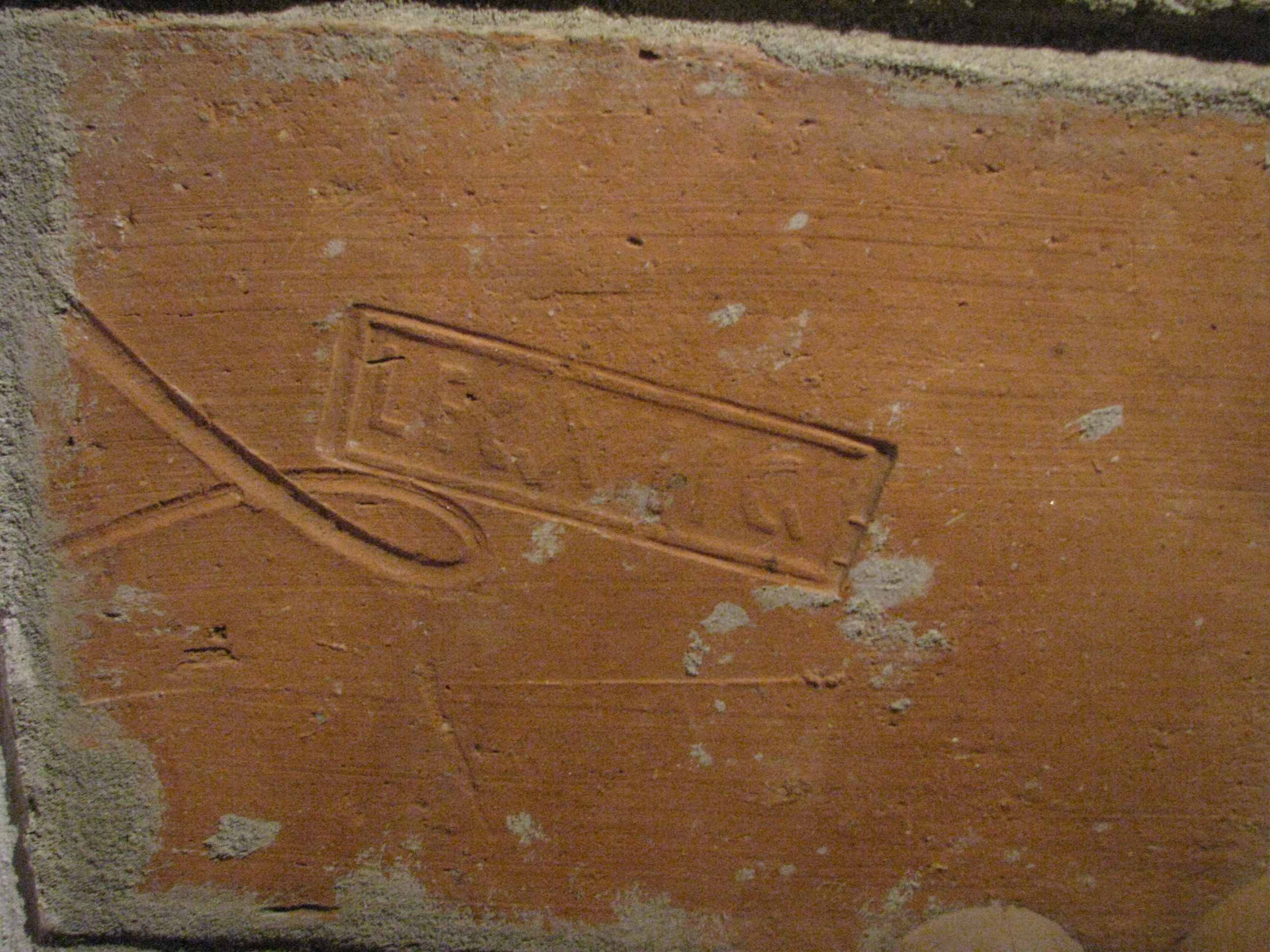
Stamped brick found at Alba Iulia, Romania

Under Trajan the legion took part in both Dacian wars (101–102, 105–106), and it was transferred by Trajan in 106 to the newly conquered province of Dacia (in Apulum, modern Alba Iulia, Romania) to garrison it.

Vexillationes of the XIII Gemina fought under Emperor Gallienus in northern Italy. The emperor issued a legionary antoninianus celebrating the legion, and showing the legion's lion (259–260). Another vexillatio was present in the army of the emperor of the Gallic Empire Victorinus: this emperor, in fact, issued a gold coin celebrating the legion and its emblem.

In 271, the legion was relocated when the Dacia province was evacuated, and restationed in Dacia Aureliana.

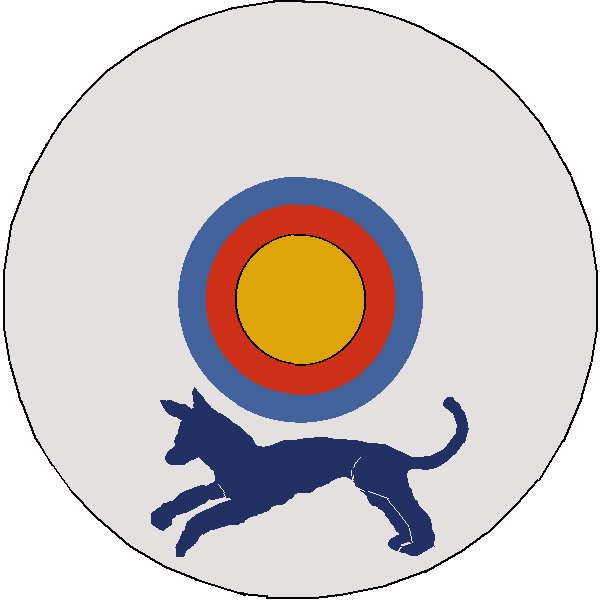
Shield pattern of Legio XII Gemina in the early 5th century

In the 5th century, according to the Notitia Dignitatum, a legio tertiadecima gemina was in Babylon in Egypt, a strategic fortress on the Nile at the traditional border between Lower Egypt and Middle Egypt, under the command of the Comes limitis Aegypti.

== Attested members ==
Name	Rank	Time frame	Province	Soldier located in	Veteran located in	Source
Aurelius Rufinus	beneficiarius	2nd – 3rd century AD	Dacia	Samum		
M. Valerius Valentinus	beneficiarius	2nd – 3rd century AD	Dacia	Samum	-	CIL III, 827
Valerius Vibius Valerianus	beneficiarius	2nd – 3rd century AD	Dacia	Samum	-	CIL III, 823
Ulpius Bacchius	centurion	?	?	?	?	?
L. Valerius Rufus	decurion	after 222 AD	?	?	Sarmizegetusa Ulpia Traiana, Dacia	CIL III, 1485
Vedius Aquila	legatus	69				Tacitus, Histories, III.7
Aelius Vitalis	duplarius	3rd century AD	Dacia	Apulum	Antiochia ad Taurum, Syria?	
Aurelius Valerianus	duplarius	3rd century AD	Dacia	Apulum	Antiochia ad Taurum, Syria?	
Aulus Julius Pompilius Piso	legatus	c. 173				CIL VIII, 2582 = ILS 1111
Marcus Valerius Maximianus	legatus	c. 182				AE 1956, 124
Gaius Caerellius Sabinus	legatus	c. 183 - c. 185				CIL III, 1092
Proculus	legatus	between 185 and 191				
Tiberius Manilius Fuscus	legatus	191-c. 193				CIL III, 1172
Aulus Terentius Pudens Uttedianus	legatus	between 198 and 209				CIL III, 993 = ILS 3923
Quintus Marcius Victor Felix Maximillianus	legatus	reign of Septimius Severus				CIL III, 1118
Lucius Annius Italicus Honoratus	legatus	reign of Caracalla				CIL III, 1071, CIL III, 1072
Rufrius Sulpicianus	legatus	reign of Caracalla or Elagabalus				CIL III, 1129 = ILS 3867
Quintus Servaeus Fuscus Cornelianus	legatus	c. 225				CIL VIII, 22721 = ILS 8978 = ILTun 33
Marcus Valerius Longinus	legatus	reign of Alexander Severus				CIL III, 1019, CIL III, 1020
Gaius Rutilius Gallicus	military tribune	c. 52				AE 1920, 55
L. Maecius L.f. Postumus	military tribune	c. 72				AE 1934, 248
C. Caelius C.f. Martialis	military tribune	before 106				AE 1934, 2
Sextus Julius Severus	military tribune	before 110				CIL III, 2830 = ILS 1056
Aulus Junius Pastor	military tribune	c. 149				CIL VI, 1435
Aulus Julius Pompilius Piso	military tribune	c. 165				CIL VIII, 2582 = ILS 1111
Quintus Hedius Lollianus Plautius Avitus	military tribune	c. 192	Dacia			CIL V, 4347 = ILS 1149
Publius Catius Sabinus	military tribune	before 206	Dacia			CIL III, 5727
C. Cassio C. f. Volt[inia]	military tribune	?	?	?	-	?
Caius	speculator	2nd – 3rd century AD	Dacia	Apulum	-	CIL III, 14479; IDR III/5, 426
Cocceius	speculator	2nd – 3rd century AD	Dacia	Apulum	-	CIL III, 14479; IDR III/5, 426
C. Iulius Valerius	?	222 – 235 AD	Dacia ?	?	Sarmizegetusa Ulpia Traiana, Dacia	CIL III, 1933
Lucius Dasumius Priscus	veteran	2nd century AD	?	?	Sarmizegetusa Ulpia Traiana, Dacia	CIL III, 1476
Lucius Furius	?	1st century AD	Gallia Aquitania	Mediolanum Santonum	Aunedonnacum	
Lucius Autius	?	1st century AD	Gallia Aquitania	Mediolanum Santonum	Aunedonnacum	
Marcus Aurelius Timoni	?	2nd - 3rd century AD	Dacia ?	Castra of Sânnicolau Mare ?	Castra of Sânnicolau Mare, Dacia	IDR III/1, 274
M[arcus] Ulp[ius]	?	2nd – 3rd century AD	Dacia	?	Apulum	IDR III/5, 180
P. Aelius Valerianus	speculator	2nd - 3rd century AD	Dacia	Apulum	-	IDR III/5, 721
Publius Urvinus	?	?	Raetia	Augusta Vindelicorum ?	-	CIL XIII, 6884
Q. Julius Secundinus	veteran	2nd century AD	Dacia ?	?	Sarmizegetusa Ulpia Traiana, Dacia	
Statius Alexander	speculator	2nd – 3rd century AD	Dacia	Apulum	-	Apulum 40, 2007, 176–177
Ulpius Proculinus	speculator	Gordian's reign	Dacia	Apulum	-	CIL III, 7794b; IDR III/5, 435

== Epigraphic inscriptions ==
- - Caio Iulio Galeria (tribu) Lepido Iessonensi primi pilari centurioni legionis XIII Geminae Piae Fidelis centurioni (...). Lerida (Ilerda), Spain. CIL II 4463.

== Fictional depictions ==
- A fictionalized account of the actions of Legio XIII Gemina during the struggle between Julius Caesar and the Optimates faction under Pompey can be seen in the joint HBO/BBC/RAI television production Rome, most notably two of its soldiers: Centurion Lucius Vorenus and Legionary Titus Pullo, named after real-life Centurions Lucius Vorenus and Titus Pullo of the Legio XI Claudia. The show includes a fictional incident where the legion's eagle standard is stolen by the Gaulish brigands.

== In popular culture ==
The cognomen of Legio XIII Gemina was adopted as the honorary name of the Romanian 4th Infantry Division in 2008.

Golfer Jon Rahm called his LIV Golf team Legion XIII after the Legio XIII Gemina.

== See also ==
- Roman legion
- List of Roman legions
- Dacia Ripensis
