= Siege of Massilia =

49 BC siege by forces loyal to Caesar

- Part of Caesar's Civil War
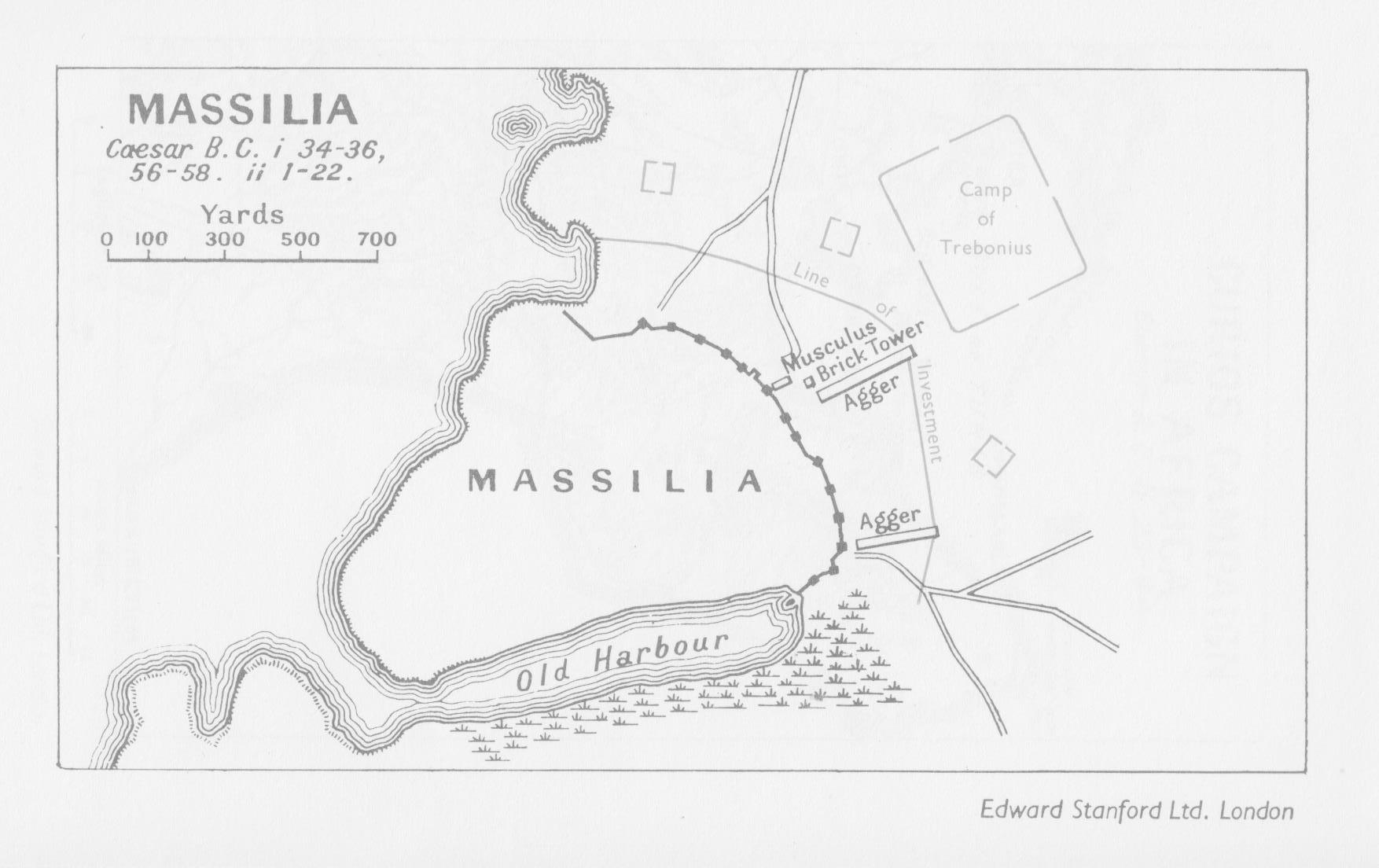
- Map of the siege
Date	19 April – 6 September 49 BC (4 months, 2 weeks and 4 days)
Location	Massilia and Western Mediterranean Sea 43.29°N 5.37°E
Result	Caesarian victory
Territorial changes	Roman annexation of Massilia

Belligerents
Supporters of Julius Caesar	City of Massilia; Supporters of Pompey

Commanders and leaders
Gaius Trebonius (siege); Decimus Brutus (naval blockade)	L. Domitius Ahenobarbus

Units involved
Legio XVII, XVIII and XIX	Militia of Massilia

Strength
Land forces: c. 15,000 legionaries (3 legions); Naval: 12−22 ships: Initially: 12 ships; After the first naval engagement: 18 ships; After the second naval engagement: 22 ships	Land forces: c. 8,000 militia Naval: 17–34 ships: 17 ships during the first naval engagement; 34 ships during the second naval engagement (16 of these were Nasidius's)

Casualties and losses
1,100 killed	4,000 killed

The siege of Massilia, including two naval engagements, was an episode of Caesar's Civil War, fought in 49 BC between forces loyal to the Optimates and a detachment of Caesar's army. The siege was conducted by Gaius Trebonius, one of Caesar's senior legates, while the naval operations were in the capable hands of Decimus Brutus, Caesar's naval expert.

== Siege ==
Lucius Domitius Ahenobarbus had become proconsul of Gaul and was sent to gain control of Massilia (modern Marseille) in order to oppose Caesar. As Caesar marched to Hispania (en route to confront Pompey's legions), the Massiliots closed their gates to him, having allied with Ahenobarbus and the Optimates. Roused by their hostile actions, he commenced a siege against Massilia, leaving the newly raised XVII, XVIII, and XIX legions to conduct the siege under the command of Gaius Trebonius. He also placed Decimus Brutus in charge of his fleet there. Caesar himself marched with his veteran legions to Hispania to fight the Pompeian generals Lucius Afranius and Marcus Petreius. He would return to the siege of Massilia after defeating his opponents at the battle of Ilerda.

After the siege had begun, Ahenobarbus arrived in Massilia to defend it against the Caesarian forces. In late June, Caesar's ships, although they were less skilfully built than those of the Massiliots and outnumbered, were victorious in the ensuing naval battle.

Gaius Trebonius conducted the siege using a variety of siege machines including siege towers, a siege-ramp, and a "testudo-ram". According to Caesar, the besiegers required additional wood for the construction of siege engines, compelling Trebonius to issue a requisition for more supplies. This incident parallels an account from the 1st-century CE poet Lucan, who describes Caesar as having been personally attendant to the destruction of a sacred grove outside the city. Within Lucan's poem, Caesar is motivated to cut down the grove so as to harvest timber for the construction of siege engines. This particular story from Lucan is almost certainly fictitious: Caesar could not have been present for this particular event, as he was in Spain at the time, though Caesar was present for a separate moment—also during the siege of Massalia—when timber was harvested. Even still, there is no other surviving account of the civil war that mentions any incident similar to the one described by Lucan, naturally calling into question the veracity of this tale. It is likely that Lucan fabricated the entire story on the basis of the singular fact that the Caesarian troops needed wood.

Gaius Scribonius Curio, careless in adequately guarding the Sicilian Straits, allowed Lucius Nasidius to bring more ships to the aid of Ahenobarbus. He fought a second naval battle with Decimus Brutus in early September, but withdrew defeated and sailed for Hispania.

Trebonius built a stationary tower, 30 feet (9.1 m) square and six stories in height, under the very walls of the city and in the face of a rain of missiles from its engines. The walls of the tower were of brickwork 5 feet (1.5 m) thick. When the lowest storey was built it was covered with a solid fireproof roof which was not secured to the walls but rested upon them like a lid. The eaves projected considerably, and from them screens were hung on all sides, covering all the walls. By means of screws the whole canopy, roof, and screens was now raised to the height of one storey and the workmen proceeded to build the walls of that storey under its protection. This process was repeated in the same manner until the full height of the tower was attained.

The Massiliots valiantly defended against the siege machines and works. They threw down burning pitch and pine-shavings and the Caesarians undermined the foundations of their city walls. At one point they seemed likely to surrender and declare a truce, but at night they cunningly destroyed the siege works in a gross violation of the treaty, according to Caesar's own account (Bellum Civile 2.14; alternatively, Dio 41.25.2 records that the Massiliots destroyed these works in response to a surprise attack by the Caesarian forces). The city's inhabitants were then near surrender.

At the final surrender of Massilia, Caesar showed his usual leniency and Lucius Ahenobarbus fled to Thessaly in the only vessel that was able to escape from the Populares. Afterwards, Massilia was allowed to keep nominal autonomy, due to ancient ties of friendship and support of Rome, along with some territories while most of its empire was confiscated by Julius Caesar.
