= Corfinium =

Ancient Italian city

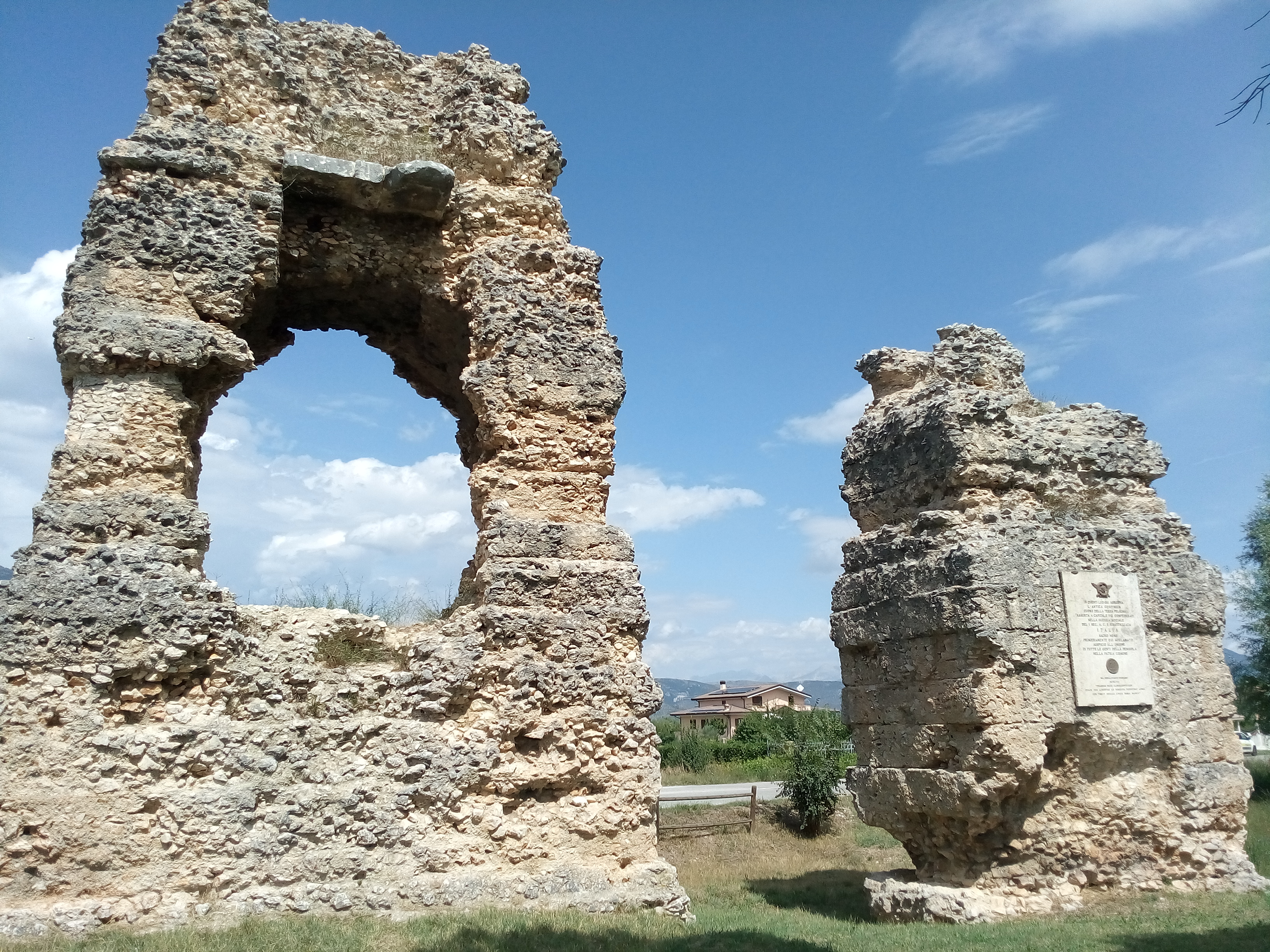
- Roman monumental tombs

- Location within Abruzzo
- 42.1226074°N 13.84090786°E
- Cultures: Ancient Rome
- Location: Cansano
- Region: Abruzzo

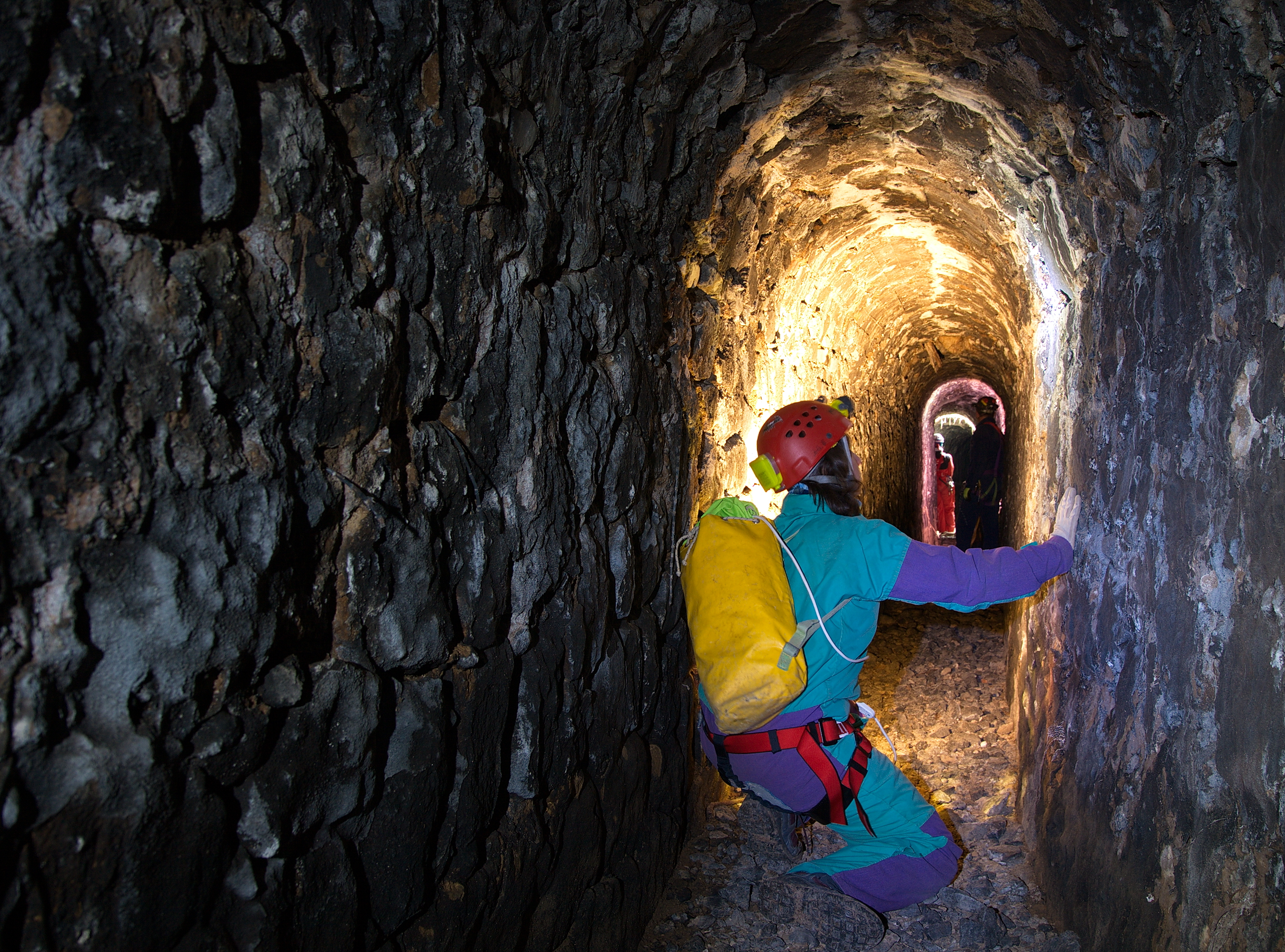
Aqueduct of Corfinium

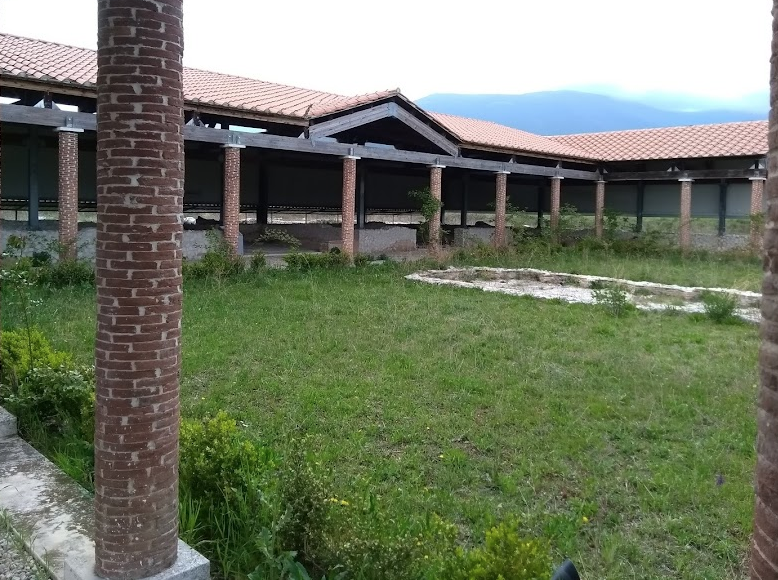
Villa at Corfinium

Corfinium was an ancient city now near modern Corfinio, in the province of L'Aquila (Abruzzo region).

During the Social War (91-87 BC), Corfinium served as the headquarters of the Italic socii who fought for the extension of Roman citizenship to all of Italy.

== History ==
Corfinium was the capital of the Paeligni, situated in the valley of the Aternus, near the point where that river's course suddenly makes a sharp turn and runs from southeasterly to northeasterly on towards the Adriatic Sea. It was 7 miles from Sulmo (modern Sulmona), and 30 from Alba Fucens by the Via Valeria.

Its name is first mentioned at the outbreak of the Social War, in 90 BC, when it was selected by the confederates to be their common capital, and the seat of their government. It was probably its military position that led to this distinction; but the allies seem to have destined it to be the permanent capital of Italy, and the rival of Rome, as they changed its name to Italica, and adorned it with a new and spacious forum and senate house, and other public buildings of a style corresponding to its intended greatness. But before the end of the second year of the war they were compelled to abandon their new capital, and transfer the seat of government to Aesernia (modern Isernia).

Corfinium probably fell into the hands of the Romans without resistance, and as a strong fortress it was occupied by Lucius Domitius Ahenobarbus (consul 54 BC) with 31 cohorts, and was the only place which offered any effective resistance to Caesar during his advance through Italy. Disaffection amongst his officers compelled Domitius to surrender after the Siege of Corfinium of only seven days. Along with the garrison, several important Republicans were also captured, whom Caesar released after obtaining their oaths of loyalty, oaths many promptly broke.

At the outbreak of the Civil War between Julius Caesar and Pompey, 49 BC, it retained its position as a city of importance and a strong fortress.

Inscriptions indicate that it continued to be a flourishing municipal town under the Roman Empire, and its prosperity is proved by the fact that its inhabitants were able to construct two aqueducts for supplying it with water, both of which are in great part hewn in the solid rock, and one of them is carried through a tunnel nearly 5 km (3.1 mi) in length.

A part of the territory of Corfinium had been portioned out to new settlers as early as the time of the Gracchi: it received a fresh body of colonists under Augustus, but never assumed the title of a colony, all inscriptions giving it that of a municipium only. It still appears in the Itineraries as a place of importance, and even seems to have been in the fourth century regarded as the capital of the province of Valeria, and the residence of its Praeses or governor. The period of its destruction is unknown, but it seems to have been still in existence as late as the tenth century.

It was later known as Pentima then medieval Valva (the adjoining valley is still called La Pianata di Valva). It re-took the ancient name in 1928.

== Archaeology ==
Ruins of Corfinium have been found around the modern town of Corfinio.

The bridge over the Aternus, 5 km (3.1 mi) from the city, is mentioned both by Caesar and Strabo, and must always have been a military point of the highest importance. This bridge must evidently be the same, close to which the modern town of Popoli has grown up; leading to the erroneous supposition by some authors that Popoli, rather than San Pelino, occupies the site of Corfinium.
