= Lucius Domitius Ahenobarbus (consul 54 BC) =

Roman senator and general

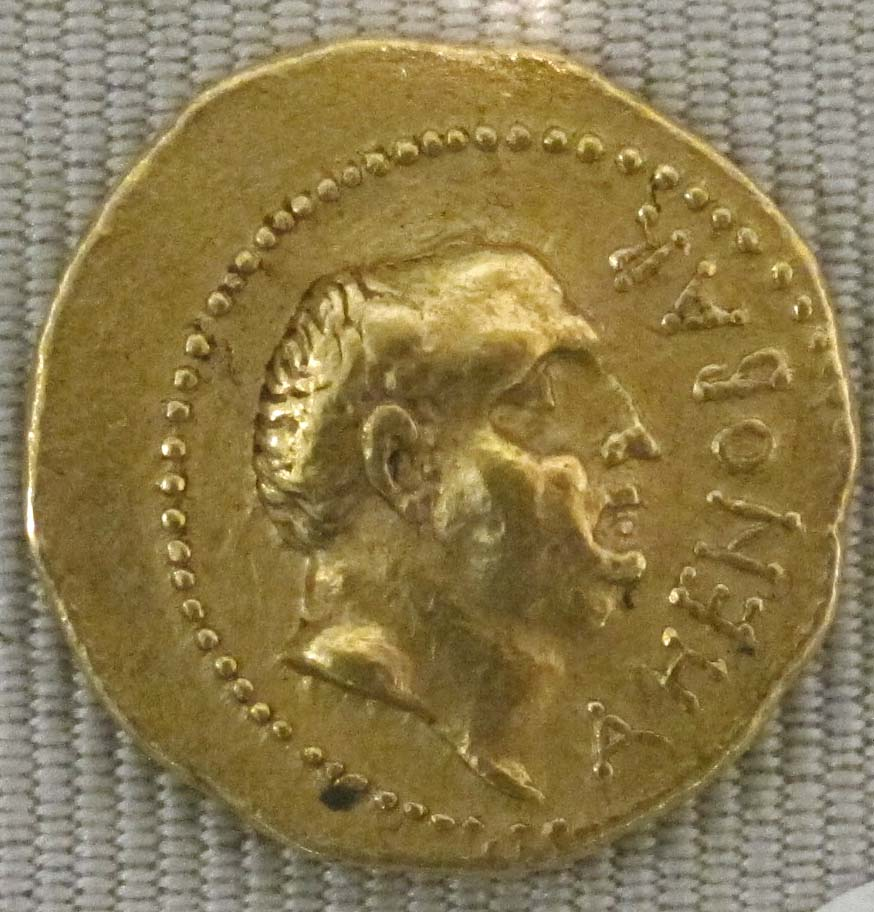
- Born: c. 98 BC
- Died: 9 August 48 BC; Palaepharsalus, Greece
- Cause of death: Killed in battle
- Office: Curule Aedile (61 BC); Praetor (58 BC); Consul (54 BC)
- Spouse: Porcia
- Children: Gnaeus (consul 32 BC)

Military service
- Allegiance: Pompey
- Rank: Proconsul
- Battles/wars: Caesar's Civil War; Siege of Corfinium (49 BC); Siege of Massilia (49 BC); Battle of Tauroento (49 BC); Battle of Pharsalus (48 BC) †

Lucius Domitius Ahenobarbus, consul in 54 BC, was an enemy of Julius Caesar and a strong supporter of the aristocratic (optimates) party in the late Roman Republic. He was Nero's great-great-grandfather.

== Biography ==
Ahenobarbus was born c. 98 BC as the son of consul Gnaeus Domitius Ahenobarbus. His grandfather Gnaeus Domitius Ahenobarbus was a general and consul who led a campaign to conquer southern Gaul against the Allobroges.

He is first mentioned in 70 BC by Cicero as a witness against Verres. In 61, he was curule aedile, when he exhibited a hundred Numidian lions, and continued the games so long that the people were obliged to leave the circus before the exhibition was over, in order to take food, which was the first time they had done so. This pause in the games was called diludium.

He married Porcia, the sister of Cato the Younger, and in his aedileship supported the latter in his proposals against bribery at elections, which were directed against Pompey, who was purchasing votes for Afranius. The political opinions of Ahenobarbus coincided with those of Cato; throughout his life he was one of the strongest supporters of the aristocratic party. He took an active part opposing the measures of Julius Caesar and Pompey, and in 59 was accused, at the instigation of Caesar, of being an accomplice to the pretended conspiracy against Pompey's life.

Ahenobarbus was praetor in 58. He was a candidate for the consulship of 55, and threatened that in his consulship he would carry out the measures he had proposed in his praetorship, and deprive Caesar of his province. He was defeated, however, by Pompey and Crassus, who also ran for the consulship, and was driven from the Campus Martius on the day of election by force of arms. He became a candidate again in the following year, and Caesar and Pompey, whose power was firmly established, did not oppose him. He was accordingly elected consul for 54 with Appius Claudius Pulcher, a relation of Pompey, so he was not able to effect anything against Caesar and Pompey. Both men were involved in an election scandal that year. He did not go to a province at the expiration of his consulship; and as the friendship between Caesar and Pompey cooled, he became closely allied with the latter.

Ahenobarbus was the elected magistrate presiding over the trial against Titus Annius Milo in 52 for the murder of Publius Clodius, as related by Asconius' summary of Cicero's "Pro Milone". For the next two or three years during Cicero's absence in Cilicia, information about Ahenobarbus is principally derived from the letters of his enemy Coelius to Cicero. In 50, he was a candidate for the place in the college of augurs left vacant by the death of Quintus Hortensius, but was defeated by Mark Antony through the influence of Caesar.

The senate appointed him to succeed Caesar as governor of the province of further Gaul, and on the march of Caesar into Italy in 49, he was the only one of the aristocratic party who showed any energy or courage. He threw himself into Corfinium with about thirty cohorts, expecting to be supported by Pompey; but as the latter did nothing to assist him, his own troops compelled him to surrender to Caesar after a seven day siege. Despairing of life, he ordered his doctor to give to him poison, but the latter gave him only a sleeping draught. His soldiers were incorporated into Caesar's army, but Ahenobarbus was dismissed by Caesar uninjured − an act of clemency which he did not expect, and which he would himself certainly not have shown had he instead been the victor.

Ahenobarbus' feelings against Caesar remained unaltered, but he was too deeply offended by the conduct of Pompey to join him immediately. He retired for a short time to Cosa in Etruria, and afterwards sailed to Massilia, which he defended against Caesar. He prosecuted the war vigorously against Caesar, but the town was eventually taken, and Ahenobarbus escaped in the only vessel that was able to get away from the town.

Ahenobarbus then proceeded east and joined Pompey in Thessaly, and proposed that, after the war, all senators who had remained neutral should be brought to trial. Cicero, whom he branded as a coward, was not a little afraid of him. Ahenobarbus was killed just after the Battle of Pharsalus in 48, in which he commanded the right wing against Mark Antony, who, according to Cicero, struck the blow that killed him. He was struck down while trying to escape. Ahenobarbus was a man of great energy of character; he remained firm in his political principles, but was unscrupulous in the means he employed to maintain them.

The poet Lucan makes Lucius Domitius Ahenobarbus a significant character in book 7 of his Pharsalia (he is called "Domitius"). Domitius is significant in the poem because he is the only known senator who died supporting Pompey at Pharsalia, and thus is a symbol of the dying republic. Additionally, Lucius Domitius Ahenobarbus is Nero's great-great-grandfather and shares Nero's birth name.

He was the father of Gnaeus Domitius Ahenobarbus, who served as consul in 32 BC.

== See also ==
- List of Roman consuls

Political offices
Preceded by Pompey II; M. Licinius Crassus II	Roman consul 54 BC; With: Appius Claudius Pulcher	Succeeded by Gn. Domitius Calvinus; M. Valerius Messalla Rufus
