= Roman Republic =

Period of Roman history (c. 509 – 27 BC)

Roman Republic Res publica Romana
- c. 509 – 27 BC
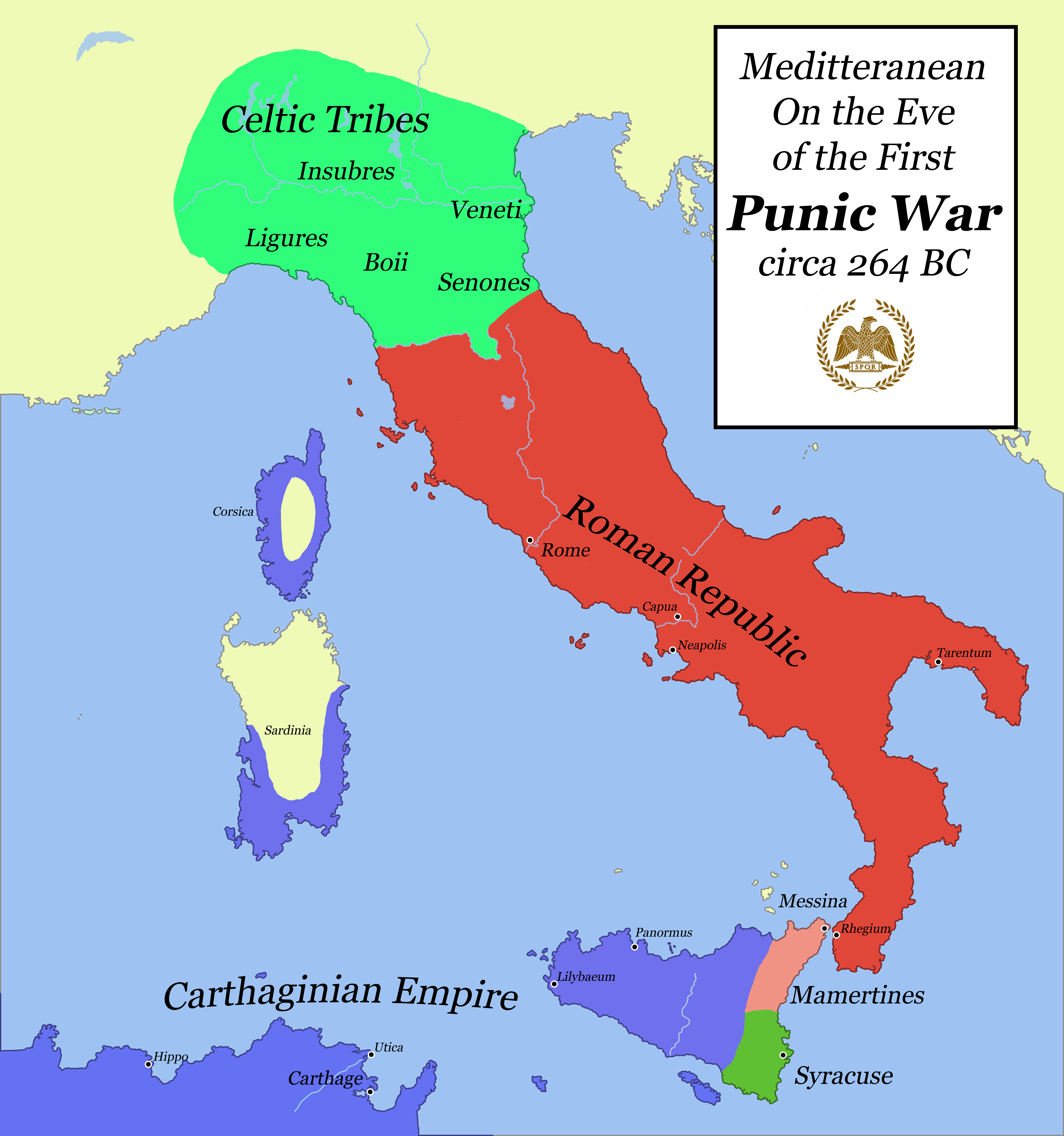
- Capital: Rome
- Official languages: Latin
- Religion: Roman polytheism
- Demonym: Roman
- Government: Consular republic
- Consuls
  - 509 BC (first): L. Junius Brutus; L. Tarquinius Collatinus
  - 27 BC (last): Octavian; Marcus Agrippa
- Legislature: Assemblies
- Historical era: Classical antiquity
  - Overthrow of the monarchy: c. 509 BC
  - Dissolution of the Latin League: 338 BC
  - Sulla named dictator: November 82 BC
  - Julius Caesar named dictator for life: February 44 BC
  - Assassination of Julius Caesar: 15 March 44 BC
  - Battle of Actium: 2 September 31 BC
  - Octavian proclaimed Augustus: 16 January 27 BC

Area
- 326 BC: 10,000 km^{2} (3,900 sq mi)
- 50 BC: 1,950,000 km^{2} (750,000 sq mi)
Preceded by	Succeeded by
Roman Kingdom	Roman Empire

The Roman Republic (Latin: Res publica Romana, pronounced [ˈreːs ˈpuːblɪka roːˈmaːna]) was the era of classical Roman civilisation beginning with the overthrow of the Roman Kingdom (traditionally dated to 509 BC) and ending in 27 BC with the establishment of the Roman Empire following the War of Actium. During this period, Rome's control expanded from the city's immediate surroundings to hegemony over the entire Mediterranean world.

Roman society at the time was primarily a cultural mix of Latin and Etruscan societies, as well as of Sabine, Oscan, and Greek cultural elements, which is especially visible in the ancient Roman religion and its pantheon. Its political organisation developed at around the same time as direct democracy in ancient Greece, with collective and annual magistracies, overseen by a senate. There were annual elections, but the republican system was an elective oligarchy, not a true democracy, with a number of powerful families largely monopolising the senior magistracies. Roman institutions underwent considerable changes throughout the Republic to adapt to difficulties such as the creation of promagistracies to rule its conquered provinces and, after the Social War during the late Republic, the inclusion of peninsular Italians as citizens and senators.

Unlike the Pax Romana of the Roman Empire, republican Rome was in a state of near-perpetual war. Its first enemies were its Latin and Etruscan neighbours, as well as the Gauls, who sacked Rome around 387 BC. After the Gallic sack, Rome conquered most of the Italian peninsula in a century and became one of the Mediterranean great powers. Its greatest strategic rival was Carthage, against which it waged three wars. Rome defeated Carthage at the Battle of Zama in 202 BC and in the following decades became the dominant power in the ancient Mediterranean world. It then embarked on a long series of difficult conquests, defeating Philip V and Perseus of Macedon, Antiochus III of the Seleucid Empire, the Lusitanian Viriathus, the Numidian Jugurtha, the Pontic king Mithridates VI, Vercingetorix of the Arverni tribe of Gaul, and the Egyptian queen Cleopatra.

At home, during the Conflict of the Orders, the patricians, the closed oligarchic elite, came into conflict with the more numerous plebs; this was resolved peacefully, with the plebs achieving political equality by the 4th century BC. The late Republic, from 133 BC onward, saw substantial domestic strife, often anachronistically seen as a conflict between optimates and populares, referring to conservative and reformist politicians, respectively. The Social War between Rome and its Italian allies over citizenship and Roman hegemony in Italy greatly expanded the scope of civil violence. Mass slavery also contributed to three Servile Wars. Political violence at home coupled with powerful semi-autonomous generals led to civil wars that broke the Republic. The first involved Marius and Sulla. After a generation, the Republic fell into civil war again in 49 BC between Julius Caesar and Pompey. Despite his victory and appointment as dictator for life, Caesar was assassinated in 44 BC. Caesar's heir Octavian and lieutenant Mark Antony defeated Caesar's assassins in 42 BC, but they split, eventually resulting in Antony's defeat alongside his ally and lover Cleopatra at the Battle of Actium in 31 BC. Octavian, the victor, then became the dominant force in Roman politics; Octavian's receipt of the title Augustus from the Senate in 27 BC is often seen to mark the end of the Republic and the beginning of the Roman Empire.

== History ==
=== Founding ===
Rome had been ruled by monarchs since its foundation. These monarchs were elected, for life, by the men of the Roman Senate. The last Roman monarch was called Tarquin the Proud, who in traditional histories was expelled from Rome in 509 BC because his son, Sextus Tarquinius, raped a noblewoman, Lucretia. The tradition asserted that the monarchy was abolished in a revolution led by the semi-mythical Lucius Junius Brutus and the king's powers were then transferred to two separate consuls elected to office for a term of one year; each was capable of checking his colleague by veto. Most modern scholarship describes these accounts as the quasi-mythological detailing of an aristocratic coup within Tarquin's own family or a consequence of an Etruscan occupation of Rome rather than a popular revolution.

=== Rome in Latium ===
==== Early campaigns ====
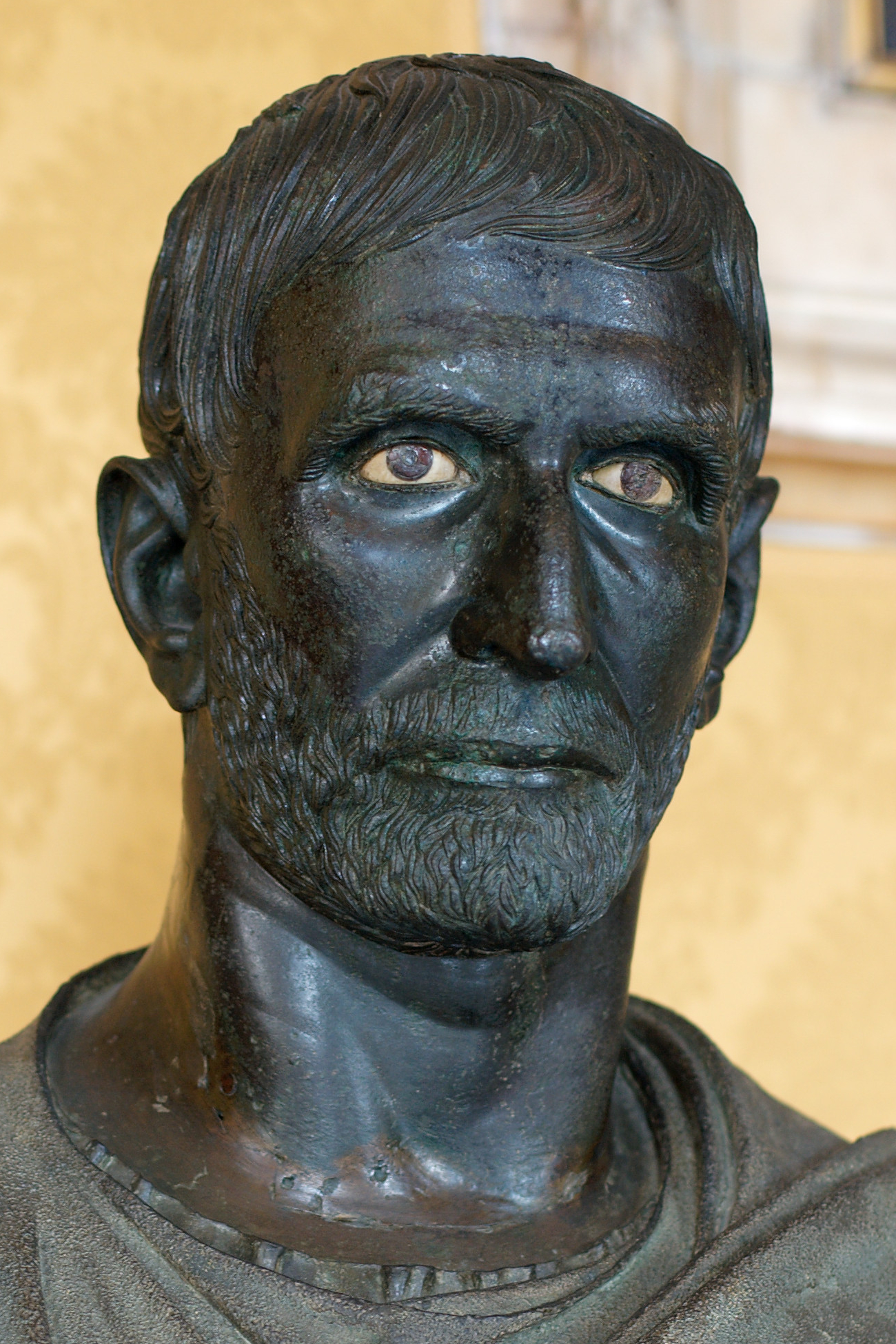
The "Capitoline Brutus", a bust possibly depicting Lucius Junius Brutus, who led the revolt against Rome's last king and was a founder of the Republic

Animated overview of the Roman territorial history from the Roman Republic until the fall of its last remnant the Byzantine Empire in 1453 at the end of the post-classical era

According to Rome's traditional histories, Tarquin made several attempts to retake the throne, including the Tarquinian conspiracy, which involved Brutus's own sons, the war with Veii and Tarquinii, and finally the war between Rome and Clusium. The attempts to restore the monarchy did not succeed.

The first Roman republican wars were wars of expansion. One by one, Rome defeated both the persistent Sabines and the local cities. Rome defeated its rival Latin cities in the Battle of Lake Regillus in 496 BC, the Battle of Ariccia in 495 BC, the Battle of Mount Algidus in 458 BC, and the Battle of Corbio in 446 BC. But it suffered a significant defeat at the Battle of the Cremera in 477 BC, wherein it fought against the most important Etruscan city, Veii; this defeat was later avenged at the Battle of Veii in 396 BC, wherein Rome destroyed the city. By the end of this period, Rome had effectively completed the conquest of its immediate Etruscan and Latin neighbours and secured its position against the immediate threat posed by the nearby Apennine hill tribes.

==== Plebeians and patricians ====
Beginning with their revolt against Tarquin, and continuing through the early years of the Republic, Rome's patrician aristocrats were the dominant force in politics and society. They initially formed a closed group of about 50 large families, called gentes, who monopolised Rome's magistracies, state priesthoods, and senior military posts. The most prominent of these families were the Cornelii, Aemilii, Claudii, Fabii, and Valerii. The leading families' power, privilege and influence derived from their wealth, in particular from their landholdings, their position as patrons, and their numerous clients.

The vast majority of Roman citizens were commoners of various social degrees. They formed the backbone of Rome's economy, as smallholding farmers, managers, artisans, traders, and tenants. In wartime, they could be summoned for military service. Most had little direct political influence. During the early Republic, the plebs (or plebeians) emerged as a self-organised, culturally distinct group of commoners, with its own internal hierarchy, laws, customs, and interests. Plebeians had no access to high religious and civil office. (Note: Several historians, notably Tim Cornell, have challenged this view, saying that in the early Republic the Fasti Consulares bear names that are distinctively plebeian. Therefore, they claim that the plebeians were only excluded from higher offices by the Decemvirate in 451 BC. More recently, Corey Brennan has dismissed this theory, arguing that the consular plebeians would not have let the Decemvirs take their power away that easily. Cf Brennan 2000, pp. 24–25. He attributes the "plebeian" names in the fasti to patrician gentes who later died out or became plebeians.) For the poorest, one of the few effective political tools was their withdrawal of labour and services, in a secessio plebis; the first such secession occurred in 494 BC, in protest at the abusive treatment of plebeian debtors by the wealthy during a famine. (Note: The traditional date for the first secession is given by Livy as 494; many other dates have been suggested, and several such events probably took place. See Cornell 1995, pp. 215–218, 256–261, 266.) The patrician Senate was compelled to give them direct access to the written civil and religious laws and to the electoral and political process. To represent their interests, the plebs elected tribunes, who were personally sacrosanct, immune to arbitrary arrest by any magistrate, and had veto power over legislation. (Note: For a discussion of the duties and legal status of plebeian tribunes and aediles, see Lintott, Violence 1999, pp. 92–101)

==== Celtic invasion of Italy ====
By 390 BC, several Gallic tribes were invading Italy from the north. The Romans met the Gauls in pitched battle at the Battle of Allia River around 390–387 BC. The battle was fought at the confluence of the Tiber and Allia rivers, 11 Roman miles (10 mi or 16 km) north of Rome. The Romans were routed and subsequently Rome was sacked by the Senones. There is no destruction layer at Rome around this time indicating that, if a sack occurred, it was largely superficial.

=== Roman expansion in Italy ===
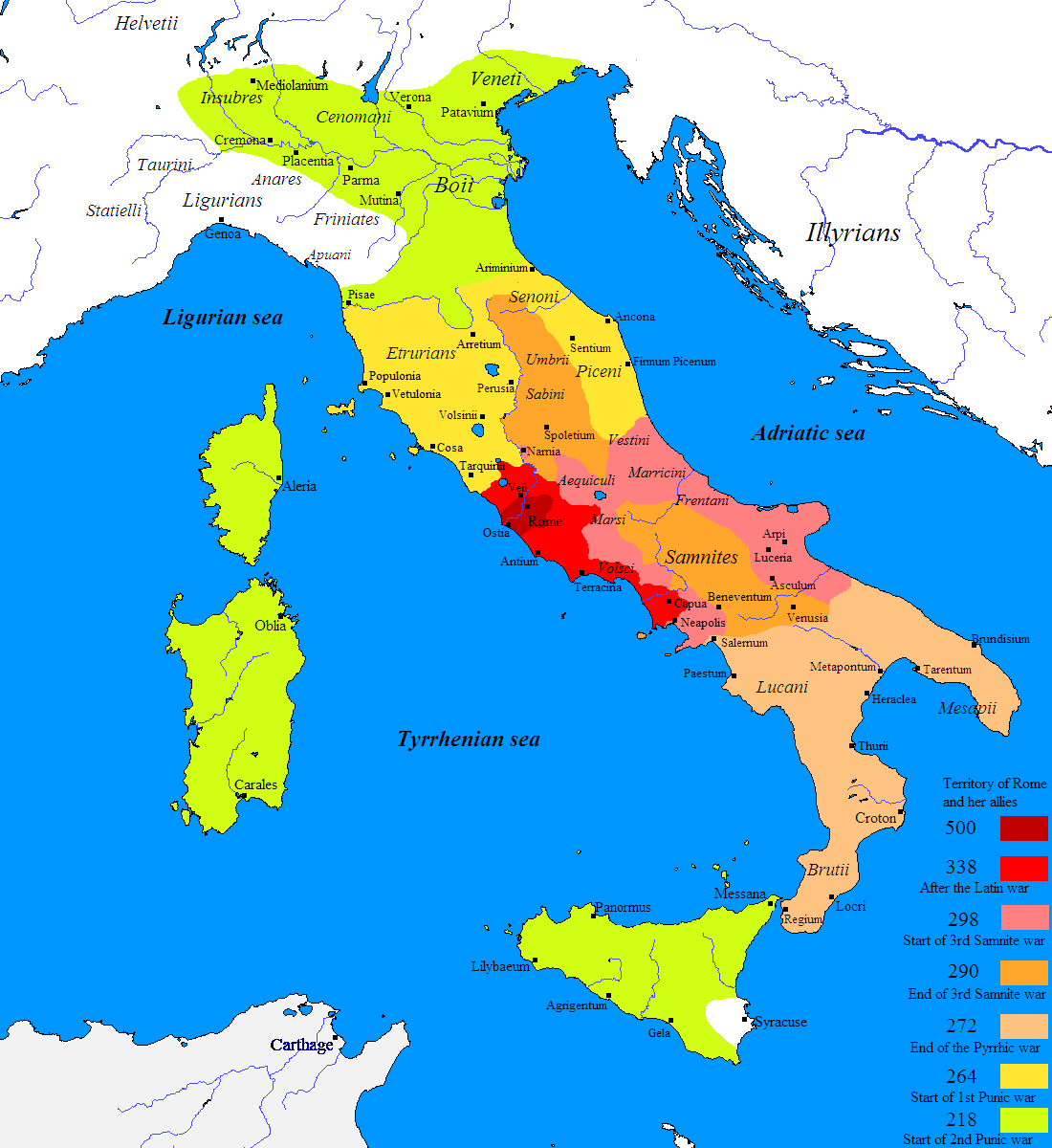
Roman expansion in Italy from 500 to 218 BC through the Latin War (light red), Samnite Wars (pink/orange), Pyrrhic War (beige), and First and Second Punic wars (yellow and green). Cisalpine Gaul (238–146 BC) and Alpine valleys (16–7 BC) were later added. The Roman Republic in 500 BC is marked with dark red.

==== Wars against Italian neighbours ====
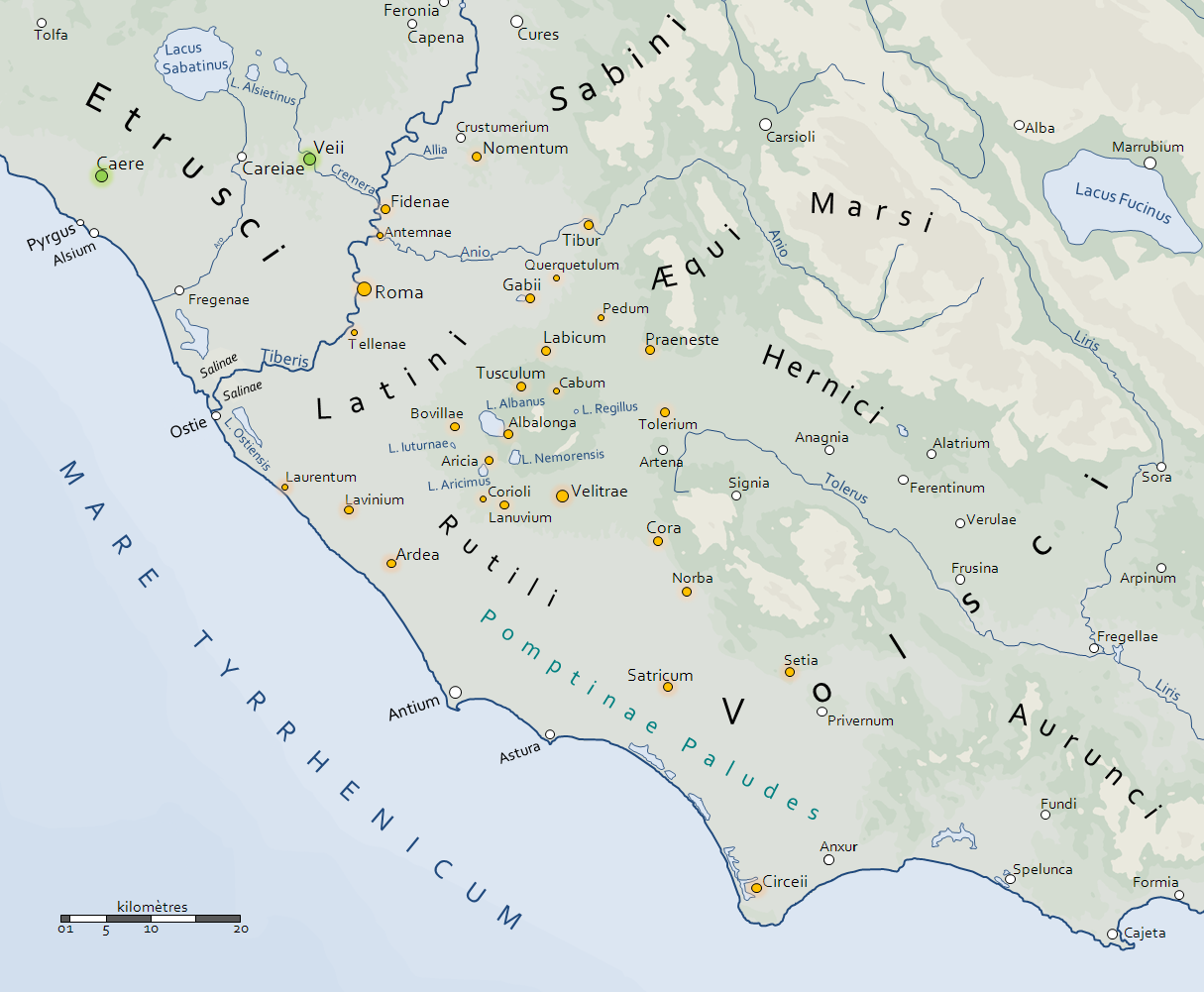
The Latin League before Rome's expansion

From 343 to 341 BC, Rome won two battles against its Samnite neighbours, but was unable to consolidate its gains, due to the outbreak of war with former Latin allies. In the Latin War (340–338 BC), Rome defeated a coalition of Latins at the battles of Vesuvius and the Trifanum. The Latins submitted to Roman rule.

A Second Samnite War began in 327 BC. The war ended with Samnite defeat at the Battle of Bovianum in 305 BC. By 304 BC, Rome had annexed most Samnite territory and begun to establish colonies there, but in 298 BC the Samnites rebelled, and defeated a Roman army, in a Third Samnite War. After this success, it built a coalition of several previous enemies of Rome. The war ended with Roman victory in 290 BC.

At the Battle of Populonia, in 282 BC, Rome finished off the last vestiges of Etruscan power in the region.

==== Rise of the plebeian nobility ====
In the 4th century, plebeians gradually obtained political equality with patricians. The first plebeian consular tribunes were elected in 400. The reason behind this sudden gain is unknown, (Note: It has nevertheless been speculated that Lucius Atilius Luscus in 444, and Quintus Antonius Meranda in 422 were also plebeian.) but it was limited as patrician tribunes retained preeminence over their plebeian colleagues. In 385 BC, the former consul and saviour of the besieged capital, Marcus Manlius Capitolinus, is said to have sided with the plebeians, ruined by the sack and largely indebted to patricians. According to Livy, Capitolinus sold his estate to repay the debt of many of them, and even went over to the plebs, the first patrician to do so. Nevertheless, the growing unrest he had caused led to his trial for seeking kingly power; he was sentenced to death and thrown from the Tarpeian Rock.

Between 376 and 367 BC, the tribunes of the plebs Gaius Licinius Stolo and Lucius Sextius Lateranus continued the plebeian agitation and pushed for an ambitious legislation, known as the leges Liciniae Sextiae. The most important bill opened the consulship to plebeians. Other tribunes controlled by the patricians vetoed the bills, but Stolo and Lateranus retaliated by vetoing the elections for five years while being continuously reelected by the plebs, resulting in a stalemate. (Note: Livy mentions at least two patricians favourable to the tribunes: Marcus Fabius Ambustus, Stolo's father-in-law, and the dictator for 368 BC Publius Manlius Capitolinus, who appointed the first plebeian magister equitum, Gaius Licinius Calvus.) In 367 BC, they carried a bill creating the decemviri sacris faciundis, a college of ten priests, of whom five had to be plebeians, thereby breaking patricians' monopoly on priesthoods. The resolution of the crisis came from the dictator Camillus, who made a compromise with the tribunes: he agreed to their bills, and they in return consented to the creation of the offices of praetor and curule aediles, both reserved to patricians. Lateranus became the first plebeian consul in 366 BC; Stolo followed in 361 BC.

Soon after, plebeians were able to hold both the dictatorship and the censorship. The four-time consul Gaius Marcius Rutilus became the first plebeian dictator in 356 BC and censor in 351 BC. In 342 BC, the tribune of the plebs Lucius Genucius passed his leges Genuciae, which abolished interest on loans, in a renewed effort to tackle indebtedness; required the election of at least one plebeian consul each year; and prohibited magistrates from holding the same magistracy for the next ten years or two magistracies in the same year. In 339 BC, the plebeian consul and dictator Quintus Publilius Philo passed three laws extending the plebeians' powers. His first law followed the lex Genucia by reserving one censorship to plebeians, the second made plebiscites binding on all citizens (including patricians), and the third required the Senate to give its prior approval to plebiscites before they became binding on all citizens.

During the early Republic, consuls chose senators from among their supporters. Shortly before 312 BC, the lex Ovinia transferred this power to the censors, who could only remove senators for misconduct, thus appointing them for life. This law strongly increased the power of the Senate, which was by now protected from the influence of the consuls and became the central organ of government. (Note: Appius Caecus is a complex character whose reforms are difficult to interpret. For example, Mommsen considered he was a revolutionary, but was puzzled by his opposition to the lex Ogulnia, which contradicts his previous "democratic" policies. Taylor on the contrary thought he defended patricians' interests, as freedmen remained in the clientele of their patrons. More recently, Humm described his activity as the continuation of the reforms undertaken since Stolo and Lateranus.) In 312 BC, following this law, the patrician censor Appius Claudius Caecus appointed many more senators to fill the new limit of 300, including descendants of freedmen, which was deemed scandalous. Caecus also launched a vast construction programmee, building the first aqueduct, the aqua Appia, and the first Roman road, the via Appia.

In 300 BC, the two tribunes of the plebs Gnaeus and Quintus Ogulnius passed the lex Ogulnia, which created four plebeian pontiffs, equalling the number of patrician pontiffs, and five plebeian augurs, outnumbering the four patricians in the college. The Conflict of the Orders ended with the last secession of the plebs around 287. The dictator Quintus Hortensius passed the lex Hortensia, which reenacted the law of 339 BC, making plebiscites binding on all citizens, while also removing the requirement for prior Senate approval. These events were a political victory of the wealthy plebeian elite, who exploited the economic difficulties of the plebs for their own gain: Stolo, Lateranus, and Genucius bound their bills attacking patricians' political supremacy with debt-relief measures. As a result of the end of the patrician monopoly on senior magistracies, many small patrician gentes faded into history during the 4th and 3rd centuries BC due to the lack of available positions. About a dozen remaining patrician gentes and twenty plebeian ones thus formed a new elite, called the nobiles.

==== Pyrrhic War ====
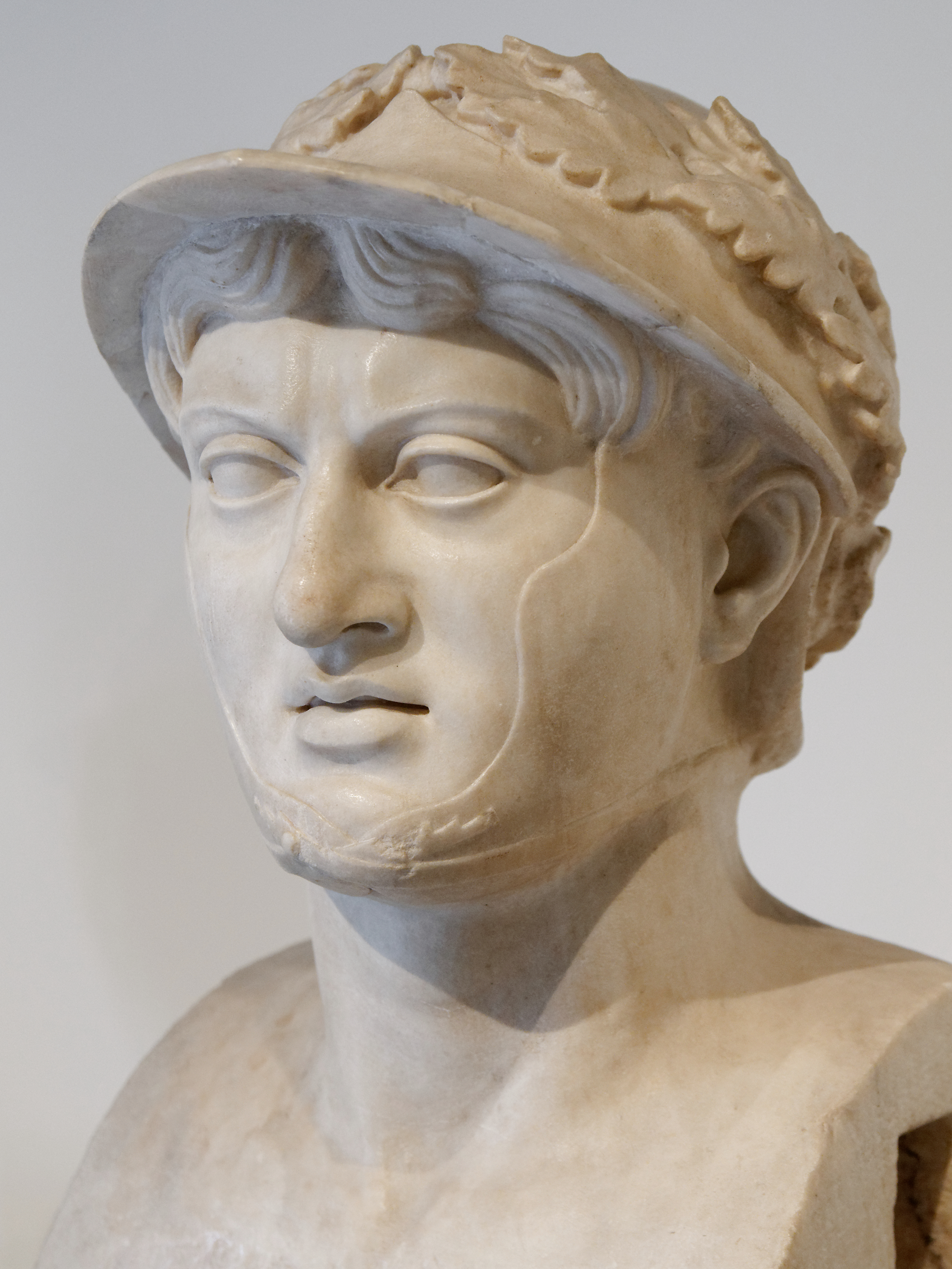
Bust of Pyrrhus, found in the Villa of the Papyri at Herculaneum, now in the Naples Archaeological Museum

By the early 3rd century BC, Rome had established itself as the major power in Italy, but had not yet come into conflict with the dominant military powers of the Mediterranean: Carthage and the Greek kingdoms. In 282, several Roman warships entered the harbour of Tarentum, triggering a violent reaction from the Tarentine democrats, who sank some. The Roman embassy sent to investigate the affair was insulted and war was promptly declared. Facing a hopeless situation, the Tarentines (together with the Lucanians and Samnites) appealed to Pyrrhus, king of Epirus, for military aid. A cousin of Alexander the Great, he was eager to build an empire for himself in the western Mediterranean and saw Tarentum's plea as a perfect opportunity.

Pyrrhus and his army of 25,500 men (with 20 war elephants) landed in the Italian peninsula in 280 BC. The Romans were defeated at Heraclea, as their cavalry were afraid of Pyrrhus's elephants. Pyrrhus then marched on Rome, but the Romans concluded a peace in the north and moved south with reinforcements, placing Pyrrhus in danger of being flanked by two consular armies; Pyrrhus withdrew to Tarentum. In 279 BC, Pyrrhus met the consuls Publius Decius Mus and Publius Sulpicius Saverrio at the Battle of Asculum, which remained undecided for two days. Finally, Pyrrhus personally charged into the melee and won his since-eponymous Pyrrhic victory, at the cost of an important part of his troops. He allegedly said, "if we are victorious in one more battle with the Romans, we shall be utterly ruined." (Note: There are significant differences between the accounts of Cassius Dio, Dionysius, and Plutarch, but the latter's is traditionally followed in the academic literature.)

He escaped the Italian deadlock by answering a call for help from Syracuse, where tyrant Thoenon was desperately fighting an invasion from Carthage. Pyrrhus could not let them take the whole island, as it would have compromised his ambitions in the western Mediterranean, and so declared war. The Carthaginians lifted the siege of Syracuse before his arrival, but he could not entirely oust them from the island as he failed to take their fortress of Lilybaeum. His harsh rule soon led to widespread antipathy among the Sicilians; some cities even defected to Carthage. In 275 BC, Pyrrhus left the island before he had to face a full-scale rebellion. He returned to Italy, where his Samnite allies were on the verge of losing the war. Pyrrhus again met the Romans at the Battle of Beneventum. This time, the consul Manius Dentatus was victorious and even captured eight elephants. Pyrrhus then withdrew from Italy, but left a garrison in Tarentum, to wage a new campaign in Greece against Antigonus II Gonatas of Macedonia. His death in battle at Argos in 272 BC forced Tarentum to surrender to Rome.

=== Punic Wars and expansion in the Mediterranean ===
==== First Punic War (264–241 BC) ====
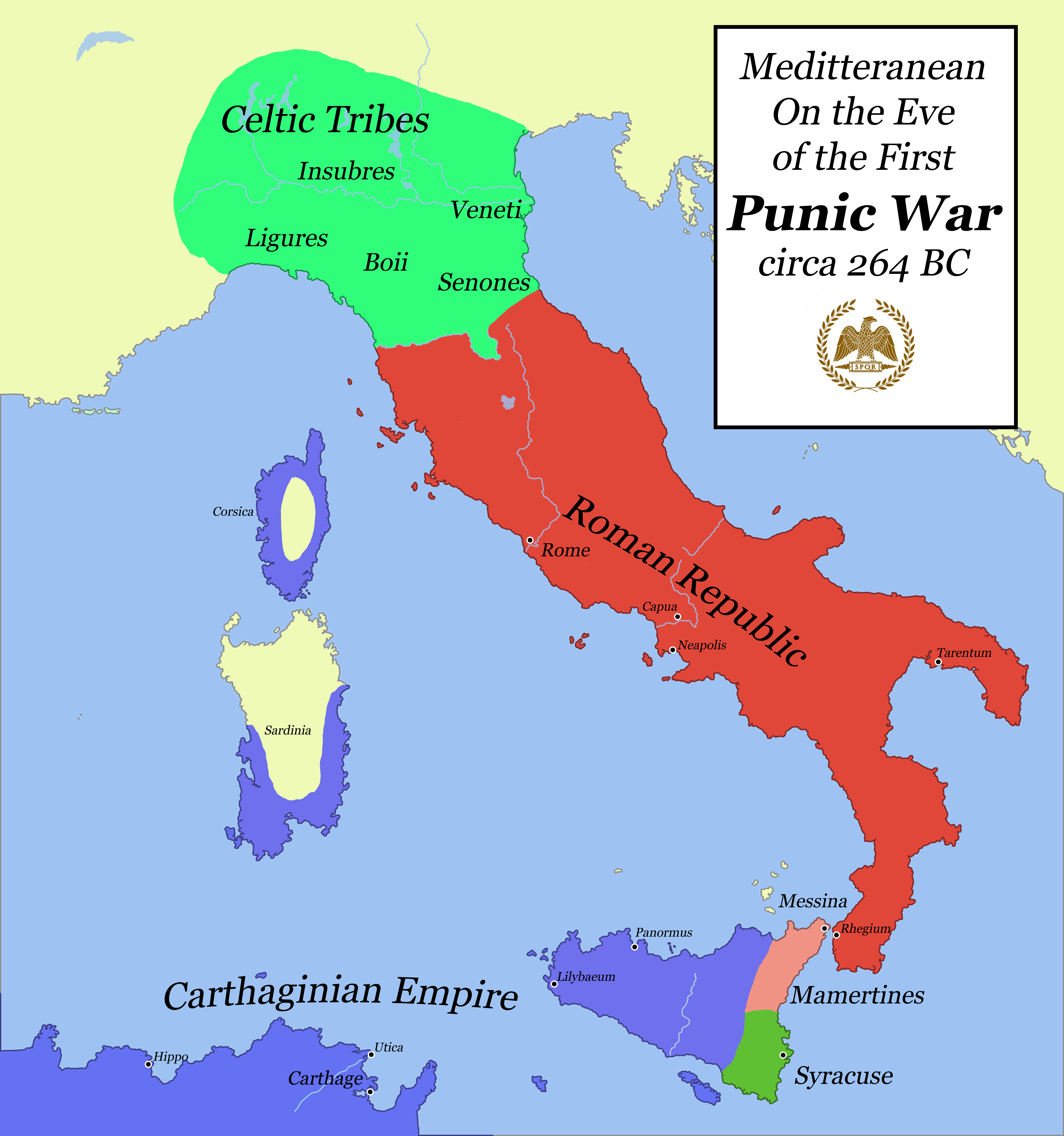
The Roman Republic before the First Punic War

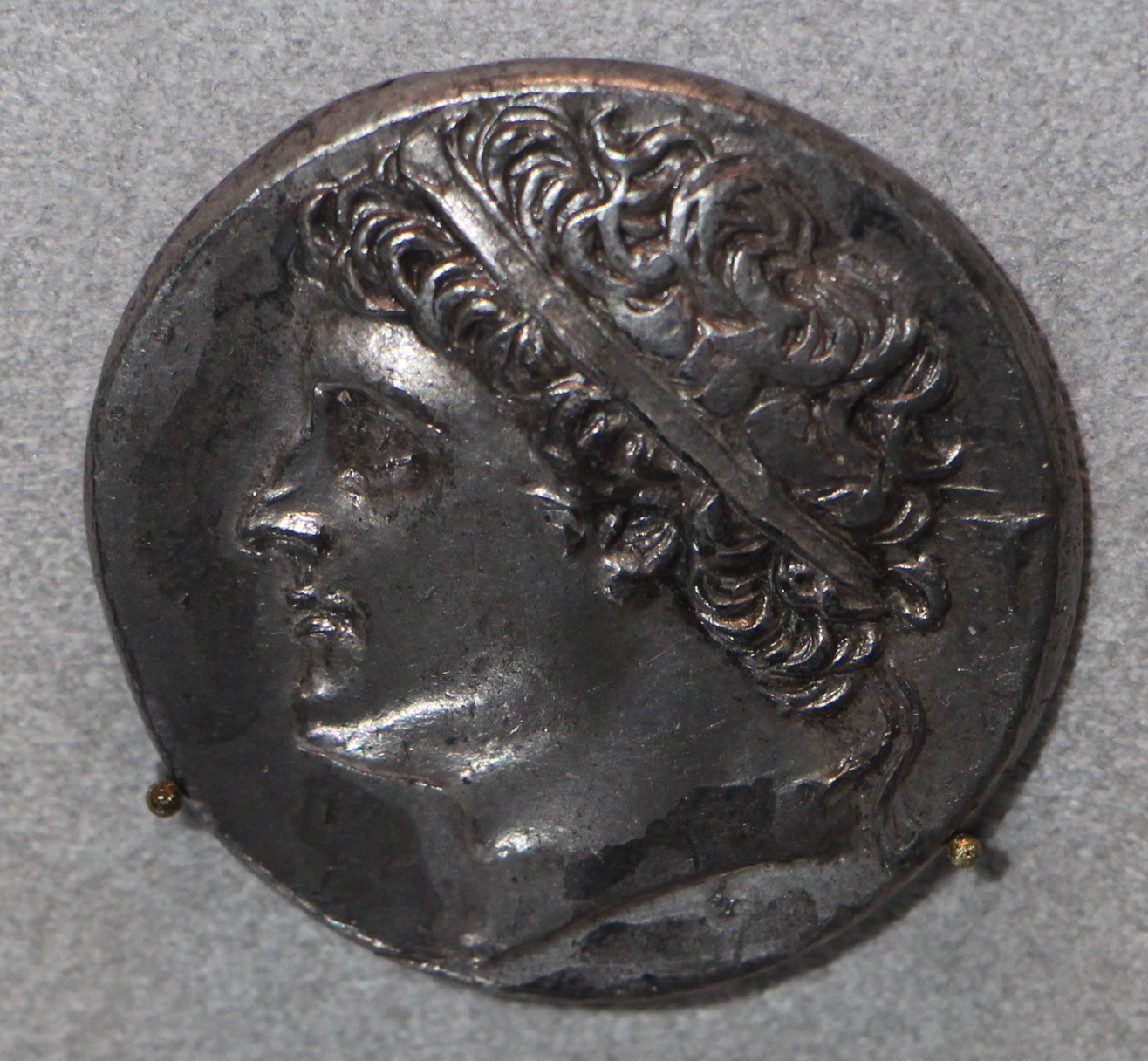
Coin of Hiero II of Syracuse

Rome and Carthage were initially on friendly terms, lastly in an alliance against Pyrrhus, but tensions rapidly rose after the departure of the Epirote king. Between 288 and 283 BC, Messina in Sicily was taken by the Mamertines, a band of mercenaries formerly employed by Agathocles. They plundered the surroundings until Hiero II, the new tyrant of Syracuse, defeated them (in either 269 or 265 BC). In effect under a Carthaginian protectorate, the remaining Mamertines appealed to Rome to regain their independence. Senators were divided on whether to help. A supporter of war, the consul Appius Claudius Caudex, turned to one of the popular assemblies to get a favourable vote by promising plunder to the voters. (Note: The specific assembly consulted has led to many discussions in the academic literature. Goldsworthy 2001, p. 69 favours the Centuriate Assembly. Scullard 1989b, p. 542 similarly prefers the centuria over the tribes. It is unclear whether the Romans formally declared war; they may have justified the conflict in terms of fulfilling the newly-ratified Mamertine alliance.) After the assembly ratified an alliance with the Mamertines, Caudex was dispatched to cross the strait and lend aid.

Diagram of a corvus

Messina fell under Roman control quickly. Syracuse and Carthage, at war for centuries, responded with an alliance to counter the invasion and blockaded Messina, but Caudex defeated Hiero and Carthage separately. His successor, Manius Valerius Maximus, landed with an army of 40,000 men and conquered eastern Sicily, which prompted Hiero to shift his allegiance and forge a long-lasting alliance with Rome. In 262 BC, the Romans moved to the southern coast and besieged Akragas. In order to raise the siege, Carthage sent reinforcements, including 60 elephants—the first time they used them—but still lost the battle. Nevertheless, Rome could not take all of Sicily because Carthage's naval superiority prevented it from effectively besieging coastal cities. Using a captured Carthaginian ship as blueprint, Rome therefore launched a massive construction programme and built 100 quinqueremes in only two months. It also invented a new device, the corvus, a grappling engine that enabled a crew to board an enemy ship. The consul for 260 BC, Gnaeus Cornelius Scipio Asina, lost the first naval skirmish of the war against Hannibal Gisco at Lipara, but his colleague Gaius Duilius won a great victory at Mylae. He destroyed or captured 44 ships and was the first Roman to receive a naval triumph, which also included captive Carthaginians for the first time. Although Carthage was victorious on land at Thermae in Sicily, the corvus gave a strong advantage to Rome on the waters. The consul Lucius Cornelius Scipio (Asina's brother) captured Corsica in 259 BC; his successors won the naval battles of Sulci in 258, Tyndaris in 257 BC, and Cape Ecnomus in 256.

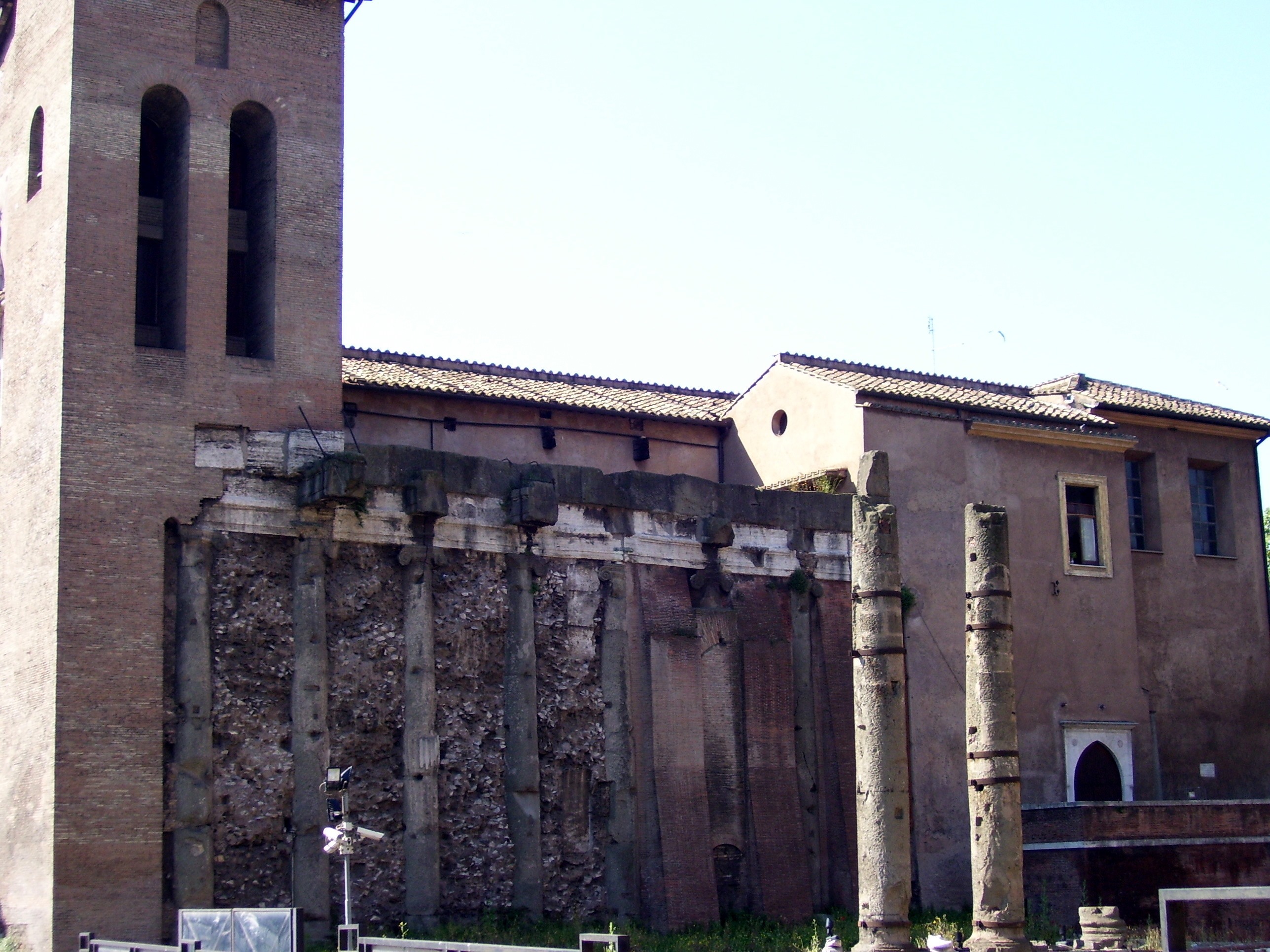
Temple of Janus as seen in the present church of San Nicola in Carcere, in the Forum Holitorium of Rome, Italy, dedicated by Gaius Duilius after his naval victory at the Battle of Mylae in 260 BC

To hasten the end of the war, the consuls for 256 BC decided to carry the operations to Africa, on Carthage's homeland. The consul Marcus Atilius Regulus landed on the Cap Bon peninsula with about 18,000 soldiers. He captured the city of Aspis, repulsed Carthage's counterattack at Adys, and took Tunis. The Carthaginians hired Spartan mercenaries, led by Xanthippus, to command their troops. In 255, the Spartan general marched on Regulus, crushing the Roman infantry on the Bagradas plain; only 2,000 soldiers escaped, and Regulus was captured. The consuls for 255 nonetheless won a naval victory at Cape Hermaeum, where they captured 114 warships. This success was spoilt by a storm that annihilated the victorious navy: 184 ships of 264 sank, 25,000 soldiers and 75,000 rowers drowned. The corvus considerably hindered ships' navigation and made them vulnerable during tempest. It was abandoned after another similar catastrophe in 253 BC. These disasters prevented any significant campaign between 254 and 252 BC.

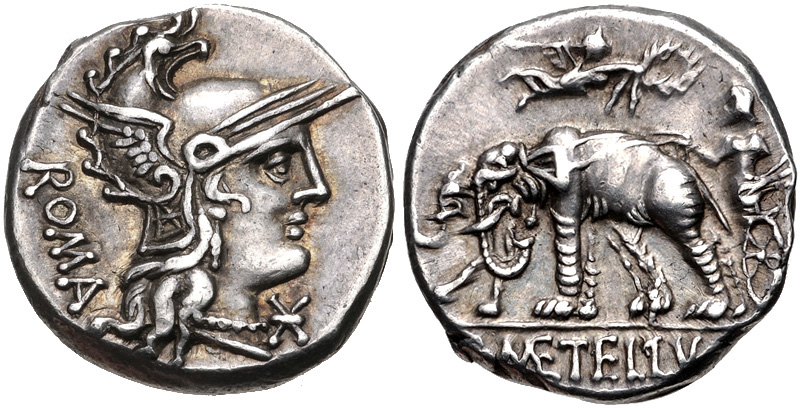
Denarius of Gaius Caecilius Metellus Caprarius, 125 BC. The reverse depicts the triumph of his great-grandfather Lucius, with the elephants he had captured at Panormos. The elephant had thence become the emblem of the powerful Caecilii Metelli.

Hostilities in Sicily resumed in 252 BC, with Rome's taking of Thermae. The next year, Carthage besieged Lucius Caecilius Metellus, who held Panormos (now Palermo). The consul had dug trenches to counter the elephants, which once hurt by missiles turned back on their own army, resulting in a great victory for Metellus. Rome then besieged the last Carthaginian strongholds in Sicily, Lilybaeum and Drepana, but these cities were impregnable by land. Publius Claudius Pulcher, the consul of 249, recklessly tried to take the latter from the sea, but suffered a terrible defeat; his colleague Lucius Junius Pullus likewise lost his fleet off Lilybaeum. Without the corvus, Roman warships had lost their advantage. By now, both sides were drained and could not undertake large-scale operations. The only military activity during this period was the landing in Sicily of Hamilcar Barca in 247 BC, who harassed the Romans with a mercenary army from a citadel he built on Mt. Eryx.

Unable to take the Punic fortresses in Sicily, Rome tried to decide the war at sea and built a new navy, thanks to a forced borrowing from the rich. In 242 BC, 200 quinqueremes under consul Gaius Lutatius Catulus blockaded Drepana. The rescue fleet from Carthage was soundly defeated by Catulus. Exhausted and unable to bring supplies to Sicily, Carthage sued for peace. Carthage had to pay 1,000 talents immediately and 2,200 over ten years and evacuate Sicily. The fine was so high that Carthage could not pay Hamilcar's mercenaries, who had been shipped back to Africa. They revolted during the Mercenary War, which Carthage suppressed with enormous difficulty. Meanwhile, Rome took advantage of a similar revolt in Sardinia to seize the island from Carthage, in violation of the peace treaty. This led to permanent bitterness in Carthage.

==== Second Punic War ====
Principal offensives of the war: Rome (red), Hannibal (green), Hasdrubal (purple)

After its victory, the Republic shifted its attention to its northern border as the Insubres and Boii were threatening Italy. Meanwhile, Carthage compensated the loss of Sicily and Sardinia with the conquest of Southern Hispania (up to Salamanca), and its rich silver mines. This rapid expansion worried Rome, which concluded a treaty with Hasdrubal in 226, stating that Carthage could not cross the Ebro river. But the city of Saguntum, south of the Ebro, appealed to Rome in 220 to act as arbitrator during a period of internal strife. Hannibal took the city in 219, triggering the Second Punic War.

Initially, the Republic's plan was to carry war outside Italy, sending the consuls P. Cornelius Scipio to Hispania and Ti. Sempronius Longus to Africa, while their naval superiority prevented Carthage from attacking from the sea. This plan was thwarted by Hannibal's bold move to Italy. In May 218, he crossed the Ebro with a large army of about 100,000 soldiers and 37 elephants. He passed in Gaul, crossed the Rhone, then the Alps, possibly through the Col de Clapier. This exploit cost him almost half of his troops, but he could now rely on the Boii and Insubres, still at war with Rome. Publius Scipio, who had failed to block Hannibal on the Rhone, sent his elder brother Gnaeus with the main part of his army in Hispania according to the initial plan, and went back to Italy with the rest to resist Hannibal in Italy, but he was defeated and wounded near the Ticino river.

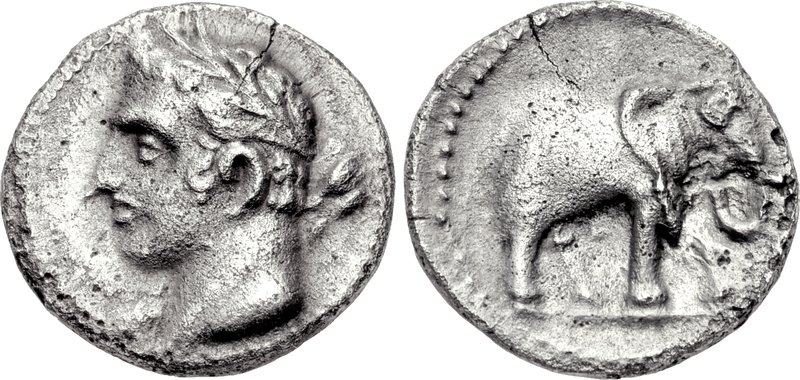
A Carthaginian quarter shekel, perhaps minted in Spain. The obverse may depict Hannibal with the traits of a young Melqart. The reverse features a war elephant, which were included in Hannibal's army during the Second Punic War.

Hannibal then marched south and won three outstanding victories. The first one was on the banks of the Trebia in December 218, where he defeated the other consul Ti. Sempronius Longus. More than half the Roman army was lost. Hannibal then ravaged the country around Arretium to lure the new consul C. Flaminius into a trap at Lake Trasimene. This clever ambush resulted in the death of the consul and the complete destruction of his army of 30,000 men. In 216, the new consuls L. Aemilius Paullus and C. Terentius Varro mustered the biggest army possible, with eight legions—some 80,000 soldiers, twice as many as the Punic army—and confronted Hannibal, who was encamped at Cannae, in Apulia. Despite his numerical disadvantage, Hannibal used his heavier cavalry to rout the Roman wings and envelop their infantry, which he annihilated. In terms of casualties, the Battle of Cannae was the worst defeat in Roman history: only 14,500 soldiers escaped, and Paullus was killed as well as 80 senators. (Note: Polyb., iii.117 reports 70,000 dead. Livy, xxii.49 reports 47,700 dead and 19,300 prisoners.) Soon after, the Boii ambushed the army of the consul-elect for 215, L. Postumius Albinus, who died with all his army of 25,000 men in the Battle of Silva Litana.

These disasters triggered a wave of defection among Roman allies, with the rebellions of the Samnites, Oscans, Lucanians, and Greek cities of Southern Italy. In Macedonia, Philip V also made an alliance with Hannibal in order to take Illyria and the area around Epidamnus, occupied by Rome. His attack on Apollonia started the First Macedonian War. In 215, Hiero II of Syracuse died of old age, and his young grandson Hieronymus broke the long alliance with Rome to side with Carthage. At this desperate point, the aggressive strategy against Hannibal the Scipiones advocated was abandoned in favour of a slow reconquest of the lost territories, since Hannibal could not be everywhere to defend them. Although he remained invincible on the battlefield, defeating all the Roman armies on his way, he could not prevent Claudius Marcellus from taking Syracuse in 212 after a long siege, nor the fall of his bases of Capua and Tarentum in 211 and 209.

In Hispania, Publius and Gnaeus Scipio won the battles of Cissa in 218, soon after Hannibal's departure, and Dertosa against his brother Hasdrubal in 215, which enabled them to conquer the eastern coast of Hispania. But in 211, Hasdrubal and Mago Barca successfully turned the Celtiberian tribes that supported the Scipiones, and attacked them simultaneously at the Battle of the Upper Baetis, in which the Scipiones died. Publius's son, the future Scipio Africanus, was then elected with a special proconsulship to lead the Hispanic campaign, winning a series of battles with ingenious tactics. In 209, he took Carthago Nova, the main Punic base in Hispania. The next year, he defeated Hasdrubal at the Battle of Baecula. After his defeat, Carthage ordered Hasdrubal to reinforce his brother in Italy. Since he could not use ships, he followed the same route as his brother through the Alps, but the consuls M. Livius Salinator and C. Claudius Nero were awaiting him and defeated him in the Battle of the Metaurus, where Hasdrubal died. It was the turning point of the war. The campaign of attrition had worked well: Hannibal's troops were now depleted; he only had one elephant left (Surus) and retreated to Bruttium, on the defensive. In Greece, Rome contained Philip V without devoting too many forces by allying with the Aetolian League, Sparta, and Pergamon, which also prevented Philip from aiding Hannibal. The war with Macedon resulted in a stalemate, with the Treaty of Phoenice signed in 205.

In Hispania, Scipio continued his successful campaign at the battles of Carmona in 207, and Ilipa (now Seville) in 206, which ended the Punic threat on the peninsula. Elected consul in 205, he convinced the Senate to invade Africa with the support of the Numidian king Masinissa, who had defected to Rome. Scipio landed in Africa in 204. He took Utica and then won the Battle of the Great Plains, which prompted Carthage to open peace negotiations. The talks failed because Scipio wanted to impose harsher terms on Carthage to prevent it from rising again as a threat. Hannibal was therefore sent to face Scipio at Zama. Scipio could now use the light Numidian cavalry of Massinissa—which had hitherto been so successful against Rome—to rout the Punic wings, then flank the infantry, as Hannibal had done at Cannae. Defeated for the first time, Hannibal convinced the Carthaginian Senate to pay the war indemnity, which was even harsher than that of 241: 10,000 talents in 50 instalments. Carthage also had to give up all its elephants, all its fleet but ten triremes, and all its possessions outside its core territory in Africa (what is now Tunisia), and it could not declare war without Roman authorisation. In effect, Carthage was condemned to be a minor power, while Rome recovered from a desperate situation to dominate the western Mediterranean.

==== Roman supremacy in the Greek East ====
Macedonian Wars

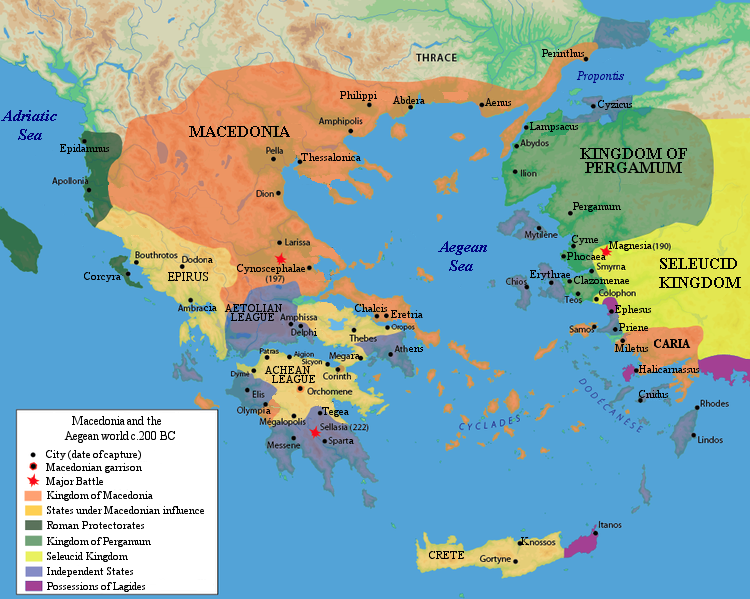
Macedonia, Greece and Asia at the outbreak of the Second Macedonian War, 200 BC

Rome's preoccupation with its war with Carthage provided an opportunity for Philip V of Macedonia, in the north of the Greek peninsula, to attempt to extend his power westward. He sent ambassadors to Hannibal's camp in Italy, to negotiate an alliance as common enemies of Rome. But Rome discovered the agreement when Philip's emissaries were captured by a Roman fleet. The First Macedonian War saw the Romans involved directly in only limited land operations, but they achieved their objective of occupying Philip and preventing him from aiding Hannibal.

The past century had seen the Greek world dominated by the three primary successor kingdoms of Alexander the Great's empire: Ptolemaic Egypt, Macedonia and the Seleucid Empire. In 202, internal problems led to a weakening of Egypt's position, disrupting the power balance among the successor states. Macedonia and the Seleucid Empire agreed to an alliance to conquer and divide Egypt. Fearing this increasingly unstable situation, several small Greek kingdoms sent delegations to Rome to seek an alliance. Rome gave Philip an ultimatum to cease his campaigns against Rome's new Greek allies. Doubting Rome's strength, Philip ignored the request, and Rome sent an army of Romans and Greek allies, beginning the Second Macedonian War. In 197, the Romans decisively defeated Philip at the Battle of Cynoscephalae, and Philip was forced to give up his recent Greek conquests. The Romans declared the "Peace of the Greeks", believing that Philip's defeat now meant that Greece would be stable, and pulled out of Greece entirely.

With Egypt and Macedonia weakened, the Seleucid Empire made increasingly aggressive and successful attempts to conquer the entire Greek world. Now not only Rome's allies against Philip, but even Philip himself, sought a Roman alliance against the Seleucids. The situation was exacerbated by the fact that Hannibal was now a chief military advisor to the Seleucid emperor, and the two were believed to be planning outright conquest not just of Greece, but also of Rome. The Seleucids were much stronger than the Macedonians had ever been, because they controlled much of the former Persian Empire and had almost entirely reassembled Alexander the Great's former empire.

Fearing the worst, the Romans began a major mobilisation, all but pulling out of recently conquered Spain and Gaul. This fear was shared by Rome's Greek allies, who now followed Rome again for the first time since that war. A major Roman-Greek force was mobilised under the command of the great hero of the Second Punic War, Scipio Africanus, and set out for Greece, beginning the Roman–Seleucid War. After initial fighting that revealed serious Seleucid weaknesses, the Seleucids tried to turn the Roman strength against them at the Battle of Thermopylae, but were forced to evacuate Greece. The Romans pursued the Seleucids by crossing the Hellespont, the first time a Roman army had ever entered Asia. The decisive engagement was fought at the Battle of Magnesia, resulting in complete Roman victory. The Seleucids sued for peace, and Rome forced them to give up their recent Greek conquests. Rome again withdrew from Greece, assuming (or hoping) that the lack of a major Greek power would ensure a stable peace. In fact, it did the opposite.

==== Conquest of Greece ====
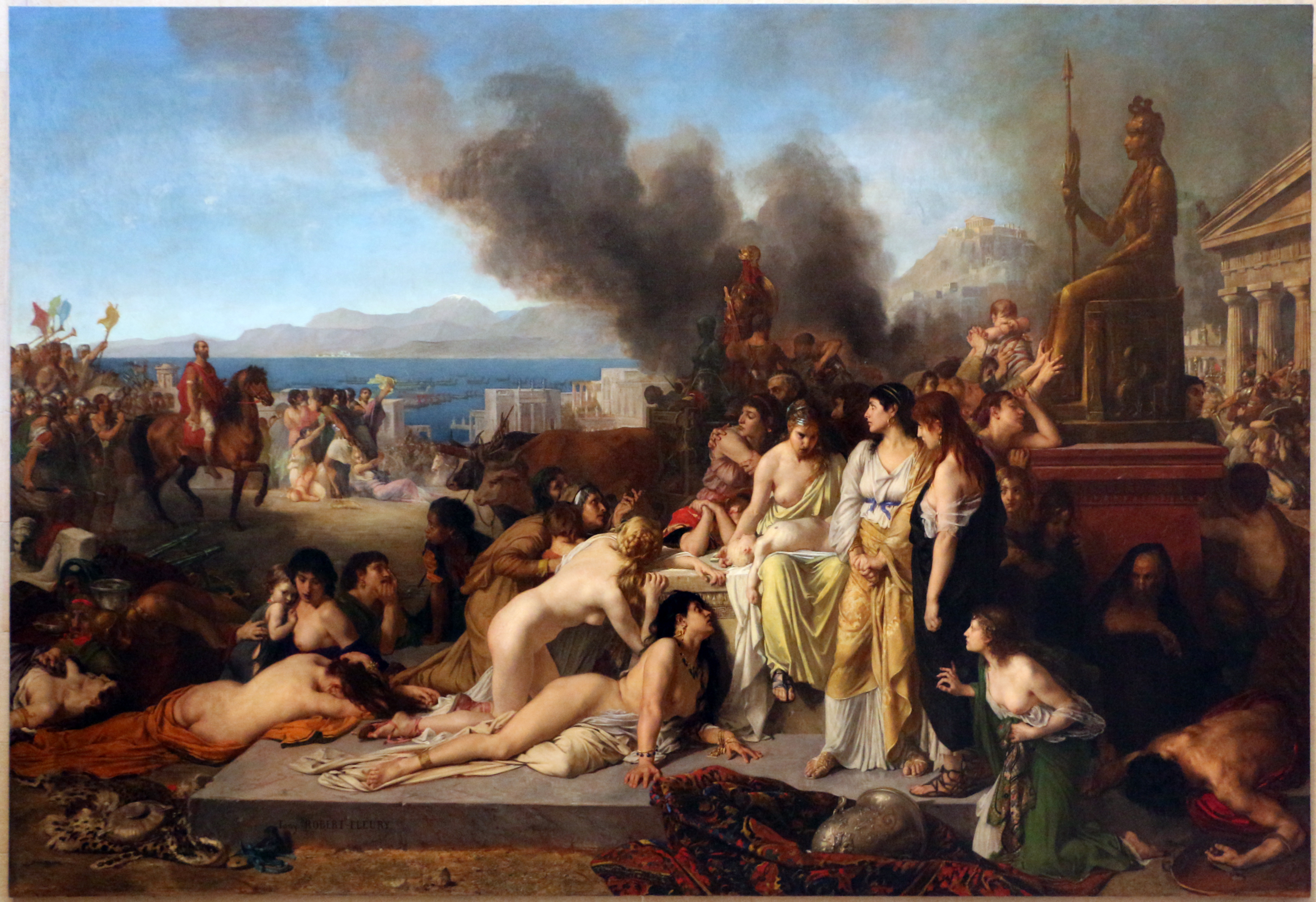
Scene of the Battle of Corinth (146 BC): last day before the Roman legions looted and burned the Greek city of Corinth. The last day on Corinth, Tony Robert-Fleury, 1870.

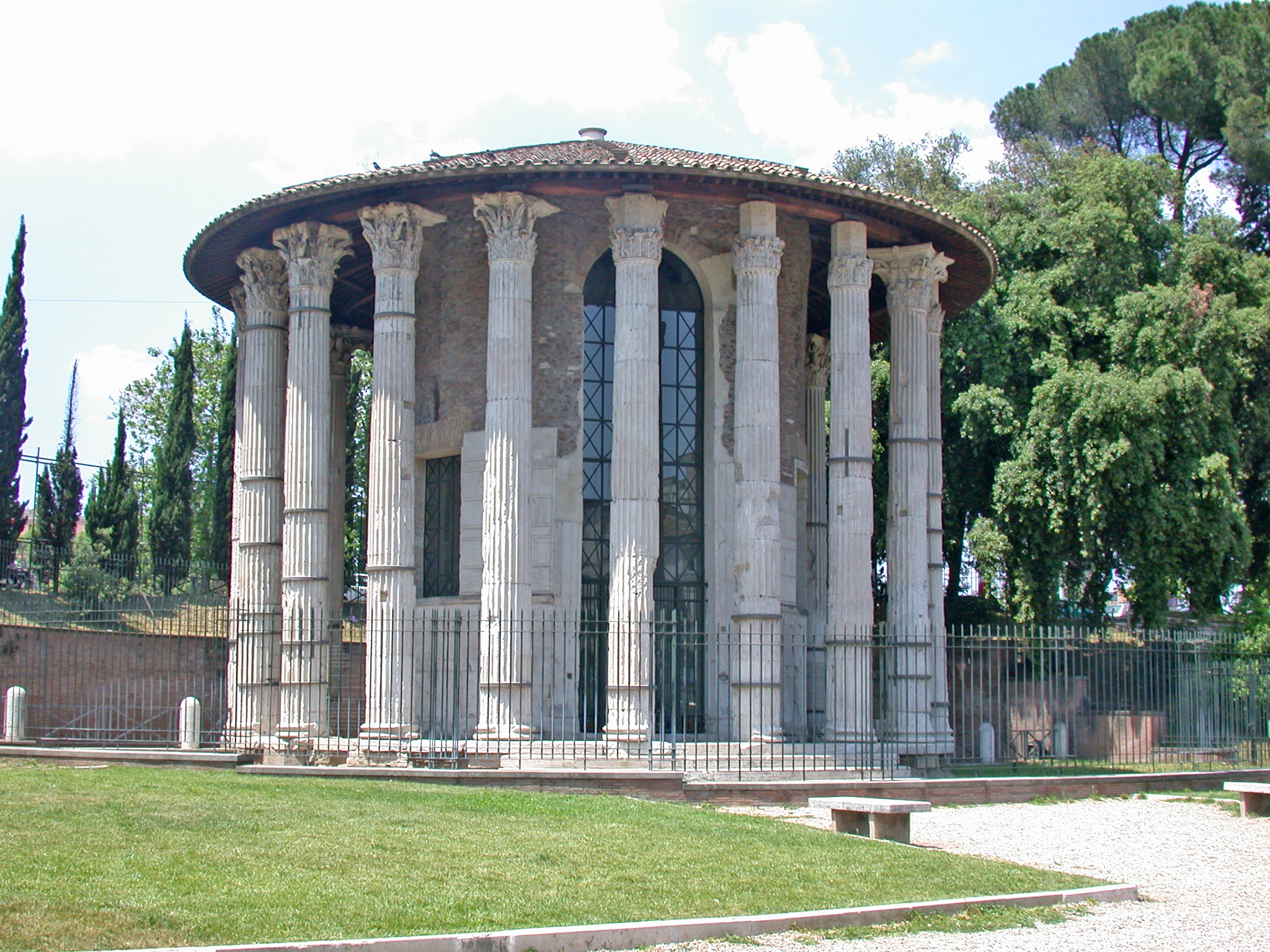
The Temple of Hercules Victor, Rome, built in the mid-2nd century BC, most likely by Lucius Mummius Achaicus, victor of the Achaean War

In 179, Philip died. His talented and ambitious son, Perseus, took the throne and showed a renewed interest in conquering Greece. With its Greek allies facing a major new threat, Rome declared war on Macedonia again, starting the Third Macedonian War. Perseus initially had some success against the Romans, but Rome responded by sending a stronger army which decisively defeated the Macedonians at the Battle of Pydna in 168. The Macedonians capitulated, ending the war.

Convinced now that the Greeks (and therefore the rest of the region) would not have peace if left alone, Rome decided to establish its first permanent foothold in the Greek world, and divided Macedonia into four client republics. Yet Macedonian agitation continued. The Fourth Macedonian War, 150 to 148 BC, was fought against a Macedonian pretender to the throne who was again destabilising Greece by trying to reestablish the old kingdom. The Romans swiftly defeated the Macedonians at the second battle of Pydna.

The Achaean League, seeing the direction of Roman policy trending towards direct administration, met at Corinth and declared war "nominally against Sparta but in reality, against Rome". It was swiftly defeated: in 146, the same year as the destruction of Carthage, Corinth was besieged and destroyed, forcing the league's surrender. Rome decided to divide the Greek territories into two new, directly administered Roman provinces, Achaea and Macedonia.

==== Third Punic War ====
For Carthage, the Third Punic War was a simple punitive mission after the neighbouring Numidians allied to Rome robbed and attacked Carthaginian merchants. Treaties had forbidden any war with Roman allies; viewing defence against banditry as "war action", Rome decided to annihilate Carthage. Carthage was almost defenceless, and submitted when besieged. But the Romans demanded complete surrender and removal of the city into the desert hinterland, far from any coastal or harbour region; the Carthaginians refused. The city was besieged and completely destroyed. Rome acquired all of Carthage's North African and Iberian territories. The Romans rebuilt Carthage 100 years later as a Roman colony, by order of Julius Caesar. It flourished, becoming one of the most important cities in the Roman Empire.

=== Social troubles and first civil war ===
Views on the structural causes of the Republic's collapse differ. One enduring thesis is that Rome's expansion destabilised its social organisation between conflicting interests; the Senate's policymaking, blinded by its own short-term self-interest, alienated large portions of society, who then joined powerful generals who sought to overthrow the system. Two other theses have challenged this view. The first blames the Romans' inability to conceive of plausible alternatives to the traditional republican system in a "crisis without alternative". The second instead stresses the continuity of the republic: until its disruption by Caesar's civil war and the following two decades of civil war created conditions for autocratic rule and made return to republican politics unfeasible: and, per Erich S. Gruen, "civil war caused the fall of the republic, not vice versa".

A core cause of the Republic's eventual demise was the loss of elite's cohesion from c. 133 BC: the ancient sources called this moral decay from wealth and the hubris of Rome's domination of the Mediterranean. Modern sources have proposed multiple reasons why the elite lost cohesion, including wealth inequality and a growing willingness by aristocrats to transgress political norms, especially in the aftermath of the Social War.

==== Gracchan period ====
In the winter of 138–137 BC, a first slave uprising, known as the First Servile War, broke out in Sicily. After initial successes, the slaves led by Eunus and Cleon were defeated by Marcus Perperna and Publius Rupilius in 132 BC.

In this context, Tiberius Gracchus was elected plebeian tribune in 133 BC. He attempted to enact the Lex Sempronia agraria, a law to limit the amount of land anyone could own and establish a commission to distribute public lands to poor rural plebs. The aristocrats, who stood to lose an enormous amount of money, bitterly opposed this proposal. Tiberius submitted this law to the Plebeian Council, but it was vetoed by fellow tribune Marcus Octavius. Tiberius induced the plebs to depose Octavius from his office on the grounds that Octavius acted contrary to the manifest will of the people, a position that was unprecedented and constitutionally dubious. His law was enacted and took effect, (Note: The activities of the Gracchan land commission are archaeologically documented on recovered boundary stones listing the members of the commission. With the find locations, scholars estimate distribution of more than 3,200 square kilometres of public lands, mostly concentrated in southern Italy.) but, when Tiberius ostentatiously stood for reelection to the tribunate, he was murdered by his enemies.

Tiberius's brother Gaius was elected tribune ten years later in 123 and reelected for 122. He induced the plebs to reinforce rights of appeal to the people against capital extrajudicial punishments and institute reforms to improve the people's welfare. While ancient sources tend to "conceive Gracchus' legislation as an elaborate plot against the authority of the Senate... he showed no sign of wanting to replace the Senate in its normal functions". Amid wide-ranging and popular reforms to create grain subsidies, change jury pools, establish and require the Senate to assign provinces before elections, Gaius proposed a law that would grant citizenship rights to Rome's Italian allies. He stood for election to a third term in 121 but was defeated. During violent protests over repeal of an ally's colonisation bill, the Senate moved the first senatus consultum ultimum against him, resulting in his death, with many others, on the Aventine. His legislation (like that of his brother) survived; the Roman aristocracy disliked the Gracchan agitation but accepted their policies.

In 121, the province of Gallia Narbonensis was established after the victory of Quintus Fabius Maximus over a coalition of Arverni and Allobroges in southern Gaul in 123. Lucius Licinius Crassus founded the city of Narbo there in 118.

==== Rise of Marius ====
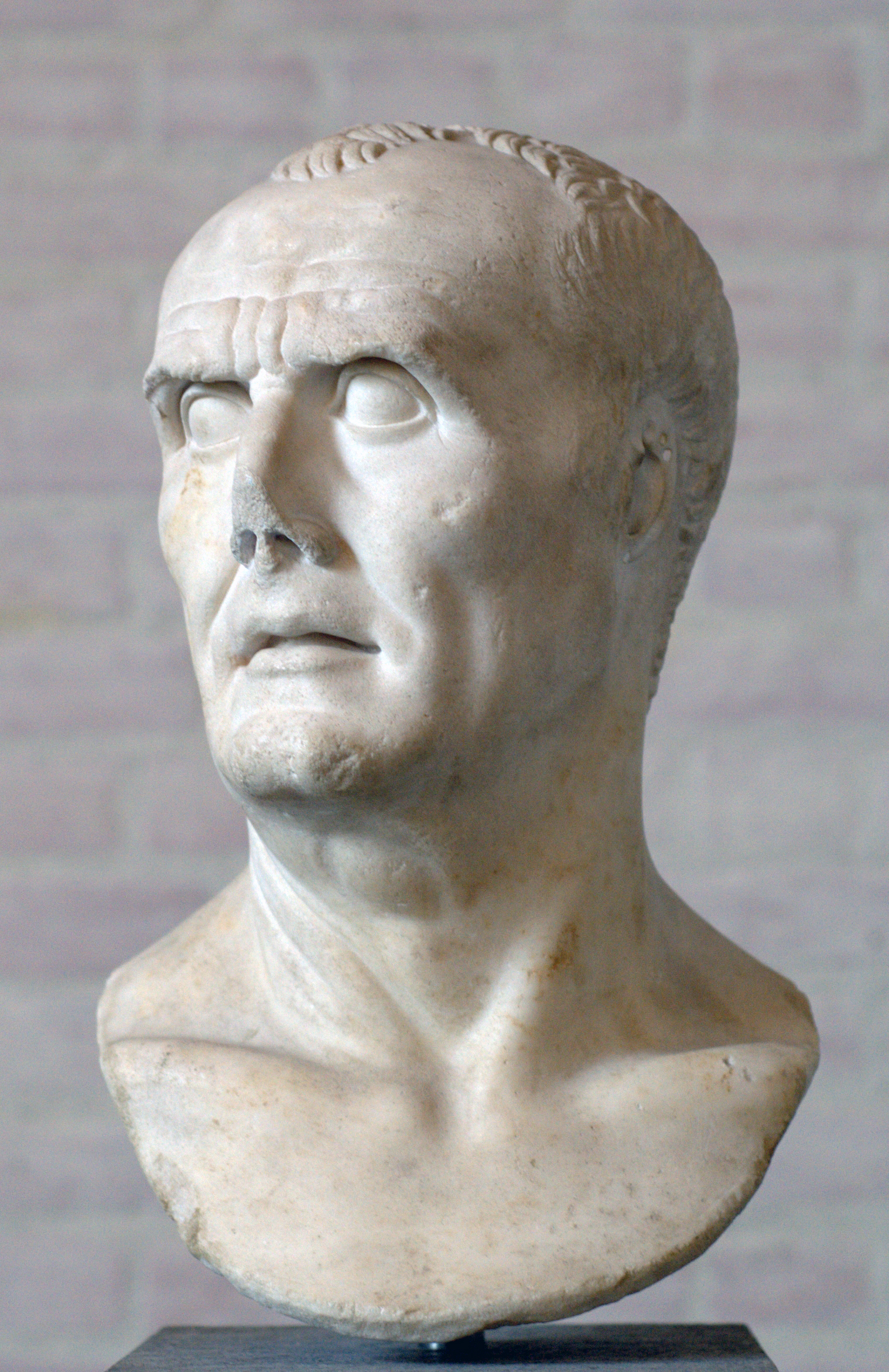
Bust, traditionally identified as Gaius Marius, elected consul seven times

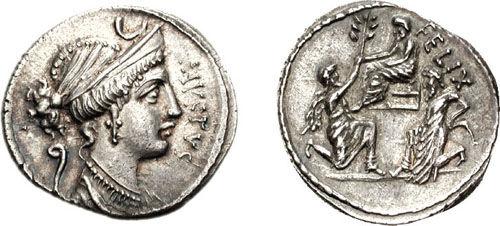
Denarius of Faustus Cornelius Sulla, 56 BC. It shows Diana on the obverse, while the reverse depicts Sulla being offered an olive branch by his ally Bocchus I. Jugurtha is shown captive on the right.

Rome fought the Jugurthine War from 111 to 104 BC against the North African kingdom of Numidia (in what is now Algeria and Tunisia). In 118, its king, Micipsa, died, and an illegitimate son, Jugurtha, usurped the throne. Numidia had been a loyal ally of Rome since the Punic Wars. Initially, Rome mediated a division of the country. But Jugurtha renewed his offensive, leading to a long and inconclusive war with Rome. Gaius Marius was a legate under the consul directing the war and was elected consul in 107 BC over the objections of the aristocratic senators, relying on support from the businessmen and poor. Marius had the Numidian command reassigned to himself through the popular assembly and, with the capture of Jugurtha at the end of a long campaign, ended the war; in the aftermath, the Romans largely withdrew from the province after installing a client king. Marius's victory played on existing themes of senatorial corruption and incompetence, contrasted especially against the military failure of senatorial leadership in the Cimbrian War.

The Cimbrian War (113–101) was a far more serious affair than the earlier Gallic clashes in 121. The Germanic tribes of the Cimbri and the Teutons migrated from northern Europe into Rome's northern territories, and clashed with Rome and its allies. The defeat of various aristocrats in the conflict, along with Marius's reputation for military victory, led to his holding five successive consulships with little to enable him to lead armies against the threat. At the Battle of Aquae Sextiae and the Battle of Vercellae, Marius led the Roman armies, which virtually annihilated both tribes, ending the threat.

During the Cimbrian War, further conflicts embroiled the Republic: A Second Servile War waged in Sicily from 104 to 101; a campaign was waged against pirates in Cilicia; Rome campaigned in Thrace, adding lands to the province of Macedonia; and Lycaonia was annexed to Rome.

==== First civil wars ====
In 91, the Social War broke out between Rome and its former allies in Italy: the main causes of the war were Roman encroachment on allied lands due to the Republic's land redistribution programmes, harsh Roman treatment of the non-citizen allies, and Roman unwillingness to share in the spoils of the empire. After the assassination, in Rome, of a conservative tribune who sought to grant the Italians citizenship, the allies took up arms: most ancient writers explain the conflict in terms of demands for full citizenship, but contemporary rebel propaganda coins indicate it may have been a primarily anti-Roman secessionist movement. The Romans were able to stave off military defeat by conceding the main point almost immediately, tripling the number of citizens. More recent scholarship also has stressed the importance of the war on the allies in destabilising Roman military affairs by blurring the distinction between Romans and foreign enemies.

Further civil conflict emerged, starting in 88. One of the consuls that year, L. Cornelius Sulla, was assigned to take an army against the Pontic king Mithridates. The local governor there was defeated, but C. Marius induced a tribune to promulgate legislation reassigning Sulla's command to Marius. Sulla responded by suborning his army, marching on Rome (the city was undefended but politically outraged), and declaring Marius and 11 of his allies outlaws before departing east to war with Mithridates. Marius, who had escaped into exile, returned, and with L. Cornelius Cinna, took control of the city.

After the Marians took control of the city, they started to purge their political enemies. They elected, in irregular fashion, Marius and Cinna to the consulship of 86 BC. Marius died a fortnight after assuming office. Cinna took control of the state: his policies are unclear and the record is muddled by Sulla's eventual victory. The Cinnan regime declared Sulla a public enemy and ostensibly replaced him in command in the east. Instead of cooperating with his replacement, which Sulla viewed as illegitimate, he made peace with Mithridates and prepared to return to Italy. By 85 BC, the Cinnans in Rome started preparations to defend the peninsula from invasion.

In 83, he returned from the east with a small but experienced army. Initial reactions were negative across the peninsula, but after winning a number of victories he was able to overcome resistance and capture the city. In the Battle of the Colline Gate, just outside Rome, Sulla's army defeated the Marian defenders and then proceeded to "run riot... killing for profit, pleasure, or personal vengeance anyone they pleased". He then instituted procedures to centralise the killing, creating lists of proscribed persons who could be killed for their property without punishment. After establishing political control, Sulla had himself made dictator in November 82 BC and passed a series of constitutional reforms intended to strengthen the position of the magistrates and the senate in the state and replace custom with new rigid statute laws enforced by new permanent courts. Sulla resigned the dictatorship in 81 after election as consul for 80. He then retired, and died in 78 BC.

==== Sullan republic ====
Cn. Pompey Magnus served the Sullan regime during a short conflict triggered by the republic's own consul, M. Aemilius Lepidus, in 77 BC and afterwards led troops successfully against the remaining anti-Sullan forces in the Sertorian War; he brought the war successfully to a close in 72 BC. While Pompey was in Spain, the Republic faced agitation both foreign and domestic. The main domestic political struggle was the restoration of tribunician powers stripped during Sulla's dictatorship. After rumours of a pact between Q. Sertorius's ostensible republic-in-exile, Mithridates, and various Mediterranean pirate groups, the Sullan regime feared encirclement and stepped up efforts against the threats: they reinforced Pompey in Spain and fortified Bithynia. In spring 73 BC, Mithridates did so, invading Bithynia.

In 73, a slave uprising started in southern Italy under Spartacus, a gladiator, who defeated the local Roman garrisons and four legions under the consuls of 72. At the head of some 70,000 men, Spartacus led them in a Third Servile War—they sought freedom by escape from Italy—before being defeated by troops raised by M. Licinius Crassus. Although Pompey and Crassus were rivals, they were elected to a joint consulship in 70. During their consulship, they brought—with little opposition—legislation to dismantle the tribunician disabilities imposed by Sulla's constitutional reforms. They also shepherded legislation to settle the contentious matter of jury reform.

L. Licinius Lucullus, one of Sulla's ablest lieutenants, had fought against Mithridates during the first Mithridatic war before Sulla's civil war. Mithridates also had fought Rome in a second Mithridatic war (83–82 BC). Rome for its part seemed equally eager for war and the spoils and prestige that it might bring. After his invasion of Bithynia in 73, Lucullus was assigned against Mithridates and his Armenian ally Tigranes the Great in Asia Minor. Fighting a war of manoeuvre against Mithridates' supply lines, Lucullus was able force Mithridates from an attempted siege of Cyzicus and pursue him into Pontus and thence into Armenia. After defeat forced the Romans from large parts of Armenia and Pontus in 67, Lucullus was replaced in command by Pompey. Pompey moved against Mithridates in 66. Defeating him in battle and securing the submission of Tigranes, Mithridates fled to Crimea, where he was betrayed and killed by his son Pharnaces in 63. Pompey remained in the East to pacify and settle Roman conquests in the region, also extending Roman control south to Judaea.

=== End of the Republic ===
==== First Triumvirate ====
Pompey returned from the Third Mithridatic War at the end of 62 BC. In the interim, before his return to Italy, the senate had successfully suppressed a conspiracy and insurrection led by a senator, Lucius Sergius Catilina, to overthrow that year's consuls. In the aftermath of the conspiracy, which was abetted by popular discontent, the Senate moved legislation to temper unrest in Italy: expanding the grain dole and implementing other reforms. Pompey, landing in Brundisium, publicly dismissed his troops, indicating that he had no desire to follow Sulla's example and dominate the republic by force, as some conservative senators had feared. He attempted to have his eastern settlements passed by the Senate; ratification was not forthcoming, due to the opposition of Lucullus, Crassus, and Cato the Younger.

After Julius Caesar's election as one of the consuls of 59 BC, Pompey, Caesar, and Crassus engaged in a political alliance (traditionally dubbed by scholars as the First Triumvirate). The alliance greatly benefited the three men: Caesar passed legislation to distribute state lands as poor relief while also providing land for Pompey's veterans; he also had Pompey's eastern settlements ratified; for Crassus, he secured relief for tax farmers and a place on agrarian commission. Caesar won for himself the political support needed to acquire a profitable provincial command in Gaul and secure his political future.

Attempting first to pass portions of his programme through the Senate, Caesar found the curia obstinate. He thus unveiled his alliance with Pompey and Crassus and moved his legislation before the people instead. Political opposition to the allies was immense.

Caesar also facilitated the election of the former patrician Publius Clodius Pulcher to the tribunate for 58. Clodius set about depriving Caesar's senatorial enemies of two of their more obstinate leaders in Cato and Cicero. Clodius attempted to try Cicero for executing citizens without a trial during the Catiline conspiracy, resulting in Cicero going into self-imposed exile. Clodius also passed a bill that forced Cato to lead the invasion of Cyprus, which would keep him away from Rome for some years. Clodius also passed a law to expand the previous partial grain subsidy to a fully free grain dole for citizens.

Map of the Gallic Wars

After his term as consul in 59, Caesar was appointed to a five-year term as the proconsular Governor of Cisalpine Gaul (part of current northern Italy), Transalpine Gaul (current southern France) and Illyria (part of the modern Balkans). Caesar sought cause to invade Gaul (modern France and Belgium), which would give him the dramatic military success he sought. When two local tribes began to migrate on a route that would take them near (not into) the Roman province of Transalpine Gaul, Caesar had the barely sufficient excuse he needed for his Gallic Wars, fought between 58 and 49.

Caesar defeated large armies at major battles 58 and 57. In 55 and 54 he made two expeditions into Britain, the first Roman to do so. Caesar then defeated a union of Gauls at the Battle of Alesia, completing the Roman conquest of Transalpine Gaul. By 50, all of Gaul lay in Roman hands.

Clodius formed armed gangs that terrorised the city and eventually began to attack Pompey's followers, who in response funded counter-gangs formed by Titus Annius Milo. The political alliance of the triumvirate was crumbling. Domitius Ahenobarbus ran for the consulship in 55, promising to take Caesar's command from him. Eventually, the triumvirate was renewed at Lucca. Pompey and Crassus were promised the consulship in 55, and Caesar's term as governor was extended for five years. Beginning in the summer of 54, a wave of political corruption and violence swept Rome. This chaos reached a climax in January of 52, as Clodius and his allies shut down the government by vetoing the election of consuls. That month, Milo murdered Clodius after a chance encounter on the via Appia, leading to Pompey's occupation of the city as sole consul and a forcible restoration of order.

In 53, Crassus launched a Roman invasion of the Parthian Empire (modern Iraq and Iran). After initial successes, his army was cut off deep in enemy territory, surrounded and slaughtered at the Battle of Carrhae, in which Crassus himself perished. Crassus's death destabilised the Triumvirate. While Caesar was fighting in Gaul, Pompey proceeded with a legislative agenda for Rome that revealed that he was at best ambivalent towards Caesar. Pompey's wife, Julia, who was Caesar's daughter, died in childbirth. This event severed the last remaining bond between Pompey and Caesar. In 51, some Roman senators demanded that Caesar not be permitted to stand for consul unless he turned over control of his armies to the state. Caesar chose civil war over laying down his command and facing trial.

==== Caesar's civil war and dictatorship ====
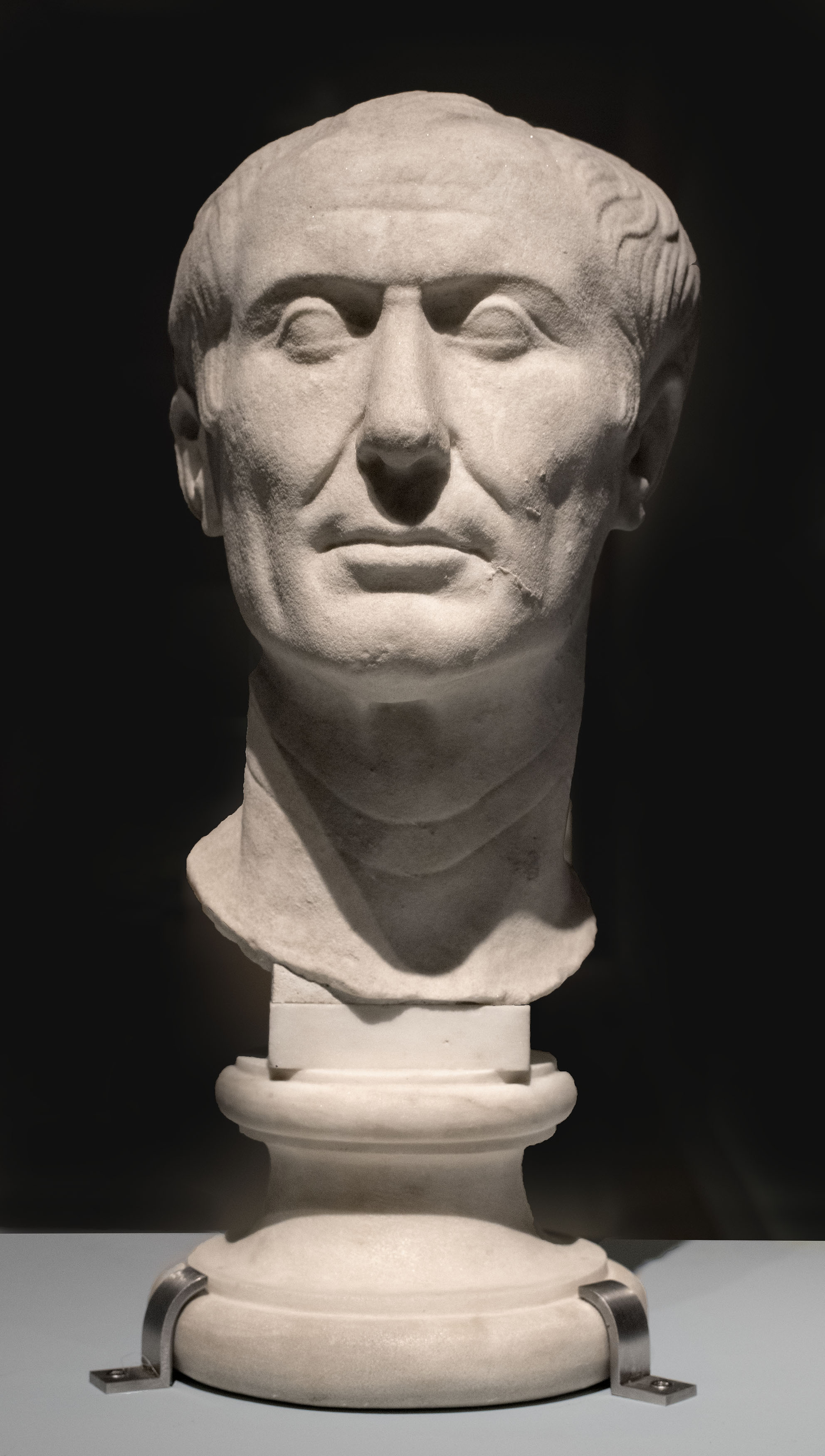
The Tusculum portrait, a Roman sculpture of Julius Caesar

On 1 January 49, an agent of Caesar presented an ultimatum to the senate. The ultimatum was rejected, and the senate then passed a resolution declaring that if Caesar did not lay down his arms by July of that year, he would be considered an enemy of the Republic. Meanwhile, the senators adopted Pompey as their new champion against Caesar, passing a senatus consultum ultimum that vested Pompey with dictatorial powers. On 10 January, Caesar with his veteran army crossed the river Rubicon, the legal boundary of Roman Italy beyond which no commander might bring his army, in violation of Roman laws, and by the spring of 49 swept down the Italian peninsula towards Rome. His rapid advance forced Pompey, the consuls and the senate to abandon Rome for Greece. Caesar entered the city unopposed. Afterwards Caesar turned his attention to the Pompeian stronghold of Hispania (modern Spain) but decided to tackle Pompey himself in Greece. Pompey initially defeated Caesar, but failed to follow up on the victory, and was decisively defeated at the Battle of Pharsalus in 48. Pompey fled again, this time to Egypt, where he was murdered.

Pompey's death did not end the civil war. In 46 Caesar lost perhaps as much as a third of his army, but ultimately came back to defeat the Pompeian army of Metellus Scipio in the Battle of Thapsus, after which the Pompeians retreated yet again to Hispania. Caesar then defeated the combined Pompeian forces at the Battle of Munda.

With Pompey defeated and order restored, Caesar wanted to achieve undisputed control over the government. The powers he gave himself were later assumed by his imperial successors. Caesar held both the dictatorship and the tribunate, and alternated between the consulship and the proconsulship. In 48, he was given permanent tribunician powers. This made his person sacrosanct, gave him the power to veto the senate, and allowed him to dominate the Plebeian Council. In 46, Caesar was given censorial powers, which he used to fill the senate with his partisans. He then raised the membership of the Senate to 900. This robbed the senatorial aristocracy of its prestige, and made it increasingly subservient to him. Caesar began to prepare for a war against the Parthian Empire. Since his absence from Rome would limit his ability to install consuls, he passed a law that allowed him to appoint all magistrates, and later all consuls and tribunes. This transformed the magistrates from representatives of the people to representatives of the dictator.

Caesar was now the primary figure of the Roman state, enforcing and entrenching his powers. His enemies feared that he had ambitions to become an autocratic ruler. Arguing that the Roman Republic was in danger, a group of senators led by Gaius Cassius and Marcus Brutus hatched a conspiracy and assassinated Caesar at a meeting of the Senate on 15 March 44. Virtually all the conspirators fled the city after Caesar's death in fear of retaliation.

==== Second Triumvirate ====
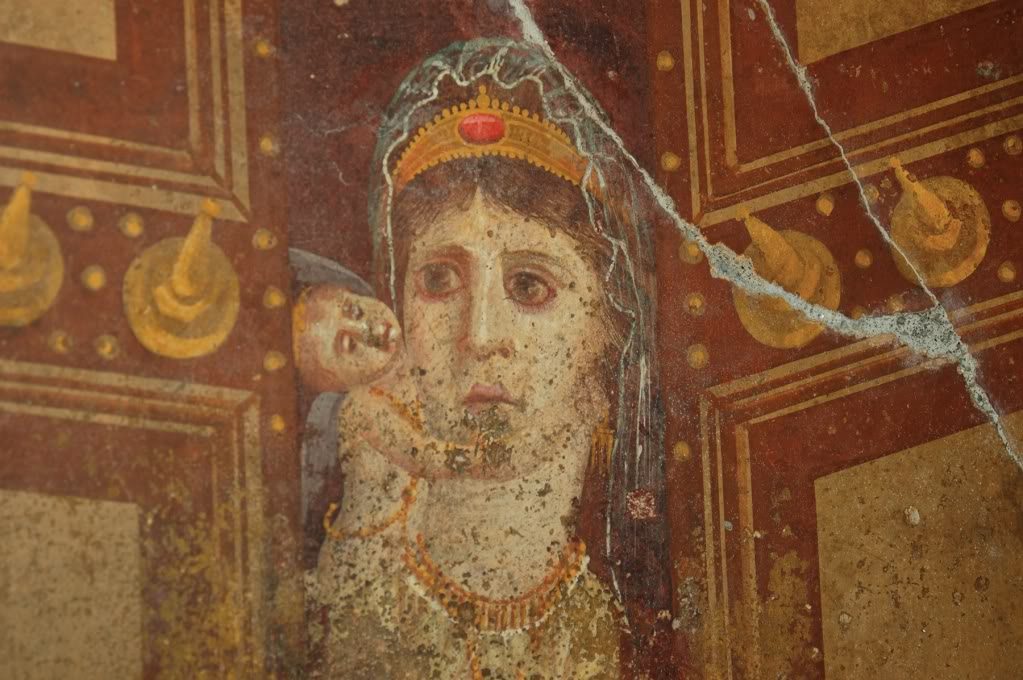
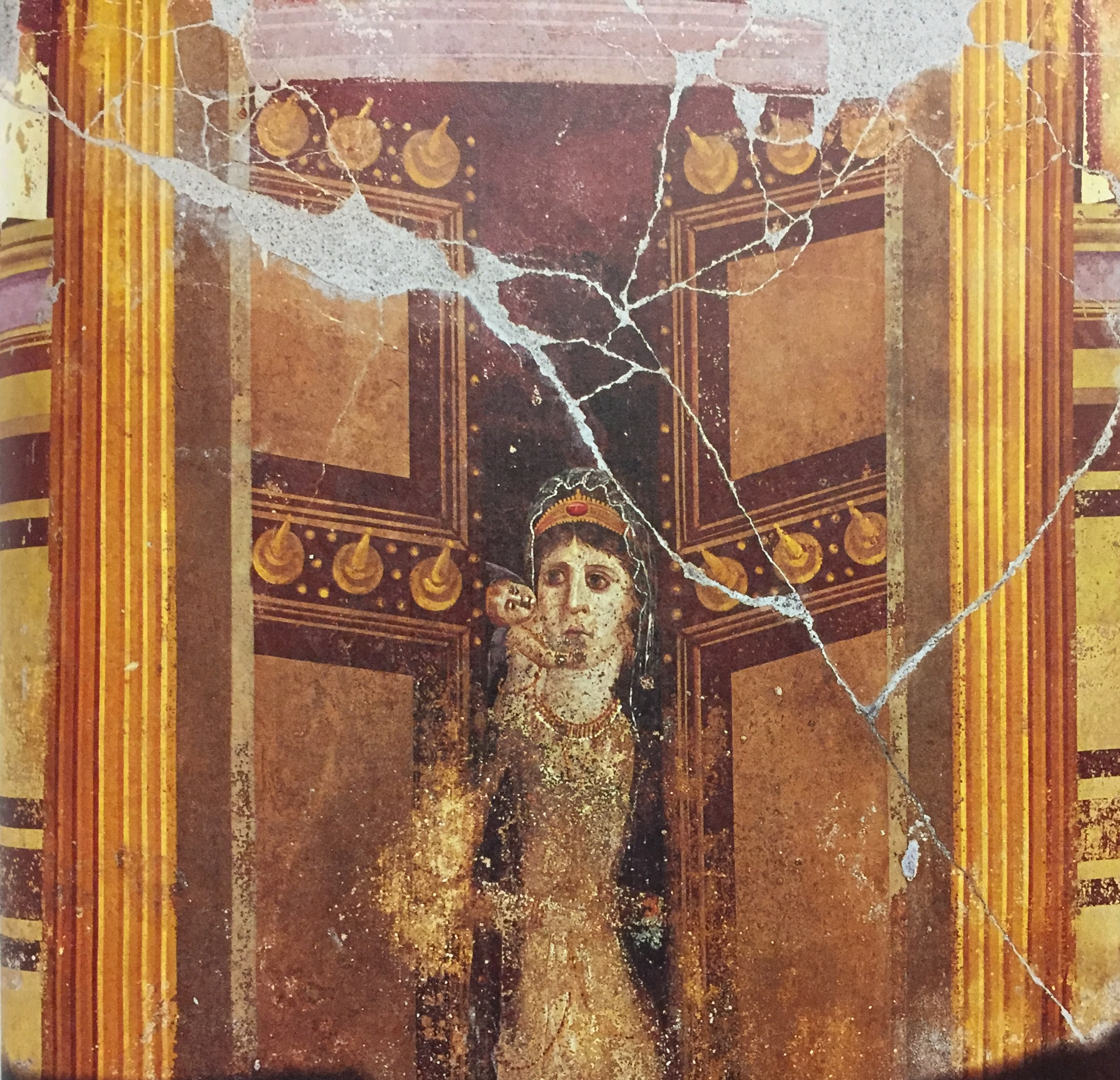
This mid-1st-century BC Roman wall painting in Pompeii is probably a depiction of Cleopatra VII as Venus Genetrix, with her son Caesarion as Cupid. Its owner Marcus Fabius Rufus most likely ordered its concealment behind a wall in reaction to the execution of Caesarion on orders of Octavian in 30 BC.

The civil wars that followed destroyed what was left of the Republic. After the assassination, Caesar's three most important associates Mark Antony (Caesar's co-consul), Octavian (Caesar's adopted son and great-nephew), and Lepidus (Caesar's magister equitum), formed an alliance known as the Second Triumvirate. The conspirators were defeated at the Battle of Philippi in 42.

Following Philippi, Rome's territories were divided between the triumvirs, but the agreement was fragile. Antony detested Octavian and spent most of his time in the East, while Lepidus favoured Antony but felt himself obscured by his colleagues. Following the defeat of Sextus Pompeius, a dispute between Lepidus and Octavian regarding the allocation of lands broke out and, in 36 BC, Lepidus was forced into exile in Circeii and stripped of all his offices except that of pontifex maximus. His former provinces were awarded to Octavian.

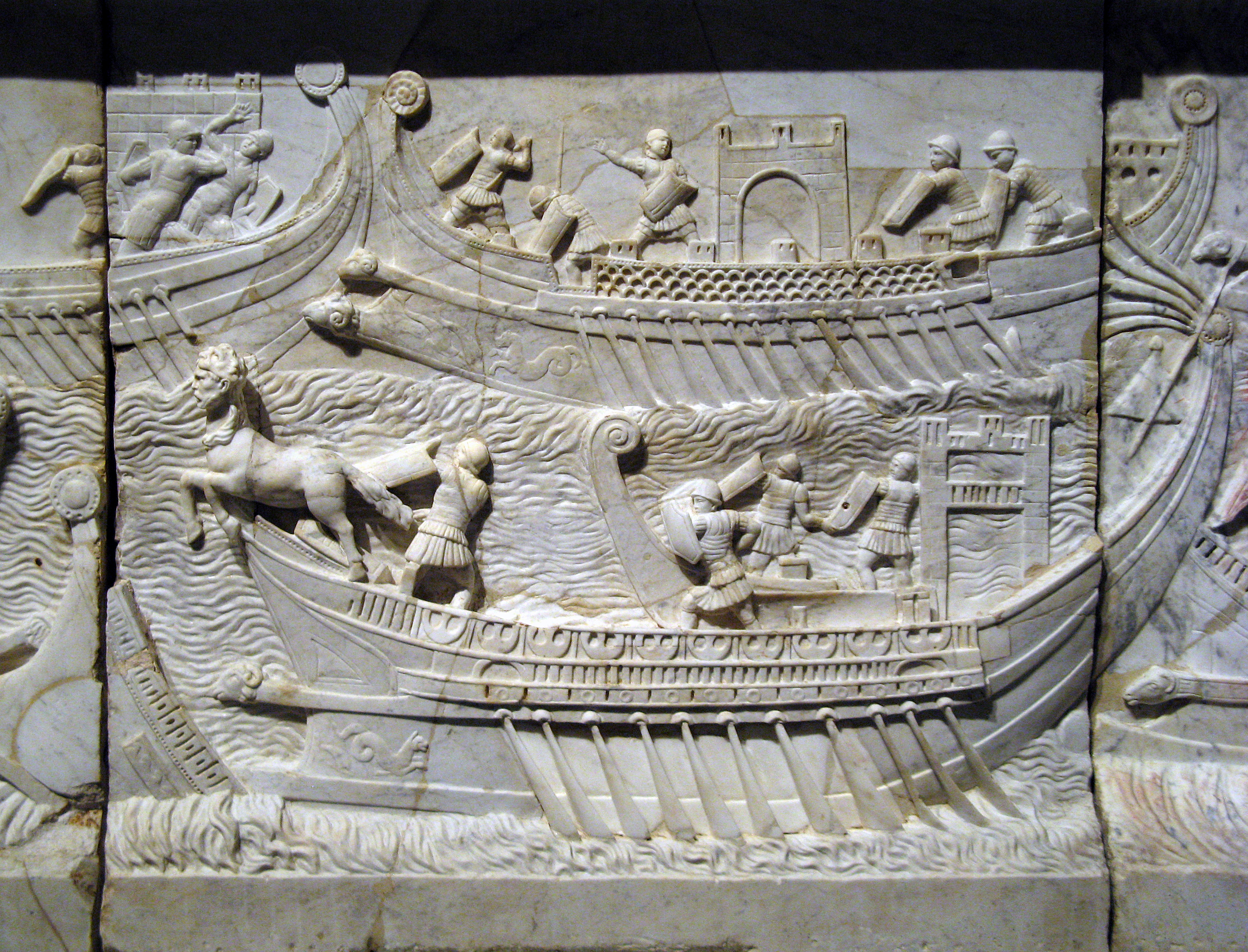
Scene from the naval battle of Actium. Detail of an early 1st-century relief (extensively restored).

Antony, meanwhile, married Caesar's lover, Cleopatra of Ptolemaic Egypt, intending to use wealthy Egypt as a base to dominate Rome. The ambitious Octavian built a power base of patronage and then launched a campaign against Antony. Another civil war broke out between Octavian on one hand and Antony and Cleopatra on the other. This culminated in the latter's defeat at Actium in 31 BC. Octavian's forces then invaded Egypt and occupied Alexandria, where Antony and Cleopatra both committed suicide in 30 BC.

Octavian was granted a series of special powers, including sole imperium within the city of Rome, permanent consular powers, and credit for every Roman military victory. In 27, the Senate granted him the name "Augustus", from which point he is generally considered the first Roman emperor.

== Constitutional system ==
The constitutional history of the Roman Republic began with the revolution that overthrew the monarchy in 509 BC and ended with constitutional reforms that transformed the Republic into what would effectively be the Roman Empire, in 27 BC. The Roman Republic's constitution was a constantly evolving, unwritten set of guidelines and principles passed down mainly through precedent, by which the government and its politics operated.

=== Senate ===
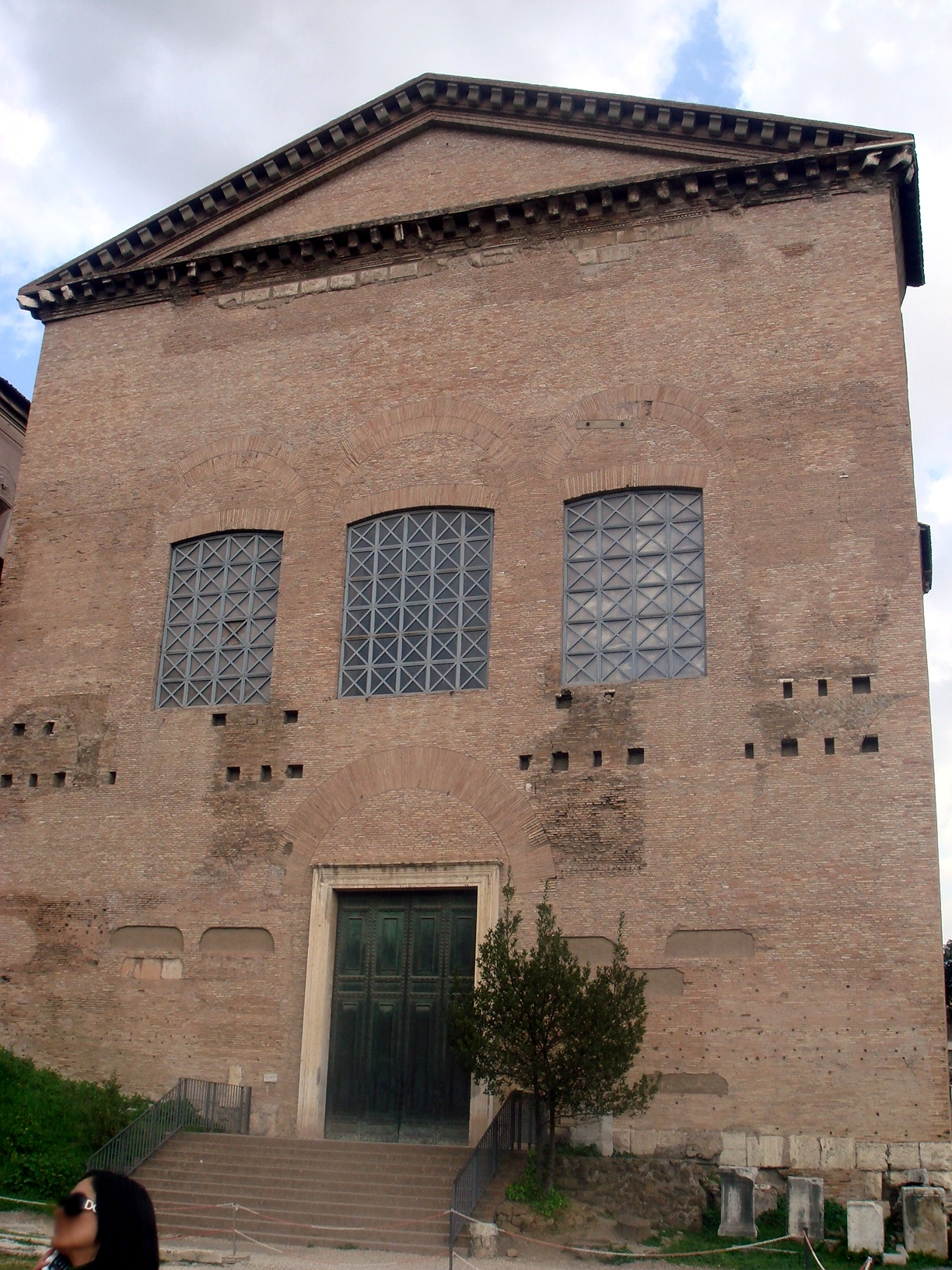
The Curia Julia, the senate house started by Julius Caesar in 44 BC and completed by Octavian in 29 BC, replacing the Curia Cornelia as the meeting place of the Senate

The senate's authority derived from the senators' esteem and prestige. This esteem and prestige were based on both precedent and custom, as well as the senators' calibre and reputation. The senate passed decrees called senatus consulta. These were officially "advice" from the senate to a magistrate, but in practice, the magistrates usually followed them. Through the course of the middle republic and Rome's expansion, the senate became more dominant in the state: the only institution with the expertise to administer the empire effectively, it controlled state finances, assignment of magistrates, external affairs, and deployment of military forces. Also, a powerful religious body, it received reports of omens and directed Roman responses thereto.

When its prerogatives started to be challenged in the 2nd century, the senate lost its customary preapproval for legislation. Moreover, after the precedent set in 121 BC with the killing of Gaius Gracchus, the senate claimed to assume the power to issue a senatus consultum ultimum: such decrees directed magistrates to take whatever actions were necessary to safeguard the state, irrespective of legality, and signalled the senate's willingness to support that magistrate if such actions were later challenged in the courts.

Its members were usually appointed by censors, who ordinarily selected newly elected magistrates for membership in the senate, making the senate a partially elected body. Status was not hereditary and there were always some new men, though sons of former magistrates found it easier to be elected to the qualifying magistracies. During emergencies, a dictator could be appointed for the purpose of appointing senators (as was done after the Battle of Cannae). However, by the end of the republic men such as Caesar and the members of the Second Triumvirate usurped these powers for themselves.

=== Legislative assemblies ===
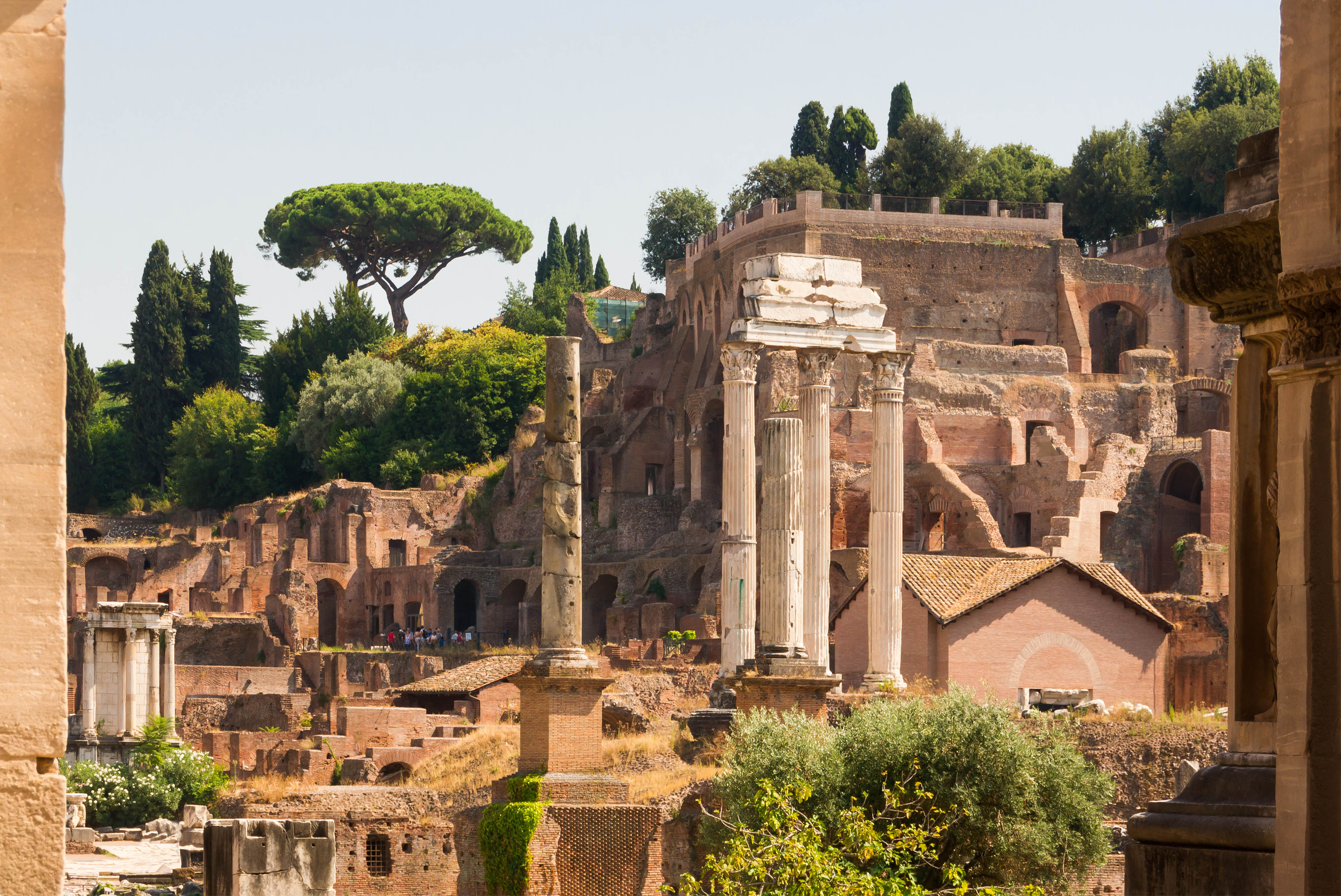
The Roman Forum, the commercial, cultural, religious, and political centre of the city and the Republic which housed the various offices and meeting places of the government

The legal status of Roman citizenship was limited and a vital prerequisite to possessing many important legal rights, such as the right to trial and appeal, marry, vote, hold office, enter binding contracts, and to special tax exemptions. An adult male citizen with the full complement of legal and political rights was called optimo iure (lit. 'having the greatest rights'). Citizens optimo iure could participate in assemblies that elected magistrates, enacted legislation, presided over trials in capital cases, declared war and peace, and forged or dissolved treaties. Assemblies were called comitia, in which all citizens optimo jure could vote, and concilia (sing. concilium), 'councils', for specific groups of citizens optimo jure, e.g., the plebeians.

Citizens optimo jure were organised on the basis of and divided into centuries and tribes. Each century or tribe cast a collective vote. The centuriate assembly (comitia centuriata) was said to be traced from the Roman centuries of soldiers, and was usually presided over by a consul. The centuries voted, one at a time, until a measure received support from a majority. The centuriate assembly elected magistrates who had imperium (consuls and praetors). It also elected censors. Only the centuriate assembly could declare war and ratify the results of a census. It served as the highest court of appeal in certain judicial cases.

The tribal assembly (comitia tributa) was presided over by a consul, and composed of 35 tribes. Once a measure received support from a majority of the tribes, voting ended. While it did not pass many laws, the tribal assembly did elect quaestors, curule aediles, and military tribunes. The plebeian council (concilium plebis) was identical to the tribal assembly, but excluded the patricians. They elected their own officers, plebeian tribunes and plebeian aediles. Usually, a plebeian tribune would preside over the assembly. This assembly passed most laws and could act as a court of appeal.

=== Magistrates ===
Each republican magistrate held certain constitutional powers. Each was assigned a provincia by the Senate. This was the scope of that particular office holder's authority. It could apply to a geographic area or to a particular responsibility or task. The powers of a magistrate came from the people of Rome (both plebeians and patricians). Imperium was held by both consuls and praetors. Strictly speaking, it was the authority to command a military force, but in reality, it carried broad authority in other public spheres, such as diplomacy and the justice system. In extreme cases, those with the imperium power could sentence Roman Citizens to death. All magistrates also had the power of coercitio (coercion). Magistrates used this to maintain public order by imposing punishment for crimes. Magistrates also had both the power and the duty to look for omens. This power could also be used to obstruct political opponents.

One check on a magistrate's power was collega (collegiality). Each magisterial office was held concurrently by at least two people. Another such check was provocatio. While in Rome, all citizens were protected from coercion, by provocatio, an early form of due process. It was a precursor to habeas corpus. If any magistrate tried to use the powers of the state against a citizen, that citizen could appeal the magistrate's decision to a tribune. In addition, once a magistrate's one-year term of office expired, he would have to wait ten years before serving in that office again. This created problems for some consuls and praetors, and these magistrates occasionally had their imperium extended. In effect, they retained the powers of the office (as a promagistrate) without officially holding that office.

In times of military emergency, a dictator was appointed for a term of six months. Constitutional government was dissolved, and the dictator was the absolute master of the state. When the dictator's term ended, constitutional government was restored.

The censor was a magistrate in ancient Rome who was responsible for maintaining the census, supervising public morality, and overseeing certain aspects of the government's finances. The power of the censor was absolute: no magistrate could oppose his decisions, and only another censor who succeeded him could cancel those decisions. The censor's regulation of public morality is the origin of the modern meaning of the words censor and censorship. During the census, they could enroll citizens in the senate or purge them from the senate.

The consuls of the Roman Republic were the highest-ranking ordinary magistrates. Each served for one year. Consular powers included the kings' former imperium and appointment of new senators. Consuls had supreme power in both civil and military matters. While in the city of Rome, the consuls were the head of the Roman government. They presided over the senate and the assemblies. While abroad, each consul commanded an army. His authority abroad was nearly absolute.

Since the tribunes were considered the embodiment of the plebeians, they were sacrosanct. Their sacrosanctity was enforced by a pledge the plebeians took to kill anyone who harmed or interfered with a tribune during his term of office. It was a capital offence to harm a tribune, disregard his veto, or otherwise interfere with him.

Praetors administered civil law and commanded provincial armies. Aediles were officers elected to conduct domestic affairs in Rome, such as managing public games and shows. The quaestors usually assisted the consuls in Rome, and the governors in the provinces. Their duties were often financial.

== Military ==
Rome's military secured Rome's territory and borders and helped to impose tribute on conquered peoples. Rome's armies had a formidable reputation; but Rome also "produced [its] share of incompetents" and catastrophic defeats. Nevertheless, it was generally the fate of Rome's greatest enemies, such as Pyrrhus and Hannibal, to win early battles but lose the war.

=== Hoplite armies ===
During this period, Roman soldiers seem to have been modelled after those of the Etruscans to the north, who themselves are believed to have copied their style of warfare from the Greeks. Traditionally, the introduction of the phalanx formation into the Roman army is ascribed to the city's penultimate king, Servius Tullius (ruled 578–534). The phalanx was effective in large, open spaces, but not on the hilly terrain of the central Italian peninsula. In the 4th century, the Romans replaced it with the more flexible manipular formation. This change is sometimes attributed to Marcus Furius Camillus and placed shortly after the Gallic invasion of 390; more likely, it was copied from Rome's Samnite enemies to the south.

=== Manipular legion ===
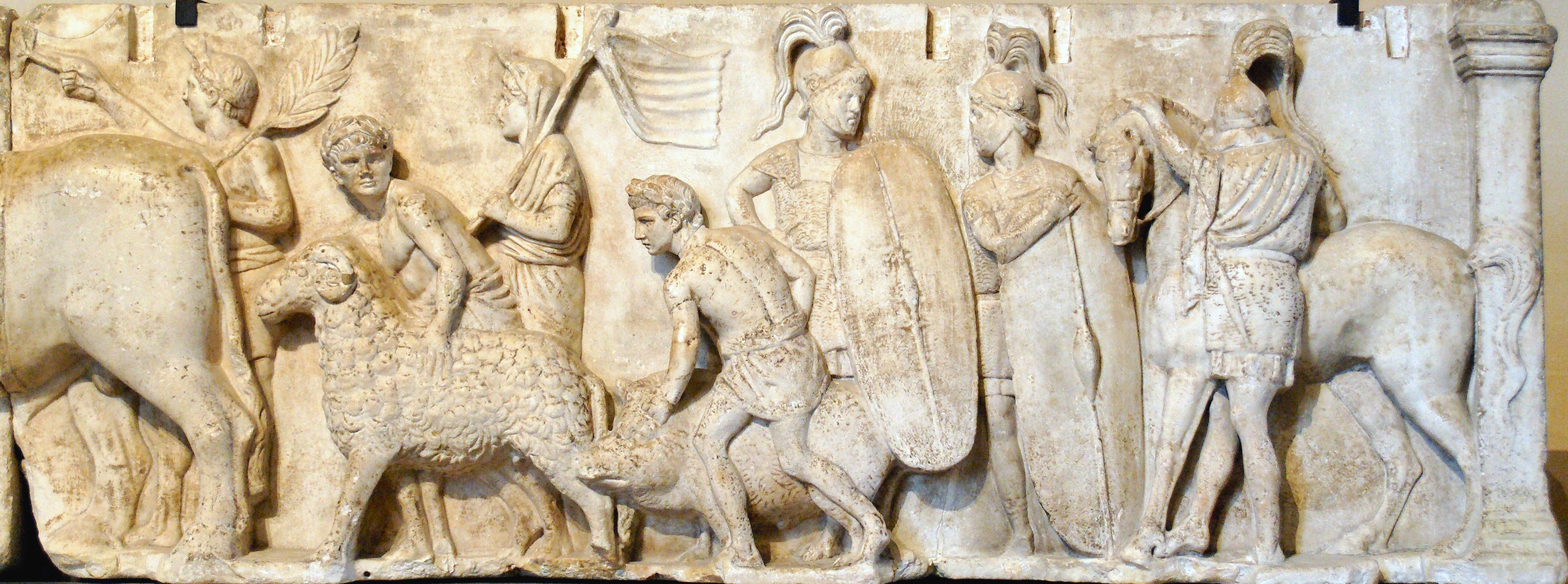
Detail from the Ahenobarbus relief showing (centre-right) two Roman foot-soldiers c. 122 BC. Depicted are Montefortino-style helmets with horsehair plume, chain mail cuirasses with shoulder reinforcement, oval shields with calfskin covers, gladius and pilum.

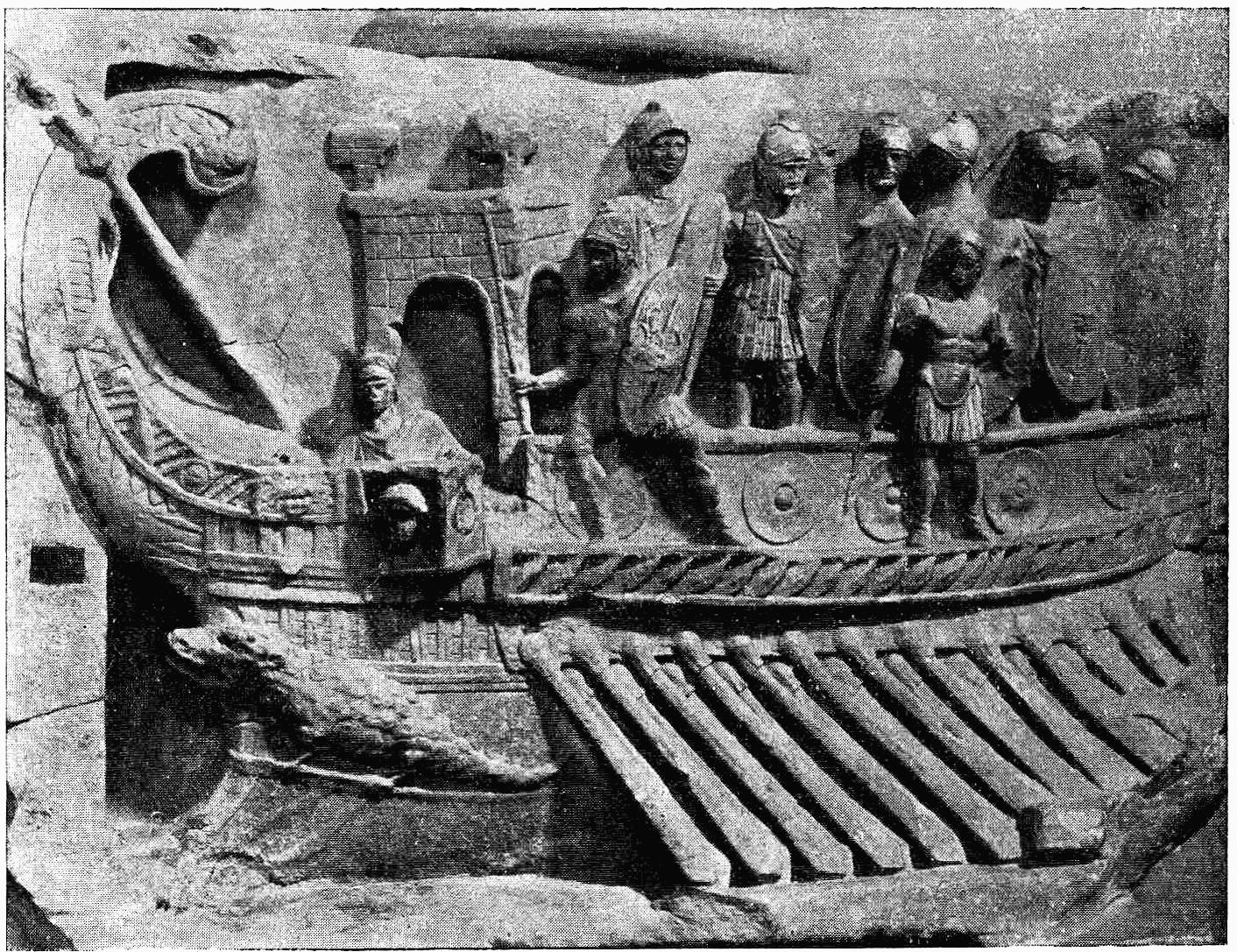
A Roman naval bireme depicted in a relief from the Temple of Fortuna Primigenia in Praeneste, c. 120 BC; now in the Museo Pio-Clementino in the Vatican Museums

During this period, an army formation of around 5,000 men (of both heavy and light infantry) was known as a legion. Maniples were units of 120 men each drawn from a single infantry class. They were typically deployed into three discrete lines based on the three heavy infantry types:

1. The first line maniple was the hastati, infantry soldiers who wore a bronze breastplate and a bronze helmet and carried an iron-clad wooden shield. They were armed with a sword and two throwing spears.
2. The second line were the principes. They were armed and armoured in the same manner as the hastati, but wore a lighter coat of mail.
3. The triarii formed the third line. They were the last remnant of the hoplite-style troops in the Roman army. They were armed and armoured like the principes, but carried a lighter spear.

The three infantry classes may have retained some slight parallel to social divisions within Roman society, but at least officially the three lines were based upon age and experience rather than social class. Young, unproven men served in the first line, older men with some military experience in the second, and veteran troops of advanced age and experience in the third.

The heavy infantry of the maniples was supported by a number of light infantry and cavalry troops, typically 300 horsemen per manipular legion. The cavalry was drawn primarily from the richest class of equestrians. There was an additional class of troops that followed the army without specific martial roles and was deployed to the rear of the third line. Its role in accompanying the army was primarily to supply any vacancies that might occur in the maniples. The light infantry consisted of 1,200 unarmoured skirmishing troops drawn from the youngest and lower social classes. They were armed with a sword, a small shield, and several light javelins.

Rome's military confederation with the other peoples of the Italian peninsula meant that half of its army was provided by the Socii. According to Polybius, Rome could draw on 770,000 men at the beginning of the Second Punic War, of which 700,000 were infantry and 70,000 met the requirements for cavalry.

A small navy had operated at a fairly low level after about 300, but it was massively upgraded about 40 years later, during the First Punic War. After a period of frenetic construction, the navy mushroomed to more than 400 ships on the Carthaginian ("Punic") pattern. Once completed, it could accommodate up to 100,000 sailors and embarked troops for battle. The navy thereafter declined in size.

In 217, near the beginning of the Second Punic War, Rome was forced to effectively ignore its long-standing principle that its soldiers must be both citizens and property owners. Severe social stresses, population decline, and the greater collapse of the middle classes meant that the Roman state was forced to arm its soldiers at the expense of the state, which it had not had to do before. The distinction between the heavy infantry types began to blur, perhaps because the state was now assuming the responsibility of providing standard-issue equipment. In addition, the shortage of available manpower led to a greater burden upon Rome's allies for the provision of allied troops. Eventually, the Romans were forced to begin hiring mercenaries to fight alongside the legions.

=== Late Republican legions ===
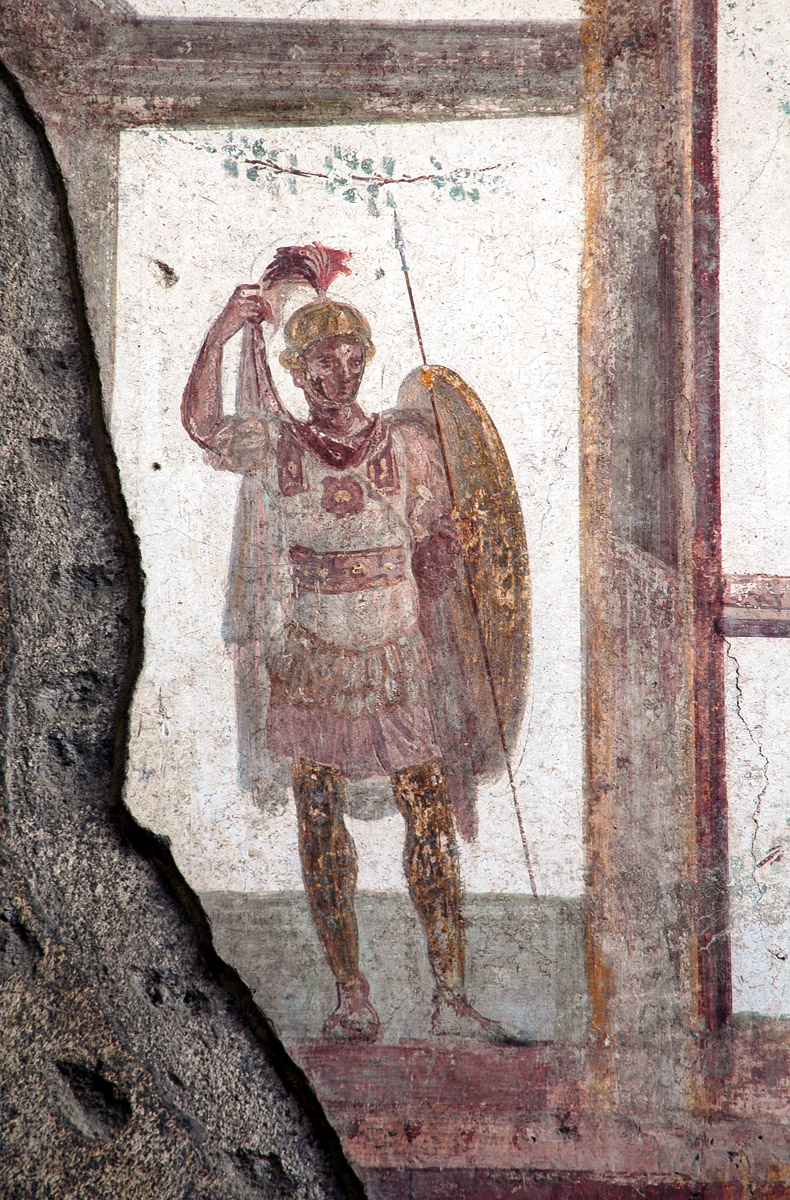
A Roman soldier depicted in a fresco in Pompeii, c. 80–20 BC

The organisation of the legions evolved throughout the Republican period. In 107, all citizens, regardless of their wealth or social class, were made eligible for entry into the Roman army. The distinction among the three heavy infantry classes, which had already blurred, had collapsed into a single class of heavy legionary infantry. The heavy infantry legionaries were drawn from citizen stock, while non-citizens came to dominate the ranks of the light infantry. The army's higher-level officers and commanders were still drawn exclusively from the Roman aristocracy. Unlike earlier in the Republic, legionaries were no longer fighting on a seasonal basis to protect their land. Instead, they received standard pay and were employed by the state on a fixed-term basis. As a consequence, military duty began to appeal most to the poorest sections of society, to whom a salaried pay was attractive.

The legions of the late Republic were almost entirely heavy infantry. The main legionary sub-unit was a cohort of approximately 480 infantrymen, further divided into six centuries of 80 men each. Each century comprised 10 "tent groups" of eight men. Cavalry were used as scouts and dispatch riders rather than as battlefield forces. Legions also contained a dedicated group of artillery crew of perhaps 60 men. Each legion was normally partnered with an approximately equal number of allied (non-Roman) troops.

The army's most obvious deficiency lay in its shortage of cavalry, especially heavy cavalry. Particularly in the East, Rome's slow-moving infantry legions were often confronted by fast-moving cavalry troops and found themselves at a tactical disadvantage.

After Rome's subjugation of the Mediterranean, its navy declined in size, although it underwent short-term upgrading and revitalisation in the late Republic to meet several new demands. Julius Caesar assembled a fleet to cross the English Channel and invade Britannia. Pompey raised a fleet to deal with the Cilician pirates who threatened Rome's Mediterranean trading routes. During the civil war that followed, as many as 1,000 ships were either constructed or pressed into service from Greek cities.

== Social structure ==
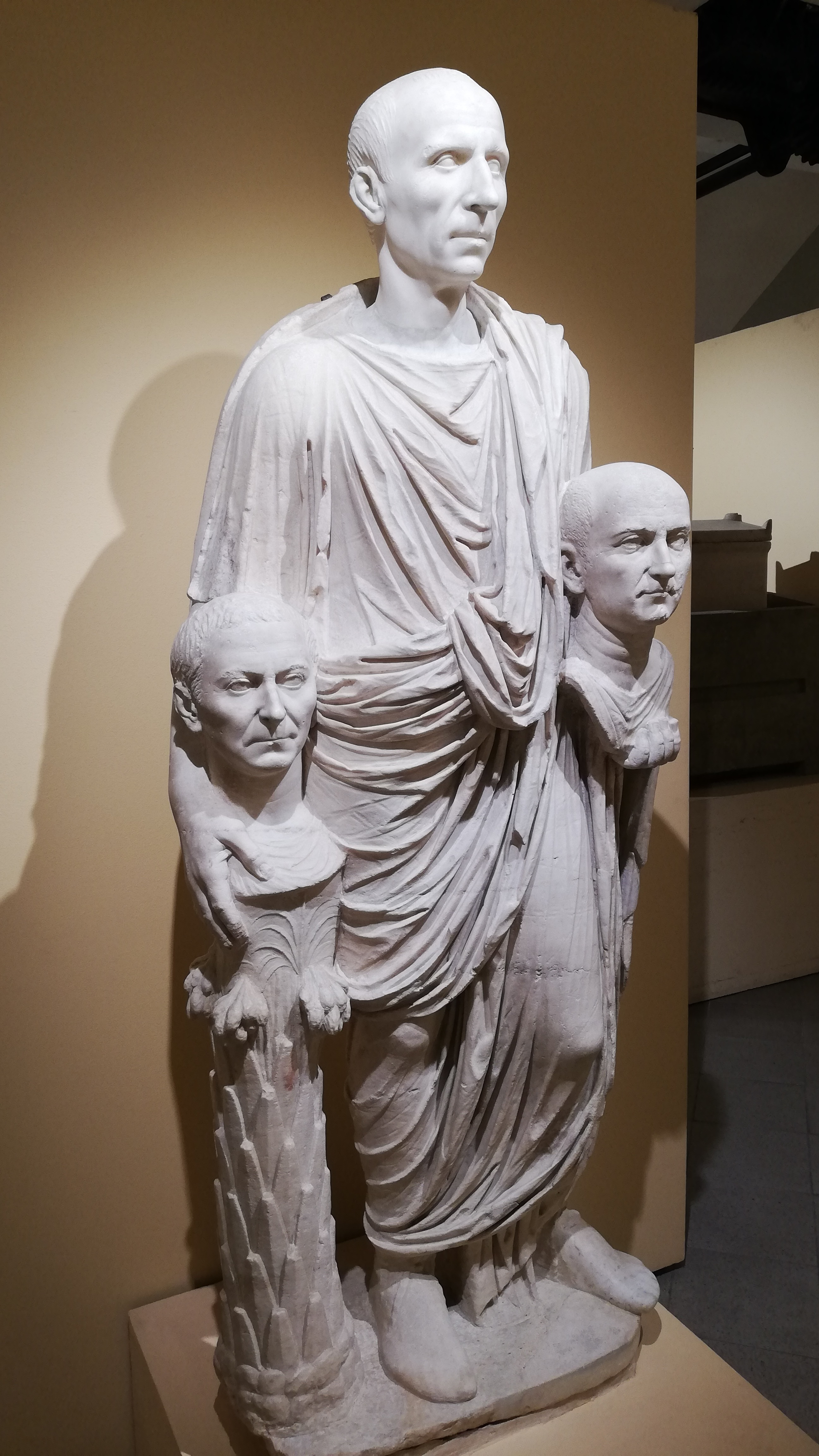
The "Togatus Barberini", depicting a Roman senator holding the imagines (effigies) of deceased ancestors in his hands; marble, late 1st century BC; head (not belonging): mid-1st century BC

Citizen families were headed by the family's oldest male, the pater familias, who was lawfully entitled to exercise complete authority (patria potestas) over family property and all family members. Citizenship offered legal protection and rights, but citizens who offended Rome's traditional moral code could be declared infamous and lose certain legal and social privileges. Citizenship was also taxable, and undischarged debt was potentially a capital offence. A form of limited, theoretically voluntary slavery (debt bondage, or nexum) allowed wealthy creditors to negotiate payment of debt through bonded service. Poor, landless citizens of the lowest class (proletarii) might contract their sons to a creditor, patron or third party employer to obtain an income or pay off family debts. Nexum was abolished only when slave labour became more readily available, most notably during the Punic wars.

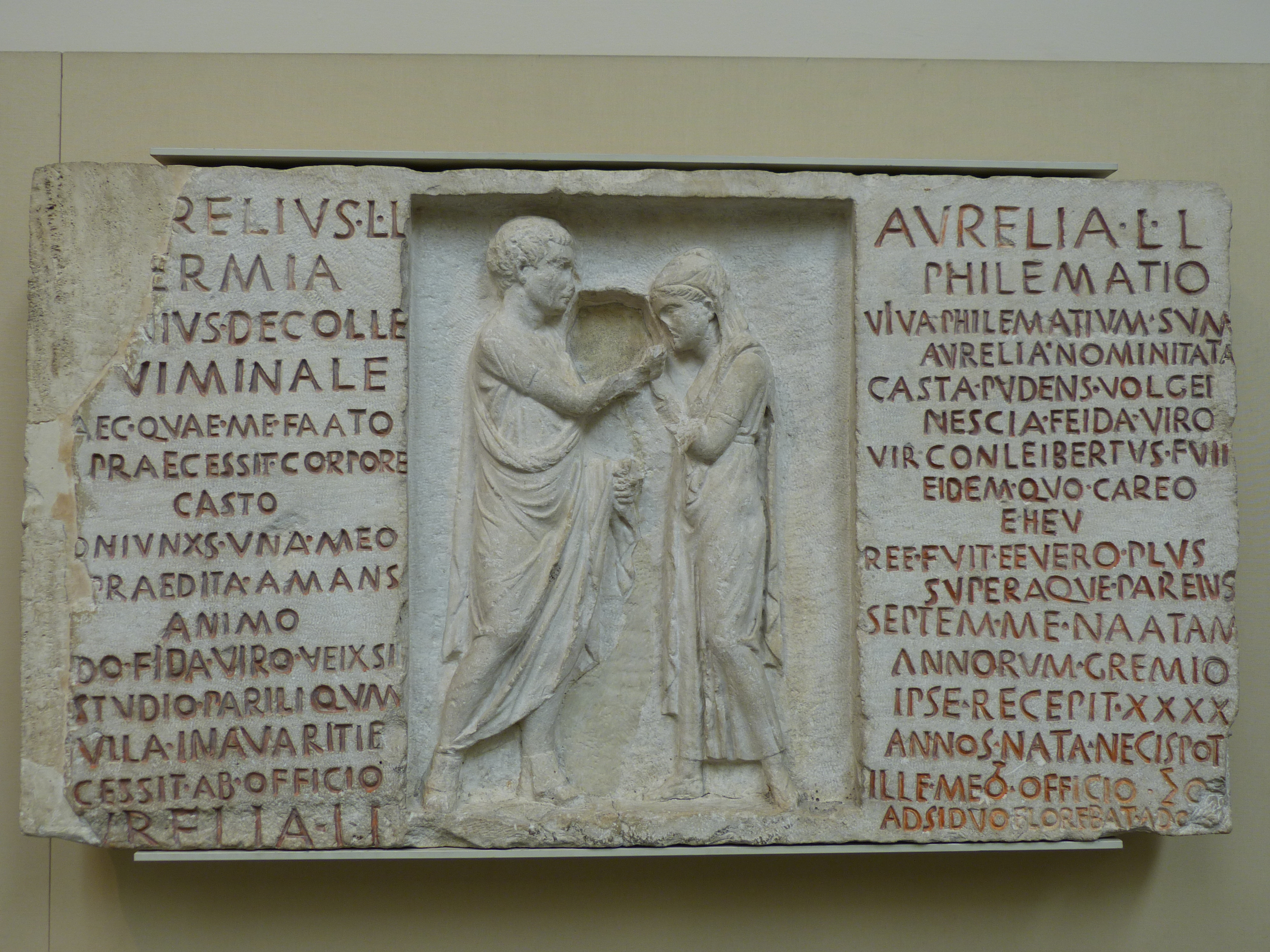
An inscribed funerary relief of Aurelius Hermia and his wife Aurelia Philematio, former slaves who married after their manumission, 80 BC, from a tomb along the Via Nomentana in Rome

Slaves could be bought, sold, acquired through warfare, or born and raised in slavery. There were no legal limits on the slave-owner's power over them. A few slaves were freed by their owners, becoming freedmen and in some circumstances citizens too. This degree of social mobility was unusual in the ancient world but itself limited; for example, freedmen were seen as permanently tainted, and their children could not become magistrates. Freedmen could play notable roles in various crafts and trades, particularly those who had been manumitted by the upper classes. Freed slaves and the master who freed them retained certain legal and moral mutual obligations.

At the other extreme were the senatorial families of the landowning nobility, both patrician and plebeian, bound by shifting allegiances and mutual competition. A plebiscite of 218 forbade senators and their sons to engage in substantial trade or money-lending. A wealthy equestrian class emerged, not subject to the same trading constraints as senators.

One of Rome's fundamental social and economic institutions was the client-patron relationship; its obligations were largely moral and social rather than legal, but permeated society, including in politics.

Citizen men and citizen women were expected to marry, produce as many children as possible, and improve—or at worst, conserve—their family's wealth, fortune, and public profile. Marriage offered opportunities for political alliance and social advancement. Patricians usually married in a form known as confarreatio, which transferred the bride from her father's legal control (manus) to that of her husband. Patrician status could be inherited only through birth; an early law, introduced by the reactionary Decemviri but rescinded in 445, sought to prevent marriages between patricians and plebeians. (Note: The plebeian involved in such a marriage would likely have been wealthy: see Cornell 1995, p. 255) Among ordinary plebeians, different marriage forms offered married women considerable more freedom than their patrician counterparts, until manus marriage was replaced by free marriage, in which the wife remained under her absent father's legal authority, not her husband's. Infant mortality was high. Towards the end of the Republic, the birthrate began to fall among the elite. Some wealthy, childless citizens resorted to adoption to provide male heirs for their estates and to forge political alliances. Adoption was subject to the senate's approval.

== People and economy ==
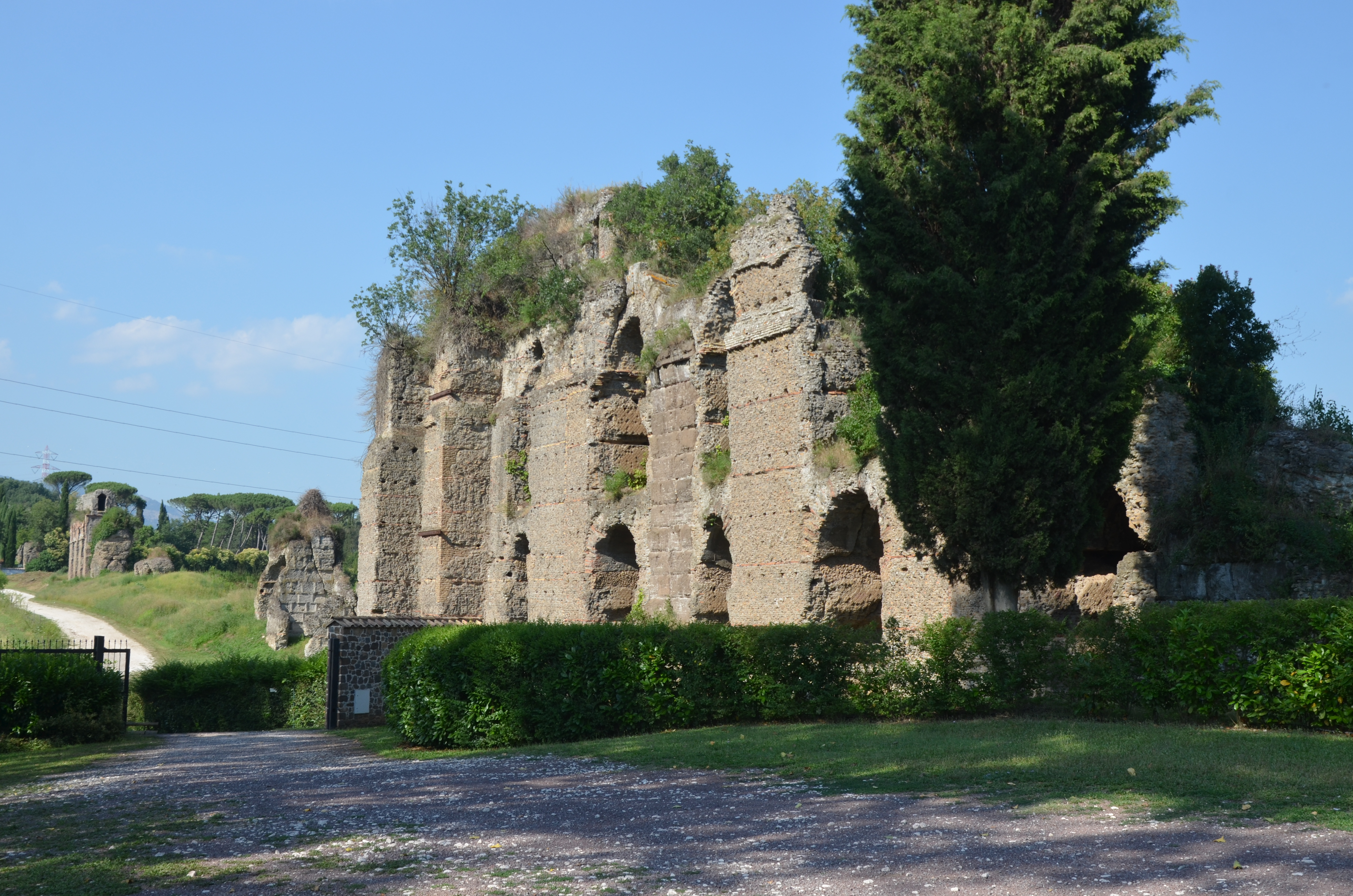
Ruins of the Aqua Anio Vetus, a Roman aqueduct built in 272 BC

The Roman Republic's economy was predominantly agrarian, but also highly complex. As the Romans continued to conquer the Mediterranean basin, it became fully integrated with the wider Mediterranean economy, a process which completed during the first century BC. The population of the republic expanded considerably during the centuries of its existence; indeed, the vastness of the Roman citizen population was part of how it was able to mobilise such expansive military power.

Agricultural production during the republic was highly regional. Literary evidence from ancient elite writers was highly simplifying and is not entirely consistent with the regional differences revealed by modern archaeology. Such differences were driven not only by soil productivity but also market access, mainly mediated by distance from large urban centres such as Rome, and changes in tenancy.

=== Demography ===
Evidence for the republic's population largely comes from thirty-nine republican and early imperial censuses. The reported population increased substantially from the first, reporting 130,000 Romans in 509 BC, to the last, reporting 4,937,000 in AD 14. It is generally believed that the censuses prior to those of Augustus starting in 28 BC reported only free adult males. It is also not clear to what extent these census figures include (or not) the expansion of citizenship through the Roman conquest of Italy and the late republican extension of citizenship to Transpadane Gaul from 49 BC, the manumission of slaves (slaves received citizenship when manumitted), losses from war, and losses to non-citizen towns.

There was fierce debate over the population of Italy from the third century onwards. Estimates of the Italian population c. 225 BC place it around 4.5 million. This debate is based both on censuses and also on arguments from grain accounting and survey archaeology. The two main approaches were the "low" and "high" counts. The former posited that at the end of the republic there was an Italian population of around four million which was sightly lower than that of the estimated 4.5 million in 225. The high count, on the other hand, suggested that the population of the peninsula had increased to between seven and twelve million.

More recent approaches have suggested a "middle" count which views the census in terms of a device for counting military-age males which under the empire transformed into one to further imperial expansionist ideology. This reconstruction argues that imperial censuses inflated numbers, relative to their republican counterparts, by inclusion of women and children who were legally independent. This middle count instead suggests an Italian population between 4.6 and 5.9 million. All three modern accounts, however, are generally agreed to suggest an increase in the population of Italy which precludes ancient narratives of rural depopulation.

The population of all Roman possessions at the death of Augustus was in excess of 54 million, with considerable population flows across the Mediterranean basin. The population of Rome itself in the early imperial period was around one million, which it may have reached during the late republic by 57 BC, with other large cities such as Alexandria or Pergamum having between 100,000 and 300,000 inhabitants.

=== Agriculture ===
The agricultural production of republican-era Italy was concentrated in cereals (barley, wheat, and millet), vines, and olives. Grasses and legumes would have required irrigation; localised decay of such infrastructure may in part explain depopulation. Animal pasture was possible on the Apennines and low-lying plains during the winter seasons. Much of the peninsula was not yet cleared for farmland; the old-growth forests provided pasture for pigs, served as a habitat for other wild game, and were a source of timber. Areas of Italy were specialised in terms of their agricultural exports: Campania was notable for its wine and olives; other areas, like the Po Valley, Samnium, and the Apennine highlands generally, were noted for sheep and pig raising. The emergence of large urban elites in the late republic also catalysed the creation of villas close to cities to raise and grow luxury items for local consumption.

Faced with increasing competition from provincial and allied grain suppliers, many Roman farmers turned to more profitable crops, especially grapes for wine production. By the late Republican era, Roman wine had been transformed from an indifferent local product for local consumption to a major domestic and export commodity, with some renowned, costly and collectable vintages.

Agricultural tooling was continuous with earlier Iron Age tools: wheel-less and mouldboard-less ploughs with sickles. Powered by man (free or slave) and animal, most farms were relatively small. Even large farms were dependent on hired slave or free labour. Labour was necessary to take in the harvest and operate farm machinery, such as olive and grape presses. Evidence of olive and grape vines' ubiquitousness suggests polyculture was commonly employed to diversify a farm's agricultural output. Such practices also extended to simple crop rotations with fallow fields and legumes such as peas, chickpeas, and lentils.

Non-agricultural gathering was also common in rural areas. Subsistence farming and gathering of this sort was the norm and commercial agriculture was concentrated only in areas on the coast and close to Rome, where there was urban demand large-scale commercial agricultural operations.

Farming was not the only form of agriculture. Cattle were also bred to provide traction, along with meat and hides as a by-product, with horses, mules, and donkeys also bred for tractive purposes. Other animals, such as sheep and pigs, were also raised for their wool and meat respectively. Pigs especially bred prolifically and could be raised at little cost by any small farmer with rights to pannage. In many parts of Roman Italy, transhumance was also predominant, with shepherds leading flocks from the lowlands in winter to highlands in summer for grazing.

=== Industry ===
The mining and processing of metals was a core part of Roman industry. During the early republic Italy itself was generally considered to be rich in copper and iron, but by the late republic these deposits had been largely exhausted. Mining by the second century BC had moved to Elba and Cisalpine Gaul. But the taking of Spain from Carthage during the Second Punic War opened huge and profitable mines in Iberia. Techniques for mining were sophisticated, with complex mechanisms to pump and move water for industrial purposes.

Textile manufacture was in part domestic, with notable production at Rome and in Sicily. Production was likely organised via subcontracting networks which split up work between large numbers of small workshops.

=== Trade, money, and finance ===
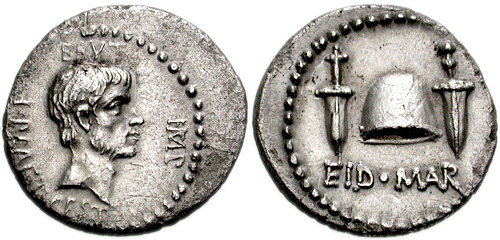
One of the most famous Roman denarii, the Ides of March coin was minted by the tyrannicide Brutus during the late republic in 42 BC.

Trade at Rome was well underway by the second century BC, with the development of a large port district (eventually stretching two kilometres) on the banks of the Tiber in central Rome. Large warehouses also were erected in the area. The republican period also saw, after the institution of Roman hegemony over the peninsula, the emergence of Brundisium and Puteoli as major ports in place of Tarentum and Naples. With the ports came partnerships to dispatch, send, and profit off maritime trade. Such partnerships, called societates, also allowed under formal laws the grouping of the partners' capital to productive ends such as running mines and production.

The largest partnerships were the societates publicanorum. These partnerships, which expanded with the empire, took government contracts for matters such as tax farming (where a partnership paid the state a fee for the right to collect taxes on its behalf), operation of large mines or quarries, and provision of supplies to soldiers or building projects. Due to their importance to the state, they also came to have a fully corporate existence, outliving their partners – most partnerships otherwise dissolved if one of the partners died – with inheritable shares (partes), directors (magistri), shareholder meetings for corporate governance.

Roman coinage emerged during the republic. The denarius, a silver coin, was introduced c. 211 BC worth at the time 10 bronze asses. Currency remained bimetallic (silver and bronze) through the whole period, though bronze decreased in value over time and the standard unit of account remained the bronze sestertius worth a quarter denarius. These coins were minted under the supervision of the tresviri monetales, junior magistrates who supervised the mint. Other magistrates, such as the aediles and praetors, also had powers to regulate markets and judge commercial disputes.

Large transactions were conducted with gold bars or through banking intermediaries, especially by exchange of large debts owed by and between aristocrats. Banks emerged by the second century BC in two types (deposit-taking banking firms called argentariae and aristocratic financiers) and are poorly attested in the literary evidence of the late republic. It would not have been possible to conduct large business transactions (including the making of loans) without them. Deposit and lending activities by the first century were so ubiquitous to be little worth mentioning in the Ciceronean corpus, though the effects of conquest on financiers in the late republic is well attested.

== Religion ==
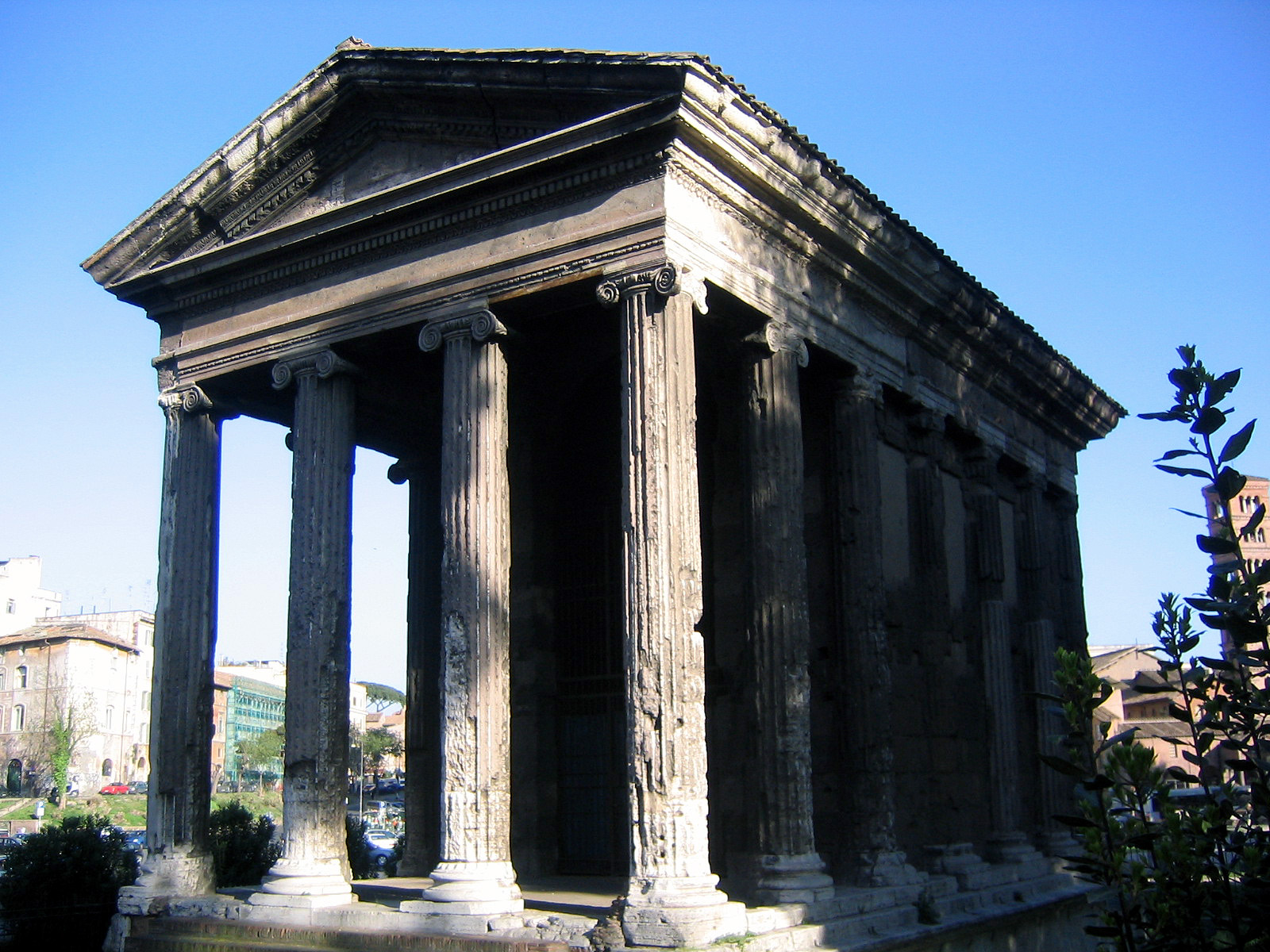
The Temple of Portunus, god of grain storage, keys, livestock and ports. Rome, built between 120 and 80 BC

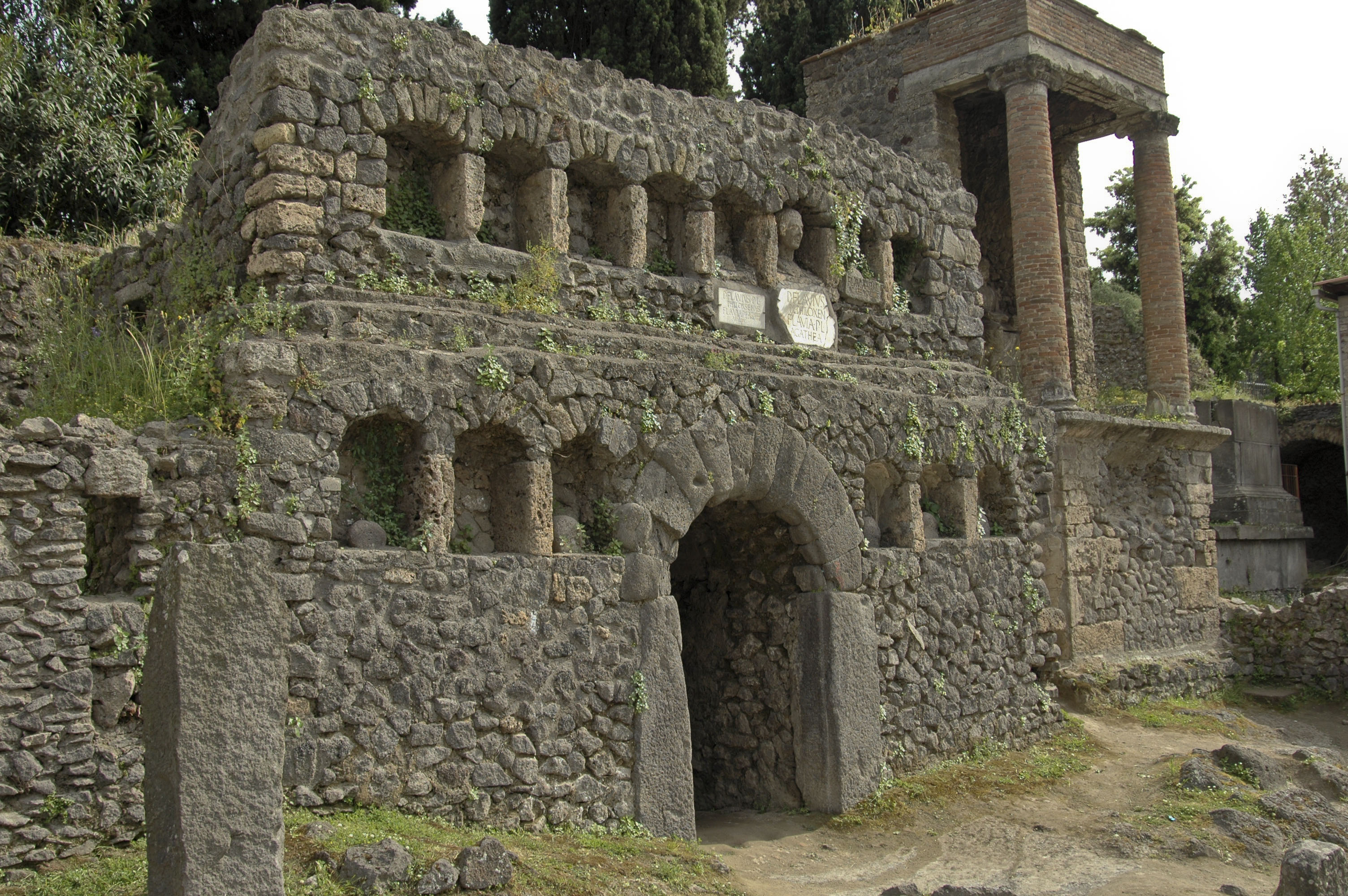
The tomb of the Flavii, a necropolis outside the Nucerian gate (Porta Nocera) of Pompeii, Italy, constructed 50–30 BC

Republican Rome's religious practices harked back to Rome's quasi-mythical history. Romulus, a son of Mars, founded Rome after Jupiter granted him favourable bird-signs regarding the site. Numa Pompilius, Rome's second king, had established its basic religious and political institutions after direct instructions from the gods, given through augury, dreams and oracle. Each king thereafter was credited with some form of divinely approved innovation, adaptation or reform. (Note: King Numa Pompilius was also said to have consorted with the nymph Egeria. The myths surrounding king Servius Tullius include his divine fathering by a Lar of the royal household, or by Vulcan, god of fire; and his love-affair with the goddess Fortuna.) An Imperial-era source claims that the Republic's first consul, Brutus, effectively abolished human sacrifice to the goddess Mania, instituted by the last king, Tarquinius. (Note: Macrobius describes the woollen figurines (maniae) hung at crossroad shrines during the popular Compitalia festival as substitutions for ancient human sacrifice once held at the same festival and suppressed by Rome's first consul, L. Junius Brutus. Whatever the truth regarding this sacrifice and its abolition, the Junii celebrated their ancestor cult during Larentalia rather than the usual Parentalia even in the 1st century BC; see Taylor 1925, pp. 302ff.)

Romans acknowledged the existence of innumerable deities who controlled the natural world and human affairs. The Roman state's well-being depended on its state deities, whose opinions and will could be discerned by priests and magistrates, trained in augury, haruspicy, oracles and the interpretation of omens. The gods were thought to communicate their wrath (ira deorum) through prodigies (unnatural or aberrant phenomena).

Individuals, occupations and locations had their own protective tutelary deity, or several. Each was associated with a particular, highly prescriptive form of prayer and sacrifice. Piety (pietas) was the correct, dutiful and timely performance of such actions. The well-being of each Roman household was thought to depend on daily cult to its Lares and Penates (guardian deities, or spirits), ancestors, and the divine generative essence embodied within its pater familias. A family which neglected its religious responsibilities could not expect to prosper.

Roman religious authorities were unconcerned with personal beliefs or privately funded cults unless they offended natural or divine laws or undermined the mos maiorum (roughly, "the way of the ancestors"); the relationship between gods and mortals should be sober, contractual, and of mutual benefit. Undignified grovelling, excessive enthusiasm (superstitio) and secretive practices were "weak-minded" and morally suspect. Magical practices were officially banned, as attempts to subvert the will of the gods for personal gain but were probably common among all classes. Private cult organisations that seemed to threaten Rome's political and priestly hierarchy were investigated by the Senate, with advice from the priestly colleges. The Republic's most notable religious suppression was that of the Bacchanalia, a widespread, unofficial, enthusiastic cult to the Greek wine-god Bacchus. The cult organisation was ferociously suppressed, and its deity was absorbed within the official cult to Rome's own wine god, Liber. The official recognition, adoption and supervision of foreign deities and practices had been an important unitary feature in Rome's territorial expansion and dominance since the days of the kings.

=== Priesthoods ===
With the abolition of monarchy, some of its sacral duties were shared by the consuls, while others passed to a Republican rex sacrorum ("king of the sacred rites"), a patrician "king", elected for life, with great prestige but no executive or kingly powers. Rome had no specifically priestly class or caste. As every family's pater familias was responsible for his family's cult activities, he was effectively the senior priest of his own household. In the early Republic, the patricians, as "fathers" to the Roman people, claimed the right of seniority to lead and control the state's relationship with the divine. Patrician families, in particular the Cornelii, Postumii and Valerii, monopolised the leading state priesthoods. The patrician Flamen Dialis employed the "greater auspices" (auspicia maiora) to consult with Jupiter on significant matters of state.

Twelve "lesser flaminates" (Flamines minores) were open to plebeians or reserved to them. They included a Flamen Cerealis in service of Ceres, goddess of grain and growth, and protector of plebeian laws and tribunes. The priesthoods of local urban and rustic Compitalia street festivals, dedicated to the lares of local communities, were open to freedmen and slaves..

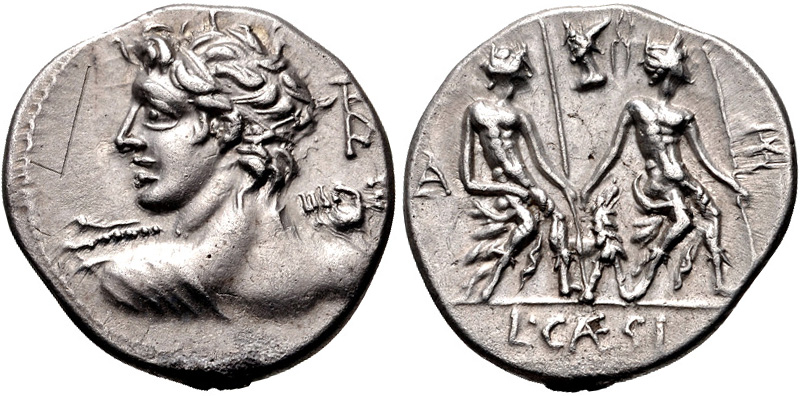
Denarius of Lucius Caesius, 112–111 BC. On the obverse is Apollo, as written on the monogram behind his head, who also wears the attributes of Vejovis, an obscure deity. The obverse depicts a group of statues representing the Lares Praestites, which was described by Ovid.

The Lex Ogulnia (300) gave patricians and plebeians more-or-less equal representation in the augural and pontifical colleges; other important priesthoods, such as the Quindecimviri ("The Fifteen"), and the epulones (Note: Established in 196 to take over the running of a growing number of ludi and festivals from the pontifices) were opened to any member of the senatorial class. To restrain the accumulation and potential abuse of priestly powers, each gens was permitted one priesthood at a time, and the censors monitored the senators' religious activities. Magistrates who held an augurate could claim divine authority for their position and policies. (Note: Rosenberger 2007, p. 299. Auctoritas ('authority') is etymologically linked to augur: See Cornell 1995, p. 341) In the late Republic, augury came under the control of the pontifices, whose powers were increasingly woven into the civil and military cursus honorum. Eventually, the office of pontifex maximus became a de facto consular prerogative.

Some cults may have been exclusively female; for example, the rites of the Good Goddess (Bona Dea). Towards the end of the second Punic War, Rome rewarded priestesses of Demeter from Graeca Magna with Roman citizenship for training respectable, leading matrons as sacerdotes of "Greek rites" to Ceres. Every matron of a family (the wife of its pater familias) had a religious duty to maintain the household fire, which was considered an extension of Vesta's sacred fire, tended in perpetuity by the chaste Vestal Virgins. The Vestals also made the sacrificial mola salsa employed in many State rituals, and represent an essential link between domestic and state religion. Rome's survival was thought to depend on their sacred status and ritual purity.

=== Temples and festivals ===
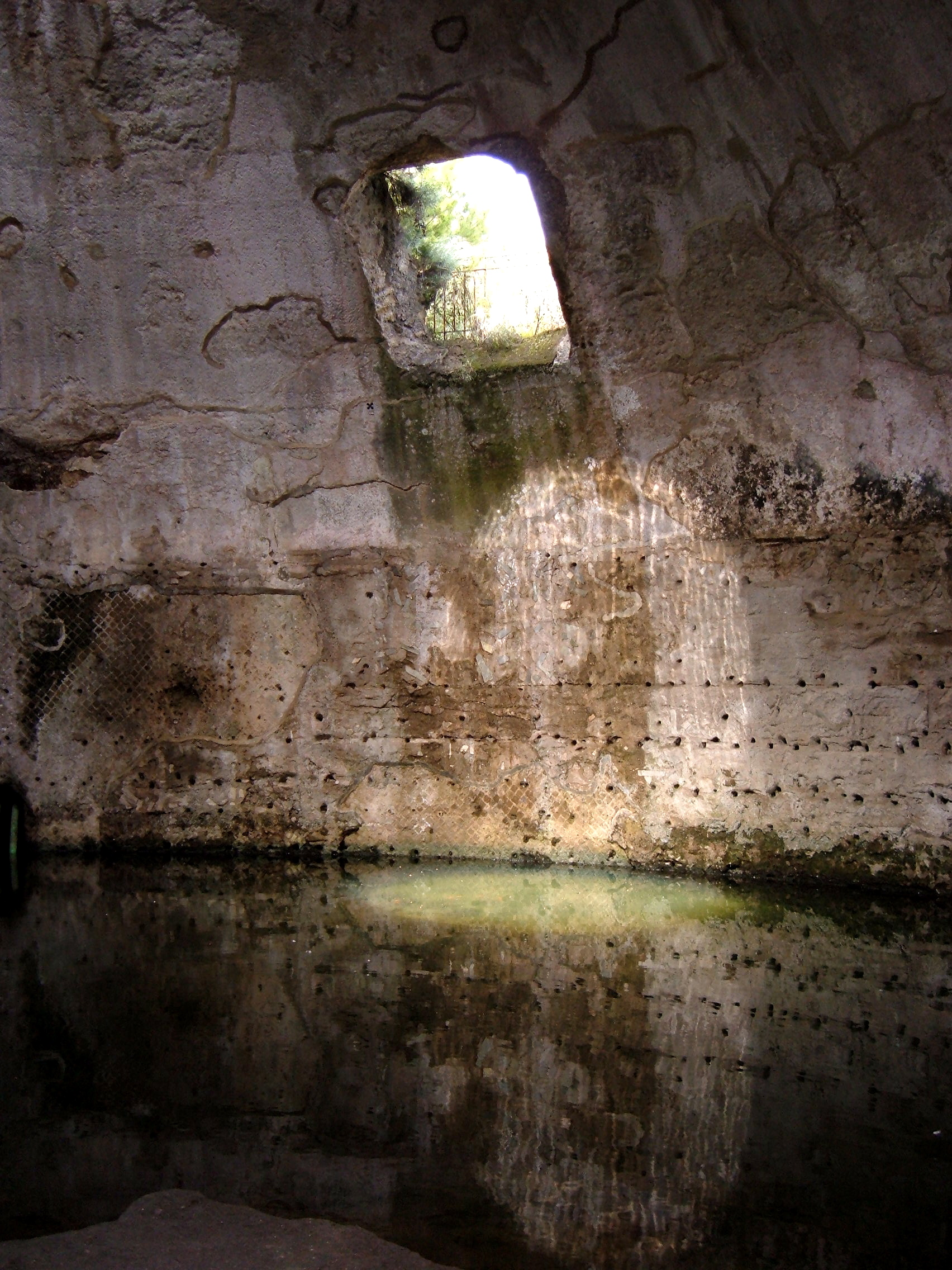
Inside the "Temple of Mercury" at Baiae, a swimming pool for a Roman bath, built during the late Roman Republic, and containing one of the largest domes in the world before the building of the Pantheon

Rome's major public temples were within the city's sacred, augural boundary (pomerium), which had supposedly been marked out by Romulus, with Jupiter's approval. The Temple of Jupiter Optimus Maximus ("Jupiter, Best and Greatest") stood on the Capitoline Hill. Among the settled areas outside the pomerium was the nearby Aventine Hill. It was traditionally associated with Romulus's unfortunate twin, Remus, and in later history with the Latins, and the Roman plebs. The Aventine seems to have functioned as a place for the introduction of "foreign" deities. In 392, Camillus established a temple there to Juno Regina, Etruscan Veii's protective goddess. Later introductions include Summanus, c. 278, Vortumnus c. 264, and at some time before the end of the 3rd century, Minerva. (Note: For Camillus and Juno, see Benko 2004, p. 27) While Ceres's Aventine temple was most likely built at patrician expense, to mollify the plebs, the patricians brought the Magna Mater ("Great mother of the Gods") to Rome as their own "Trojan" ancestral goddess, and installed her on the Palatine.

Romulus was said to have pitched his augural tent atop the Palatine. Beneath its southern slopes ran the sacred way, next to the former palace of the kings (Regia), the House of the Vestals and Temple of Vesta. Close by were the Lupercal shrine and the cave where Romulus and Remus were said to have been suckled by the she-wolf. On the flat area between the Aventine and Palatine was the Circus Maximus, which hosted chariot races and religious games. Its several shrines and temples included those to Rome's indigenous sun god, Sol, the moon-goddess Luna, the grain-storage god, Consus, and the obscure goddess Murcia.

Whereas Romans marked the passage of years with the names of their ruling consuls, their calendars marked the anniversaries of religious foundations to particular deities, the days when official business was permitted (fas), and those when it was not (nefas). The Romans observed an eight-day week; law courts were closed and markets were held on the ninth day. Each month was presided over by a particular, usually major deity. The oldest calendars were lunar.

=== In the military ===
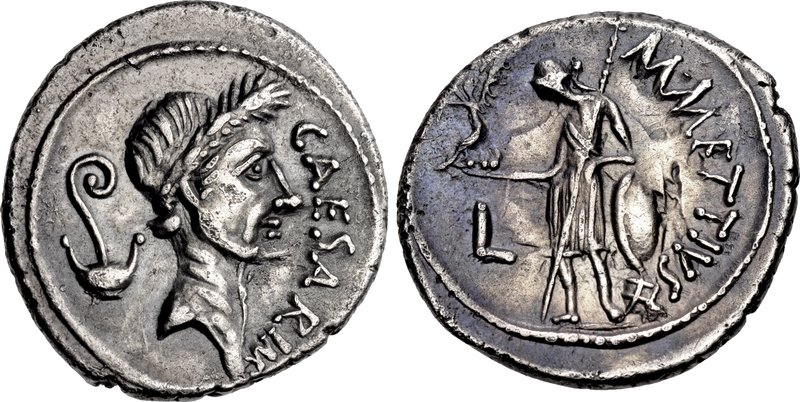
Denarius of Caesar, minted just before his murder, in 44 BC. It was the first Roman coin bearing the portrait of a living person.

Before any campaign or battle, Roman commanders took auspices, or haruspices, to seek the gods' opinion regarding the likely outcome. Military success was achieved through a combination of personal and collective virtus (roughly, "manly virtue") and divine will. Triumphal generals dressed as Jupiter Capitolinus and laid their victor's laurels at his feet. Religious negligence, or lack of virtus, provoked divine wrath and led to military disaster. Military oaths dedicated the oath-takers life to Rome's gods and people; defeated soldiers were expected to take their own lives, rather than survive as captives. Examples of devotio, as performed by the Decii Mures, in which soldiers offered and gave their lives to the Di inferi (gods of the underworld) in exchange for Roman victory were celebrated as the highest good.

== Cities, towns and villas ==
=== City of Rome ===
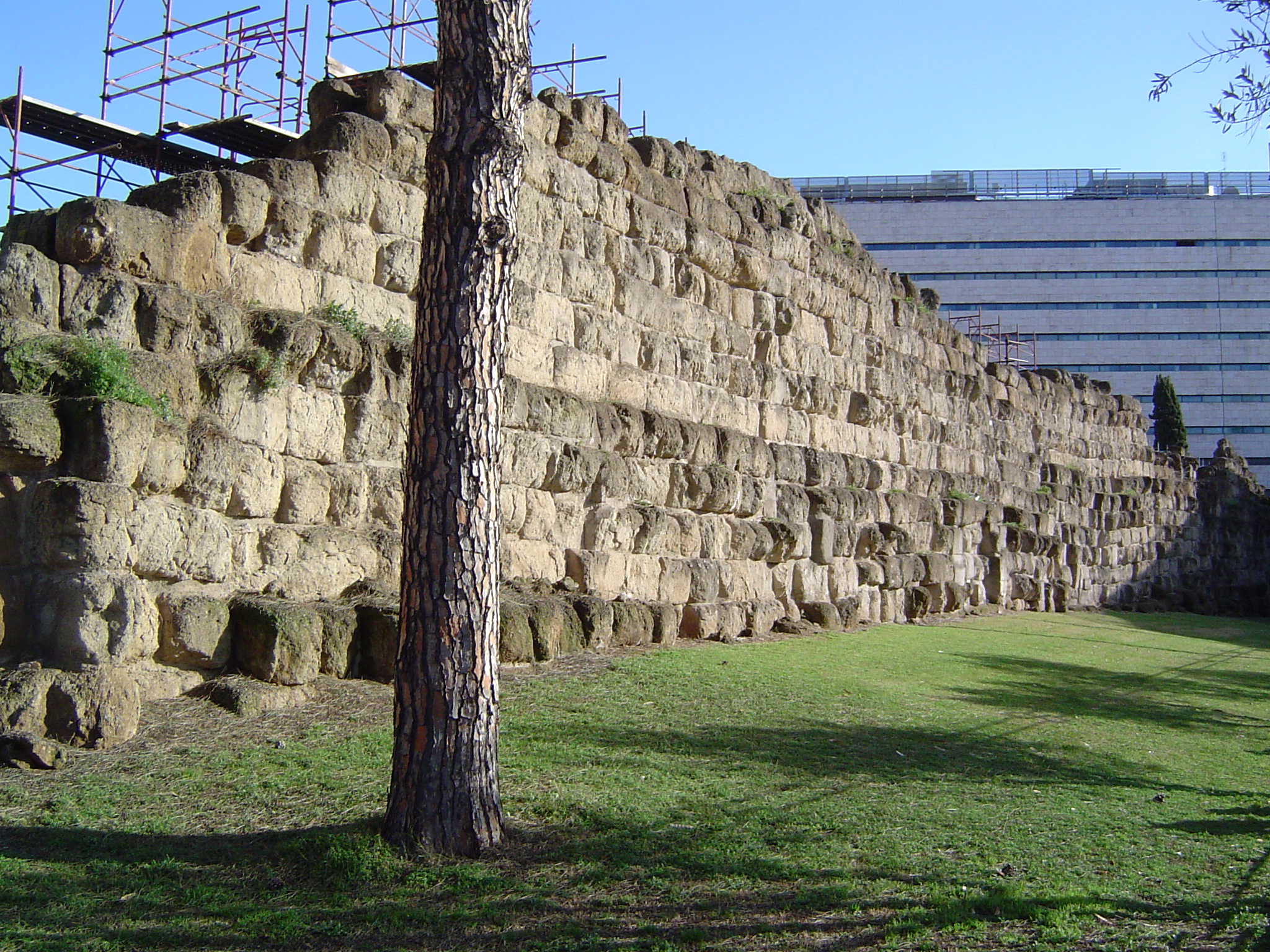
The ruins of the Servian Wall, built during the 4th century BC, one of the earliest ancient Roman defensive walls

Life in the Roman Republic revolved around the city of Rome. The most important governing, administrative and religious institutions were concentrated at its heart, on and around the Capitoline and Palatine Hills. The city rapidly outgrew its original sacred boundary (pomerium), and its first city walls. Rome's first aqueduct (312), built during the Punic wars crisis, provided a plentiful, clean water supply. The building of further aqueducts led to the city's expansion and the establishment of public baths (thermae) as a central feature of Roman culture. (Note: For the earliest likely development of Roman public bathing, see Fagan 1999, pp. 42–44) The city also had several theatres, gymnasiums, and many taverns and brothels. Living space was at a premium. Some ordinary citizens and freedmen of middling income might live in modest houses but most of the population lived in apartment blocks (insulae, literally "islands"), where the better-off might rent an entire ground floor, and the poorest a single, possibly windowless room at the top, with few or no amenities. Nobles and rich patrons lived in spacious, well-appointed town houses; they were expected to keep "open house" for their peers and clients. A semi-public atrium typically functioned as a meeting-space, and a vehicle for display of wealth, artistic taste, and religious piety. Noble atria were also display areas for ancestor-masks (imagines). (Note: "The architecture of the ancient Romans was, from first to last, an art of shaping space around ritual:" Lott 2004, p. 1, citing Brown 1961, p. 9. Some Roman ritual includes activities which might be called, in modern terms, religious; some is what might be understood in modern terms as secular – the proper and habitual way of doing things. For Romans, both activities were matters of lawful custom (mos maiorum) rather than religious as opposed to secular.)

Most Roman towns and cities had a forum and temples, as did the city of Rome itself. Aqueducts brought water to urban centres. Landlords generally resided in cities and left their estates in the care of farm managers.

== Culture ==
=== Clothing ===
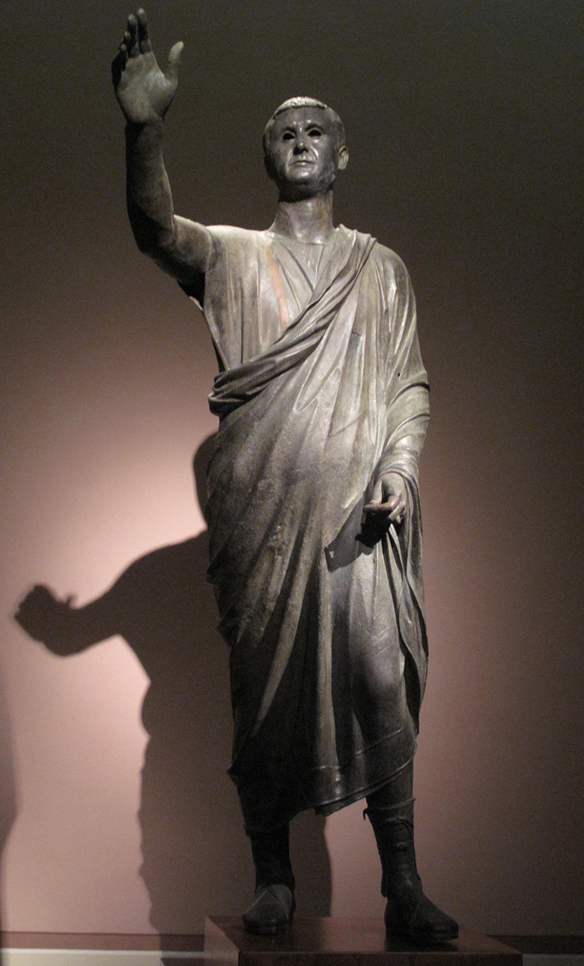
The Orator, c. 100 BC, an Etrusco-Roman statue of a Republican senator, wearing toga praetexta and senatorial shoes; compared to the voluminous, costly, impractical togas of the Imperial era, the Republican-era type is frugal and "skimpy" (exigua).

The basic Roman garment was the Greek-style tunic, worn knee-length and short-sleeved (or sleeveless) for men and boys, and ankle-length and long-sleeved for women and girls. The toga was distinctively Roman and became a mark of male citizenship, a statement of social degree. Convention also dictated the type, colour and style of calcei (ankle-boots) appropriate to each level of male citizenship.

The whitest, most voluminous togas were worn by the senatorial class. High-ranking magistrates, priests, and citizen's children were entitled to a purple-bordered toga praetexta. Triumphal generals wore an all-purple, gold-embroidered toga picta, associated with the image of Jupiter and Rome's former kings – but only for a single day; Republican mores simultaneously fostered competitive display and attempted its containment, to preserve at least a notional equality between peers and reduce the potential threats of class envy. Most Roman citizens, particularly the lower class of plebs, opted for more comfortable and practical garments, such as tunics and cloaks.

Luxurious and highly coloured clothing had always been available to those who could afford it, particularly women of the leisured classes. There is material evidence for cloth-of-gold (lamé) as early as the 7th century. By the 3rd century, significant quantities of raw silk were being imported from Han China. Tyrian purple, a quasi-sacred colour, was officially reserved for the border of the toga praetexta and for the solid purple toga picta.

For most Romans, even the cheapest linen or woolen clothing represented a major expense. Worn clothing was passed down the social scale until it fell to rags, and these were used for patchwork. Wool and linen were the mainstays of Roman clothing, idealised by moralists as simple and frugal. For most women, the preparation and weaving of wool were part of daily housekeeping, either for family use or for sale. In traditionalist, wealthy households, the family's spindles and looms were positioned in the semi-public reception area (atrium), so the mater familias and her familia could demonstrate their industry and frugality: a largely symbolic and moral activity for those of their class, rather than practical necessity. (Note: In reality, she was the female equivalent of the romanticised citizen-farmer: see Flower 2004, pp. 153, 195–197)

As the Republic wore on, its trade, territories and wealth increased. Roman conservatives deplored the apparent erosion of traditional, class-based dress distinctions, and an increasing Roman appetite for luxurious fabrics and exotic "foreign" styles among all classes, including their own. Towards the end of the Republic, the ultra-traditionalist Cato the Younger publicly protested the self-indulgence of his peers, and the loss of Republican "manly virtues", by wearing a "skimpy" dark woolen toga, without tunic or footwear. (Note: Appian's history of Rome finds its strife-torn Late Republic tottering at the edge of chaos; most seem to dress as they like, not as they ought: "For now the Roman people are much mixed with foreigners, there is equal citizenship for freedmen, and slaves dress like their masters. With the exception of the Senators, free citizens and slaves wear the same costume." See Rothfus 2010, p. 1)

=== Food and dining ===
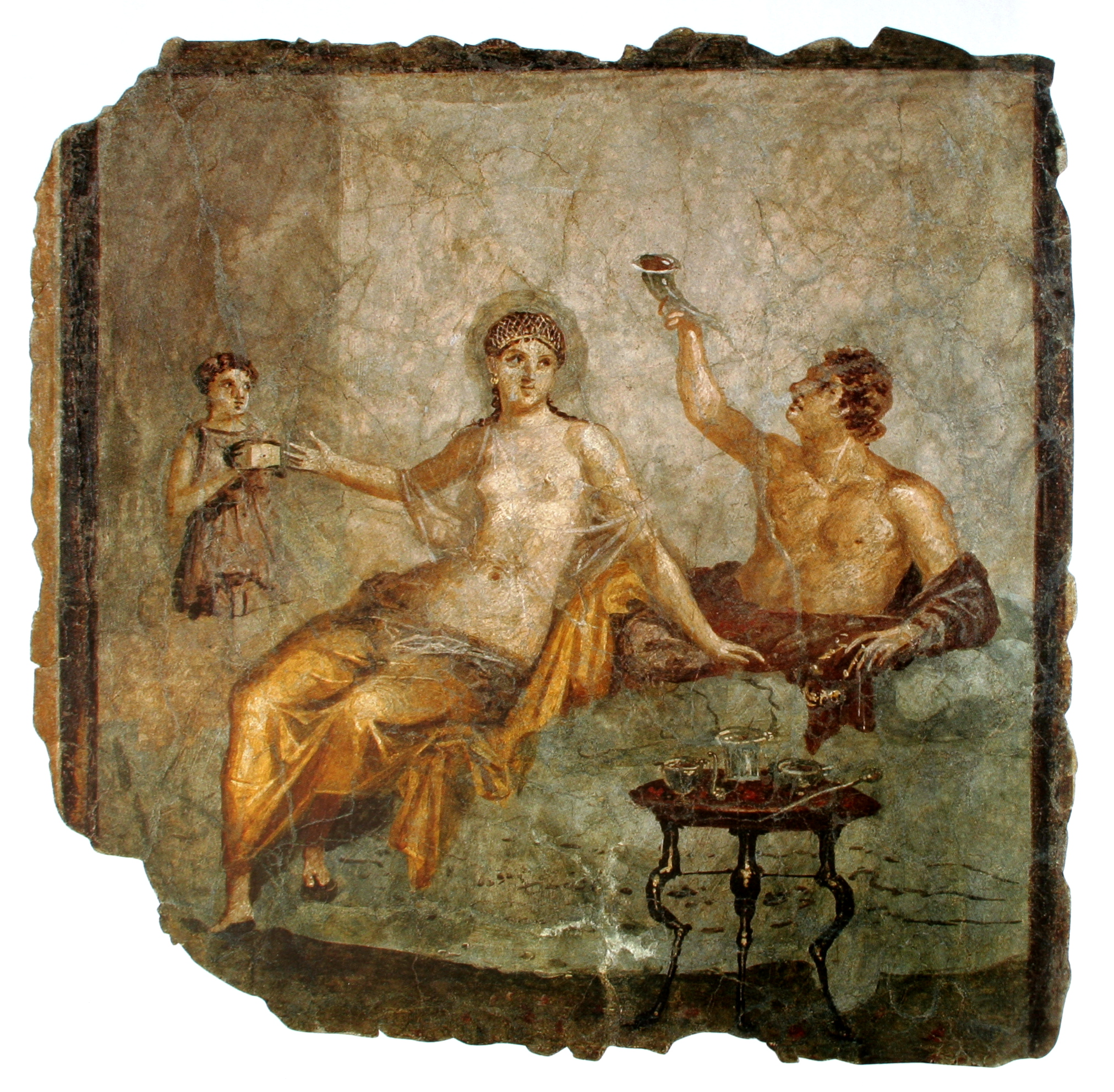
Banquet scene, fresco, Herculaneum, Italy, c. 50 BC

Modern study of the dietary habits during the Republic are hampered by various factors. Few writings have survived, and because different components of their diet are more or less likely to be preserved, the archaeological record cannot be relied on. In the early Republic, the main meal (cena) essentially consisted of a kind of porridge, the puls. The simplest kind would be made from emmer, water, salt and fat. The wealthy commonly ate their puls with eggs, cheese, and honey, and it was also occasionally served with meat or fish. Over the course of the Republican period, the cena developed into two courses: the main course and a dessert with fruit and seafood (e.g. molluscs or shrimp). By the late Republic, it was usual for the meal to be served in three parts: an appetiser (gustatio), main course (primae mensae), and dessert (secundae mensae).

During the mid-to-later Republic, wine was increasingly treated as a necessity rather than a luxury. In ancient Rome, wine was normally mixed with water immediately before drinking, since the fermentation was not controlled and the alcohol proof was high. Sour wine mixed with water and herbs (posca) was a popular drink for the lower classes and a staple part of the Roman soldier's ration. Beer (cerevisia) was known but considered vulgar, and was associated with barbarians.

From 123 BC, a ration of unmilled wheat (as much as 33 kg), known as the frumentatio, was distributed to as many as 200,000 people every month by the Roman state.

=== Education and language ===
Rome's original native language was early Latin, the language of the Italic Latins. Most surviving Latin literature is written in Classical Latin, a highly stylised and polished literary language which developed from early and vernacular spoken Latin, from the 1st century. Most Latin speakers used Vulgar Latin, which significantly differed from Classical Latin in grammar, vocabulary, and eventually pronunciation.

Following various military conquests in the Greek East, Romans adapted a number of Greek educational precepts to their own fledgling system. Strenuous, disciplined physical training helped prepare boys of citizen class for their eventual citizenship and a military career. Girls generally received instruction from their mothers in the art of spinning, weaving, and sewing. Schooling of a more formal sort began around 200. Education began at the age of around six, and in the next six to seven years, boys and girls were expected to learn reading, writing and counting. By the age of twelve, they would be learning Latin, Greek, grammar and literature, followed by training for public speaking. Effective oratory and good Latin were highly valued among the elite, and were essential to a career in law or politics.

=== Arts ===
In the 3rd century, Greek art taken as the spoils of war became popular, and many Roman homes were decorated with landscapes by Greek artists.

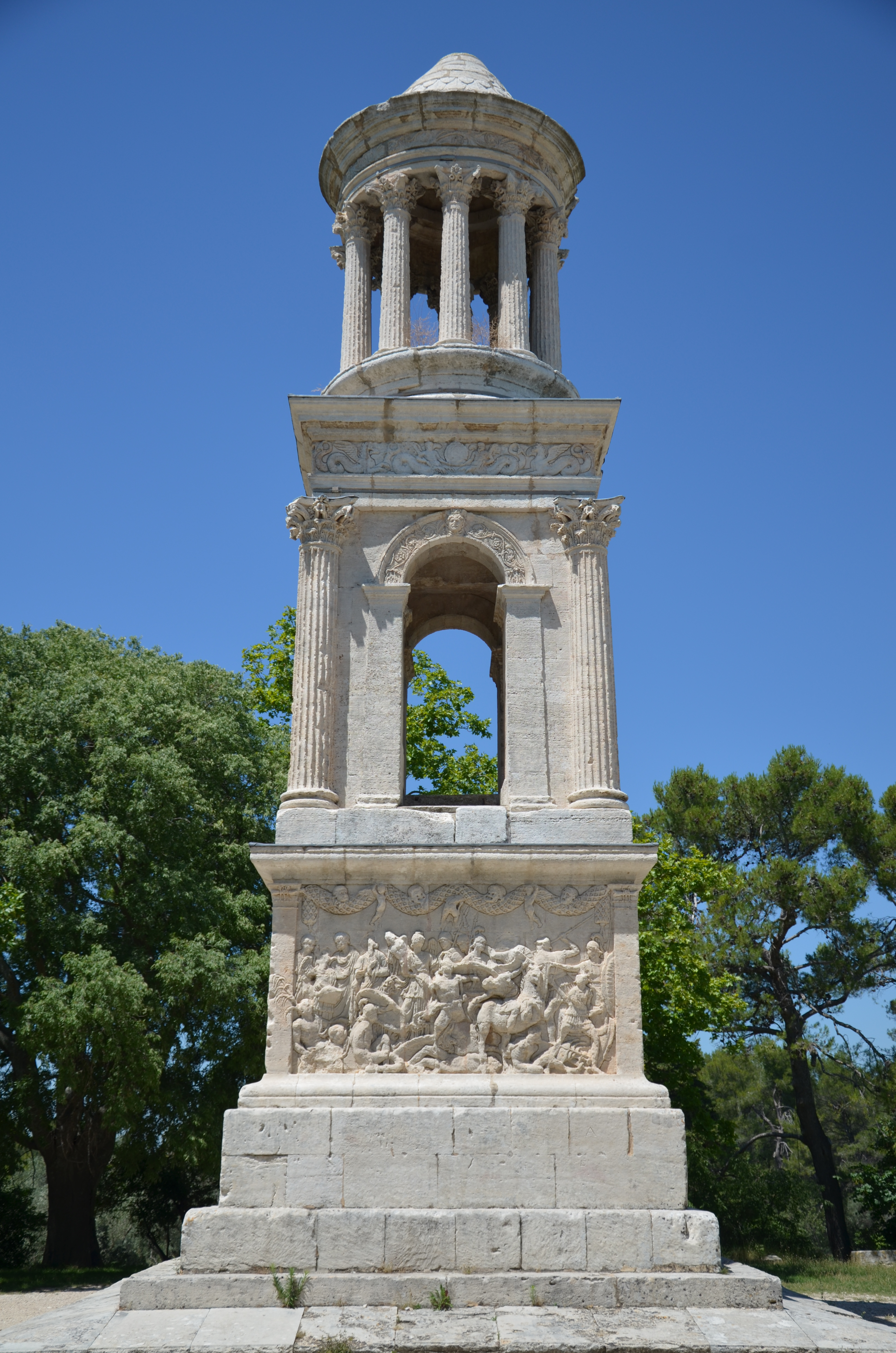
The Mausoleum of Glanum in Saint-Rémy-de-Provence, France, erected circa 40 BC during the Second Triumvirate

Over time, Roman architecture was modified as their urban requirements changed, and the civil engineering and building construction technology became developed and refined. Factors such as wealth and high population densities in cities forced the ancient Romans to discover new architectural solutions of their own. The use of vaults and arches, together with a sound knowledge of building materials, enabled them to achieve unprecedented successes in the construction of imposing infrastructure for public use. These were reproduced at a smaller scale in the most important towns and cities in the Roman Republic. The administrative structure and wealth of the Empire made possible very large projects even in locations remote from the main centres.

=== Literature ===
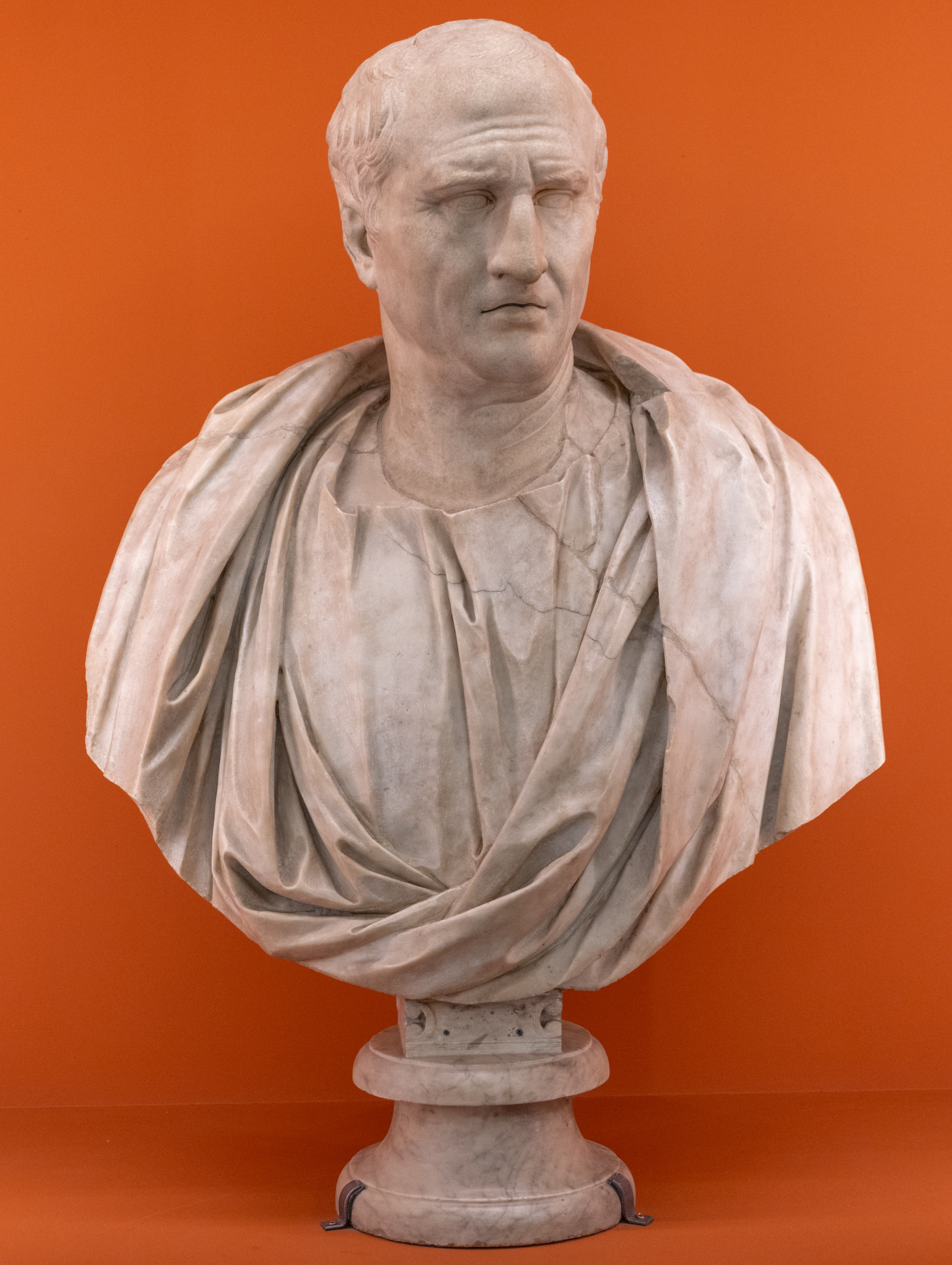
Marble bust of Marcus Tullius Cicero, Musei Capitolini, Rome

Early Roman literature was influenced heavily by Greek authors. From the mid-Republic, Roman authors followed Greek models, to produce free-verse and verse-form plays and other in Latin; for example, Livius Andronicus wrote tragedies and comedies. The earliest Latin works to have survived intact are the comedies of Plautus, written during the mid-Republic. Works of well-known, popular playwrights were sometimes commissioned for performance at religious festivals; many of these were satyr plays, based on Greek models and Greek myths. The poet Naevius may be said to have written the first Roman epic poem, although Ennius was the first Roman poet to write an epic in an adapted Latin hexameter. However, only fragments of Ennius' epic, the Annales, have survived, yet both Naevius and Ennius influenced later Latin epic, especially Virgil's Aeneid. Lucretius, in his On the Nature of Things, explicated the tenets of Epicurean philosophy.

The politician, poet and philosopher Cicero's literary output was remarkably prolific and so influential on contemporary and later literature that the period from 83 to 43 BC has been called the "Age of Cicero". His oratory continues to influence modern speakers, while his philosophical works, particularly Cicero's Latin adaptations of Greek Platonic and Epicurean works, influenced many later philosophers. Other prominent writers of this period include the grammarian and historian of religion Varro, the politician, general and military commentator Julius Caesar, the historian Sallust and the love poet Catullus.

=== Sports and entertainment ===
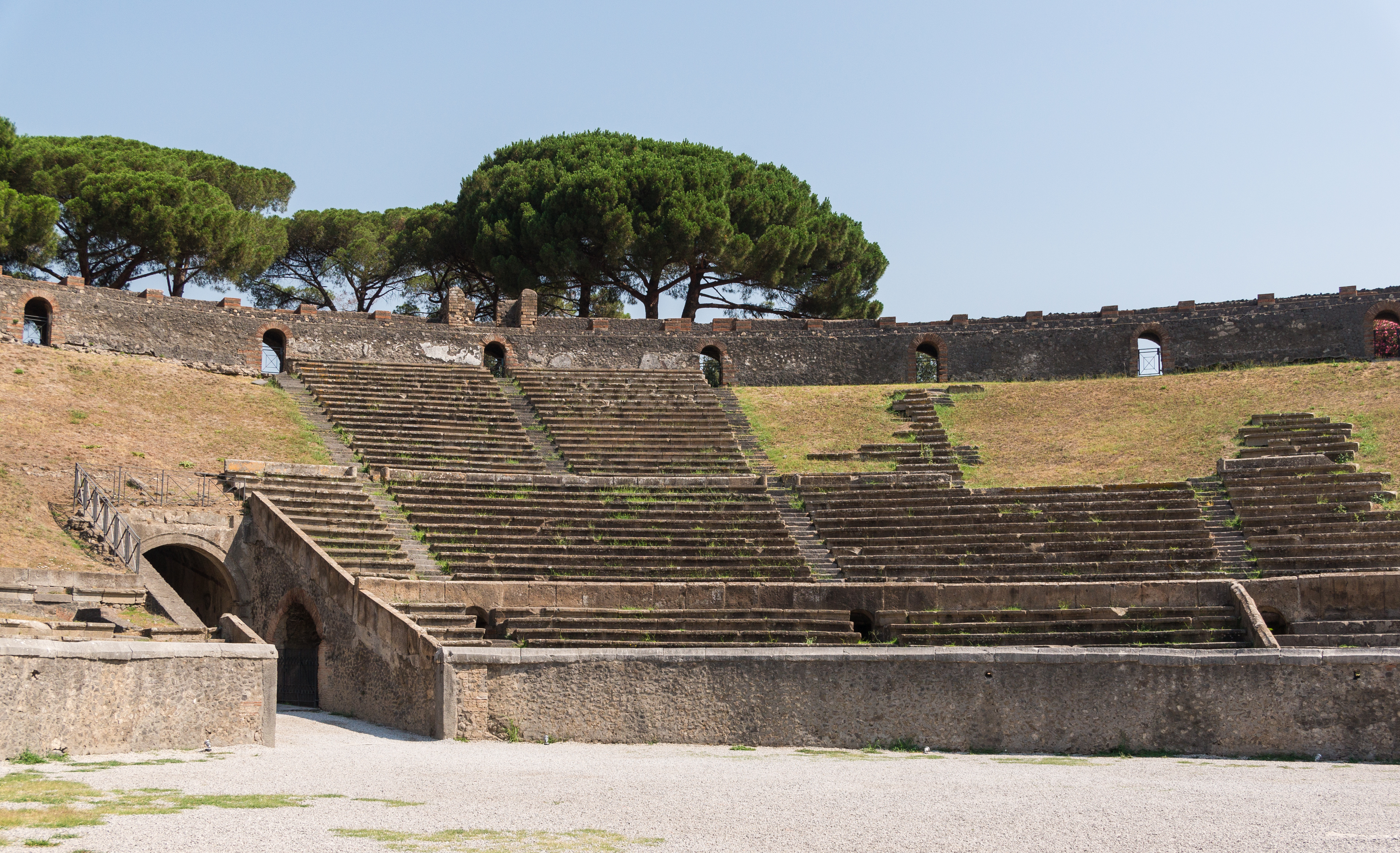
The Amphitheatre of Pompeii, built around 70 BC and buried by the eruption of Mount Vesuvius 79 AD, once hosted spectacles with gladiators.

The Campus Martius was Rome's track and field playground, where youth assembled to play and exercise, which included jumping, wrestling, boxing and racing. Equestrian sports, throwing, and swimming were also preferred physical activities. In the countryside, pastimes included fishing and hunting. Board games played in Rome included dice (Tesserae or Tali), Roman chess (Latrunculi), Roman checkers (Calculi), Tic-tac-toe (Terni Lapilli), and Ludus duodecim scriptorum and Tabula, predecessors of backgammon. Other activities included chariot races, and musical and theatrical performances.

== See also ==
- History of the Roman Empire
- Roman commerce – Major sector of the Roman economy
- Roman conceptions of citizenship
- Roman economy – Economy of ancient Rome
- Crisis of the Roman Republic

== Notes ==
Preceded by Roman Kingdom	Roman Republic; 509 BC – 27 BC	Succeeded by Julio-Claudian dynasty Roman Empire
