= History of the Roman Constitution =

The History of the Roman Constitution is a study of ancient Rome that traces the progression of Roman political development from the founding of the city of Rome in 753 BC to the collapse of the Western Roman Empire in 476 AD. The constitution of the Roman Kingdom vested the sovereign power in the King of Rome. The king did have two rudimentary checks on his authority, which took the form of a board of elders (the Roman Senate) and a popular assembly (the Curiate Assembly). The arrangement was similar to the constitutional arrangements found in contemporary Greek city-states (such as Athens or Sparta). These Greek constitutional principles probably came to Rome through the Greek colonies of Magna Graecia in southern Italy. The Roman Kingdom was overthrown in 510 BC, according to legend, and in its place the Roman Republic was founded.

The constitutional history of the Roman Republic can be divided into five phases. The first phase began with the revolution which overthrew the Roman Kingdom in 510 BC, and the final phase ended with the revolution which overthrew the Roman Republic, and thus created the Roman Empire, in 27 BC. Throughout the history of the republic, the constitutional evolution was driven by the struggle between the aristocracy (the "Patricians") and the ordinary citizens (the "Plebeians"). Approximately two centuries after the founding of the republic, the Plebeians attained, in theory at least, equality with the Patricians. In practice, however, the plight of the average Plebeian remained unchanged. This set the stage for the civil wars of the 1st century BC, and Rome's transformation into a formal empire.

The general who won the last civil war of the Roman Republic, Gaius Octavian, became the master of the state. In the years after 30 BC, Octavian set out to reform the Roman constitution, and to found the Principate. The ultimate consequence of these reforms was the abolition of the republic, and the founding of the Roman Empire. Octavian was given the honorific Augustus ("venerable") by the Roman Senate, and became known to history by this name, and as the first Roman Emperor. Octavian's reforms did not, at the time, seem drastic, since they did nothing more than reorganize the constitution. The reorganization was revolutionary, however, because the ultimate result was that Octavian ended up with control over the entire constitution, which itself set the stage for outright monarchy. When Diocletian became Roman Emperor in 284, the Principate was abolished, and a new system, the Dominate, was established. This system survived until the ultimate fall of the Eastern Roman (Byzantine) Empire in 1453.

== Under the Kingdom ==
The period of the kingdom can be divided into two epochs based on the legends, handed down to us principally in the first book of Livy's Ab urbe condita ("From the City Having Been Founded", or simply "History of Rome"). While the specific legends were probably not true, they were likely based on historical fact. It is likely that, before the founding of the republic, Rome actually had been ruled by a succession of kings. The first legendary epoch saw the reigns of the first four legendary kings. During this time, the political foundations of the city were laid, the city grew increasingly organized, the religious institutions were established, and the senate and the assemblies evolved into formal institutions. The early Romans were divided into three ethnic groups. The families that belonged to one of these ethnic groups were the original Patrician families. In an attempt to add a level of organization to the city, these Patrician families were divided into units called curia. The vehicle through which the early Romans expressed their democratic impulses was known as a "committee" (comitia or "assembly"). The two principle assemblies that formed were known as the Curiate Assembly and the Calculate Assembly. The two assemblies were designed to mirror the ethnic divisions of the city, and as such, the assemblies were organized by curia. The vehicle through which the early Romans expressed their aristocratic impulses was a council of town elders, which became the Roman senate. The elders of this council were known as patres ("fathers"), and thus are known to history as the first Roman senators. The demos ("people") and the elders eventually recognized the need for a single political leader, and thus elected such a leader, the rex (Roman King). The demos elected the rex, and the elders advised the rex.

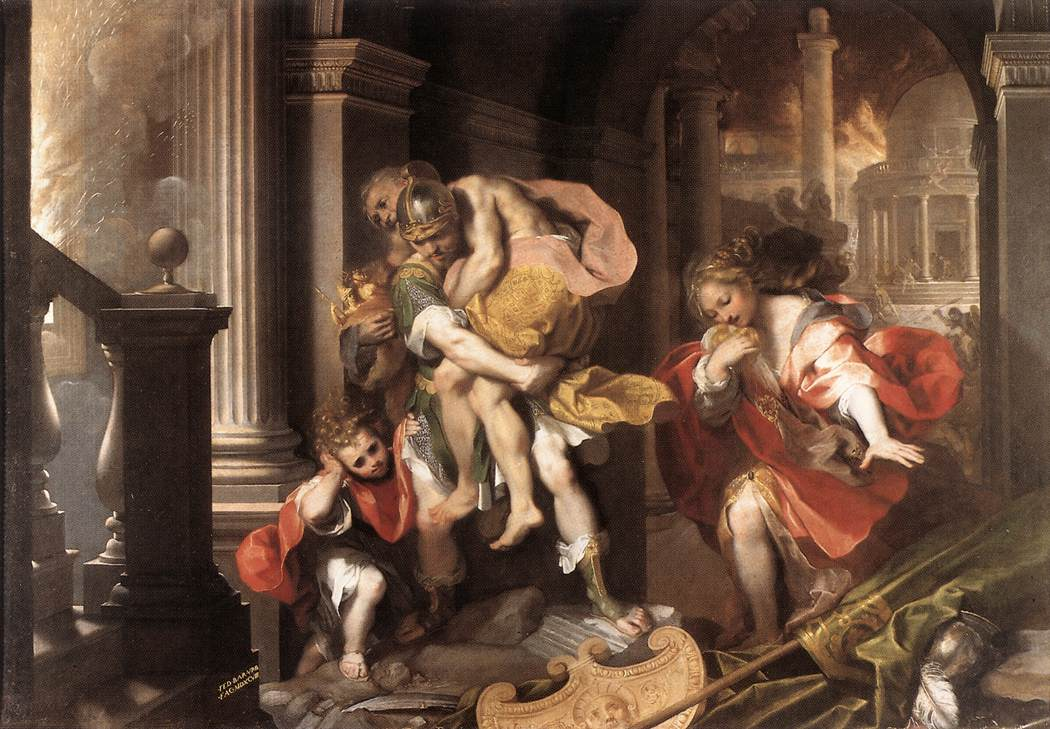
Aeneas, whom the Romans believed Romulus and Remus descended from, fleeing from the burning city of Troy

The second epoch saw the reigns of the last three legendary kings. The second epoch was more consequential than was the first, which was in part due to the significant degree of territorial expansion which occurred during this period. Regardless of how true these legends were, it is likely that, as the legends suggest, a series of conquests did occur during the late monarchy. As a result of these conquests, it became necessary to determine what was to be done with the conquered people. Often, individuals whose towns had been conquered remained in those towns, while other such individuals came to Rome. To acquire legal and economic standing, these newcomers adopted a condition of dependency toward either a Patrician family, or toward the king. Eventually, the individuals who were dependents of the king were released from their state of dependency, and became the first Plebeians. As Rome grew, it needed more soldiers to continue its conquests. When the Plebeians were released from their dependency, they were released from their Curia. When this occurred, while they were no longer required to serve in the army, they also lost their political and economic standing. To bring these new Plebeians back into the army, the Patricians were forced to make concessions. While it is not known exactly what concessions were made, the fact that they were not granted any political power set the stage for what history knows as the Conflict of the Orders.

The reign of the first four kings was distinct from that of the last three kings. The first kings were elected. Between the reigns of the final three kings, however, the monarchy became hereditary, and as such, the senate became subordinated to the king. This breach in the senate's sovereignty, rather than an intolerable tyranny, was probably what led the Patricians in the senate to overthrow the last king. The king may have sought the support of the Plebeians; however, the Plebeians were no doubt exhausted from their continued military service, and from their forced labor in the construction of public works. They were probably also embittered by their lack of political power, and therefore did not come to the aide of either the king or the senate.

== Under the Republic ==
After the monarchy had been overthrown, and the Roman Republic had been founded, the people of Rome began electing two Consuls each year. In the year 494 BC, the Plebeians (commoners) seceded to the Aventine Hill, and demanded of the Patricians (the aristocrats) the right to elect their own officials. The Patricians duly capitulated, and the Plebeians ended their secession. The Plebeians called these new officials Plebeian Tribunes, and gave these Tribunes two assistants, called Plebeian Aediles.

In 449 BC, the Senate promulgated the Twelve Tables as the centerpiece of the Roman Constitution. In 443 BC, the office of Censor was created, and in 367 BC, Plebeians were allowed to stand for the Consulship. The opening of the Consulship to the Plebeian class implicitly opened both the Censorship as well as the Dictatorship to Plebeians. In 366 BC, in an effort by the Patricians to reassert their influence over the magisterial offices, two new offices were created. While these two offices, the Praetorship and the Curule Aedileship, were at first open only to Patricians, within a generation, they were open to Plebeians as well.

Beginning around the year 350 BC, the senators and the Plebeian Tribunes began to grow closer. The Senate began giving Tribunes more power, and, unsurprisingly, the Tribunes began to feel indebted to the senate. As the Tribunes and the senators grew closer, Plebeian senators began to routinely secure the office of Tribune for members of their own families. Also around the year 350 BC, the Plebeian Council (popular assembly) enacted a significant law (the "Ovinian Law") which transferred, from the Consuls to the Censors, the power to appoint new senators. This law also required the Censors to appoint any newly elected magistrate to the Senate, which probably resulted in a significant increase in the number of Plebeian senators. This, along with the closeness between the Plebeian Tribunes and the Senate, helped to facilitate the creation of a new Plebeian aristocracy. This new Plebeian aristocracy soon merged with the old Patrician aristocracy, creating a combined "Patricio-Plebeian" aristocracy. The old aristocracy existed through the force of law, because only Patricians had been allowed to stand for high office. Now, however, the new aristocracy existed due to the organization of society, and as such, this order could only be overthrown through a revolution.

In 287 BC, the Plebeians seceded to the Janiculum hill. To end the secession, a law (the "Hortensian Law") was passed, which ended the requirement that the Patrician senators consent before a bill could be brought before the Plebeian Council for a vote. The ultimate significance of this law was in the fact that it robbed the Patricians of their final weapon over the Plebeians. The result was that the ultimate control over the state fell, not onto the shoulders of democracy, but onto the shoulders of the new Patricio-Plebeian aristocracy. By the middle of the second century BC, the economic situation for the average Plebeian had declined significantly. Farmers became bankrupted, and soon masses of unemployed Plebeians began flooding into Rome, and thus into the ranks of the legislative assemblies, where their economic status usually led them to vote for the candidate who offered them the most. A new culture of dependency was emerging, which would look to any populist leader for relief.

Cornelia, mother of the future Gracchi tribunes, pointing to her children as her treasures

In 88 BC, an aristocratic senator named Lucius Cornelius Sulla was elected Consul, and soon left for a war in the east. When a Tribune revoked Sulla's command of the war, Sulla brought his army back to Italy, marched on Rome, secured the city, and left for the east again. In 83 BC he returned to Rome, and captured the city a second time. In 82 BC, he made himself Dictator, and then used his status as Dictator to pass a series of constitutional reforms that were intended to strengthen the senate. In 80 BC he resigned his Dictatorship, and by 78 BC he was dead. While he thought that he had firmly established aristocratic rule, his own career had illustrated the fatal weakness in the constitution: that it was the army, and not the senate, which dictated the fortunes of the state. In 70 BC, the generals Pompey Magnus and Marcus Licinius Crassus were both elected Consul, and quickly dismantled Sulla's constitution. In 62 BC Pompey returned to Rome from battle in the east, and soon entered into an agreement with Julius Caesar. Caesar and Pompey, along with Crassus, established a private agreement, known as the First Triumvirate. Under the agreement, Pompey's arrangements were to be ratified, Crassus was to be promised a future Consulship, and Caesar was to be promised the Consulship in 59 BC, and then the governorship of Gaul (modern France) immediately afterwards. In 54 BC, violence began sweeping the city, and in 53 BC Crassus was killed. In January 49 BC, the senate passed a resolution which declared that if Caesar did not lay down his arms by July of that year, he would be considered an enemy of the republic. In response, Caesar quickly crossed the Rubicon with his veteran army, and marched towards Rome. Caesar's rapid advance forced Pompey, the Consuls and the senate to abandon Rome for Greece, and allowed Caesar to enter the city unopposed.

By 48 BC, after having defeated the last of his major enemies, Julius Caesar wanted to ensure that his control over the government was undisputed. He assumed these powers by increasing his own authority, and by decreasing the authority of Rome's other political institutions. Caesar held the office of Roman Dictator, and alternated between the Consulship (the chief-magistracy) and the Proconsulship (in effect, a military governorship). In 48 BC, Caesar was given the powers of a Plebeian Tribune, which made his person sacrosanct, gave him the power to veto the Senate, and allowed him to dominate the legislative process. After Caesar was assassinated in 44 BC, Mark Antony formed an alliance with Caesar's adopted son and great-nephew, Gaius Octavian. Along with Marcus Aemilius Lepidus, they formed an alliance known as the Second Triumvirate, and held powers that were nearly identical to the powers that Caesar had held under his constitution. While the conspirators who had assassinated Caesar were defeated at the Battle of Philippi in 42 BC, the peace that resulted was only temporary. Antony and Octavian fought against each other in one last battle in 31 BC. Antony was defeated, and in 30 BC he committed suicide. In 29 BC, Octavian returned to Rome as the unchallenged master of the state. The reign of Octavian, whom history remembers as Augustus, the first Roman Emperor, marked the dividing line between the Roman Republic and the Roman Empire. By the time this process was complete, Rome had completed its transition from a city-state with a network of dependencies, to the capital of an empire.

== Under the Empire ==
When Octavian returned to Rome two years after defeating Mark Antony, no one remained to oppose him. Decades of war had taken a terrible toll on the People of Rome. The political situation was unstable, and there was a constant threat of renewed warfare. Octavian's arrival alone caused a wave of optimism to ripple throughout Italy. As soon as he arrived, he began addressing the problems that were plaguing Rome. Octavian's popularity soon reached new heights, which ultimately gave him the support he needed to implement his reforms. When Octavian deposed Mark Antony in 32 BC, he resigned his position as triumvir, but was probably vested with powers similar to those that he had given up.

Octavian wanted to solidify his status as master of the state, but avoid the fate of his adopted father. On January 13 of 27 BC, Octavian transferred control of the state back to the Senate and the People of Rome, but neither the Senate nor the People of Rome were willing to accept what was, in effect, Octavian's resignation. Octavian was allowed to remain Roman Consul (the chief-executive under the old Republic), and was also allowed to retain his tribunician powers (similar to those of the Plebeian Tribunes, or chief representatives of the people). This arrangement, in effect, functioned as a popular ratification of his position within the state. The Senate then granted Octavian a unique grade of Proconsular command power (imperium) which gave him the authority over all of Rome's military governors, and thus, over the entire Roman army. Octavian was also granted the title of "Augustus" ("venerable") and of Princeps ("first citizen"). In 23 BC, Augustus (as Octavian now called himself) gave up his Consulship, and expanded both his Proconsular imperium and his tribunician powers. After these final reforms had been instituted, Augustus never again altered his constitution. Augustus' final goal was to ensure an orderly succession. In 6 BC Augustus granted tribunician powers to his stepson Tiberius, and quickly recognized Tiberius as his heir. In 13 AD a law was passed which made Tiberius' legal powers equivalent to, and independent from, those of Augustus. Within a year, Augustus was dead.

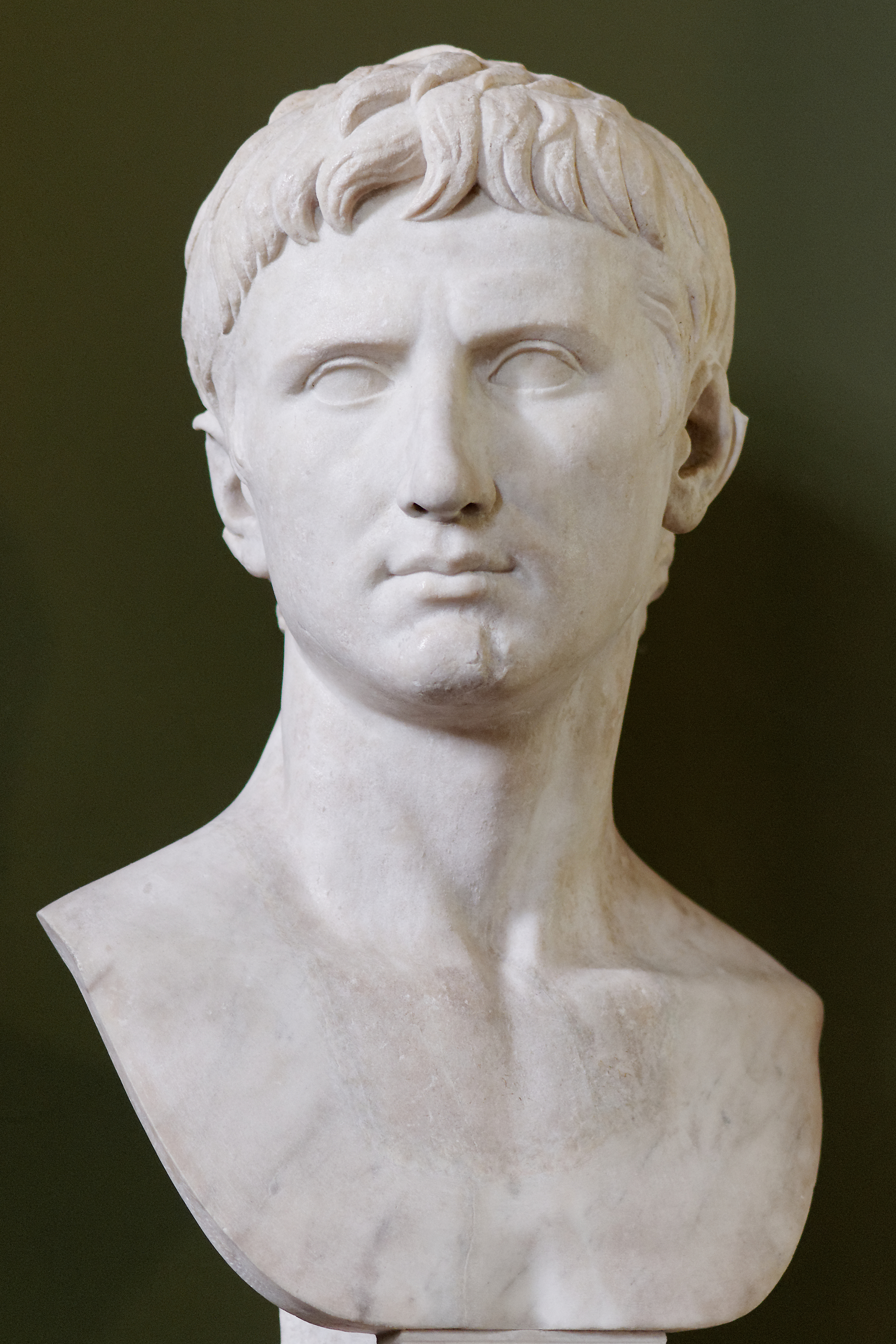
Augustus, the first Roman emperor

When Augustus died in 14 AD, the Principate legally ended. Tiberius knew that if he secured the support of the army, the rest of the government would soon follow. Therefore, Tiberius assumed command of the Praetorian Guard, and used his Proconsular imperium to force the armies to swear allegiance to him. As soon as this occurred, the Senate and the magistrates acquiesced. Under Tiberius, the power to elect magistrates was transferred from the assemblies to the Senate. When Tiberius died, Caligula was proclaimed Emperor by the Senate. In 41 Caligula was assassinated, and for two days following his assassination, the Senate debated the merits of restoring the Republic. Due to the demands of the army, however, Claudius was declared emperor, but he was ultimately killed, and Nero was declared Emperor.

In the decades after the death of Augustus, the Roman Empire was, in a sense, a union of inchoate principalities, which could have disintegrated at any time. In 68 AD, Ser. Sulpicius Galba, the governor of Hispania Tarraconensis, was proclaimed Emperor by his troops. In Rome, the emperor Nero quickly lost his supporters and committed suicide. The governor of Lower Germany, A. Vitellius, was soon proclaimed Emperor by his troops, and in Rome, the Praetorian Guard proclaimed M. Salvius Otho Emperor. In 69, Galba was assassinated and Otho took an army to Germany to defeat Vitellius, but instead was himself defeated. He committed suicide, and Vitellius was proclaimed Emperor, but was quickly defeated and then executed by Vespasian, who was then declared Emperor. Under the Emperor Vespasian, the Roman constitution began a slide toward outright monarchy. Vespasian died in 79, and was succeeded by his son, Titus, who presided over a further weakening of the senate. He was succeeded by his brother, Domitian, in 81. Domitian's reign marked a significant turning point on the road to monarchy, as he made himself Censor for life, and unlike his father, used these powers to further subjugate the Senate. Domitian, ultimately, was a tyrant with the character which always makes tyranny repulsive, and this derived in part from his own paranoia, which itself was a consequence of the fact that he had no son, and thus no obvious heir. In September 96, Domitian was assassinated.

During the period that began with the accession of the Emperor Nerva and ended with the death of the Emperor Commodus, the Empire continued to weaken. It was becoming difficult to recruit enough soldiers for the army, inflation was becoming an issue, and on at least one occasion, the Empire almost went bankrupt. The most significant constitutional development during this era was the steady drift towards monarchy. M. Cocceius Nerva succeeded Domitian, and although his reign was too short for any major constitutional reforms, he did reverse some of his predecessor's abuses. He was succeeded by Trajan in 98, who then went further than even Nerva had in restoring the image of a free republic, by, for example, allowing the senate to regain some independent legislative abilities. Hadrian succeeded Trajan as Emperor. By far, his most important constitutional alteration was his creation of a bureaucratic apparatus, which included a fixed gradation of clearly defined offices, and a corresponding order of promotion. Hadrian was succeeded by Antoninus Pius, who made no real changes to the constitution. Antoninus Pius was succeeded by Marcus Aurelius in 161. The most significant constitutional development that occurred during the reign of Marcus Aurelius was the revival of the republican principle of collegiality, as he made his brother, L. Aelius, his co-emperor. In 169, Aelius died, and in 176, Marcus Aurelius made his son, L. Aurelius Commodus, his new co-emperor. In 180, Marcus Aurelius died, and Commodus became Emperor. Commodus' tyranny revived the worst memories of the later Julian emperors, as he was more explicit than any of his predecessors in taking powers that he did not legally have, and in disregarding the constitution. He was killed in 192.

No further constitutional reforms were enacted during the Principate. The only development of any significance was the continuing slide towards monarchy, as the constitutional distinctions that had been set up by Augustus lost whatever meaning that they still had. Starting in 235, with the reign of the barbarian Emperor Maximinus Thrax, the Empire was put through a period of severe military, civil, and economic stress. The crisis arguably reached its height during the reign of Gallienus, from 260 to 268. The crisis ended with the accession of Diocletian in 284, and the abolishment of the Principate.

== Decline and fall ==
When Diocletian became Roman emperor in 284, the military situation had recently stabilized, which allowed him to enact badly needed constitutional reforms. Diocletian resurrected the "collegial" system that Marcus Aurelius had first used, and divided the empire into east and west. Each half was to be ruled by one of two co-emperors, called the Augusti. He then resurrected the precedent set by Hadrian, and ensured that each emperor named his successor early in his reign. Diocletian called that successor a Caesar. Diocletian then created a bureaucratic apparatus that was similar to the system that Hadrian had created, wherein each office had a defined set of responsibilities, a set rank, and a set path of promotion. In this administrative system, Diocletian followed the example that had been set by Domitian, and divided the Empire into small administrative units. He also assigned to the four tetrarchs (the two Augusti and the two Caesares) honorary titles and insignia that had been used by Domitian. One important consequence of these reforms was that the image of a free republic had finally given way, and the centuries-old reality of monarchy now became obvious.

When Diocletian resigned, chaos ensued, but after the chaos had subsided, most of his reforms remained in effect. While the Emperor Constantine the Great did enact some revisions to this constitution, the most significant change over the centuries was in the abolition of the Caesares. Ultimately this constitution survived, in one form or another, until the Western Roman Empire fell in 476. Diocletian's division of the Empire into west and east set the stage for ages to come, and was a significant factor behind the ultimate division of the Christian church into western Roman Catholic and eastern Greek Orthodox, while his division of the Empire into prefectures and dioceses is used by the Catholic Church to this day.

== See also ==
- Acta Senatus
- Byzantine Senate
- Centuria
- Cursus honorum
- Interrex
- Master of the Horse
- Pontifex Maximus
- Princeps senatus
- Procurator
- Promagistrate
