= Constitution of the Roman Republic =

The constitution of the Roman Republic was a framework of uncodified norms and customs which, together with various written laws, guided the procedural governance of the Roman Republic. The constitution emerged from that of the Roman Kingdom, evolved substantively and significantly – almost to the point of unrecognisability – over the almost five hundred years of the republic. The final demise of republican government and norms from around 133 BC would lead to the rise of Augustus and his principate.

The republican constitution can be divided into three main branches:

- the Assemblies, composed of the people, which served as the supreme repository of political power and had the authority to elect magistrates, accept or reject laws, administer justice, and declare war or peace;
- the Senate, which advised the magistrates, acting primarily not on legal authority per se, but rather with its influence, and
- the magistrates, elected by the people to govern the republic, exercising religious, military, and judicial powers, along with the right to preside over and call upon the assemblies.

A complex set of checks and balances developed amongst these three branches. For example, the assemblies theoretically held all power, but were called and governed by the magistrates, who, controlling discussion, exercised dominating influence over them. Other magistrates could also veto proceedings before the assemblies, though until the late republic, this was rare. Similarly, to check the power of the magistrates, each magistrate could veto one of their colleagues and the plebeians elected tribunes who could intercede and veto the actions of a magistrate.

The republic's constitution, while malleable and evolving, still had substantive entrenched norms. Institutions such as the consuls, the senate, and tribunes evolved significantly in the early republic but remained relatively stable from the fourth century BC. Starting from a period of patrician domination, the Conflict of the Orders eventually granted plebeian citizens equal political rights, while also creating the tribunate to check patrician power and empowering the plebeian assembly, an assembly composed of the plebeians of Rome, with full legislative authority. Nor was it entirely unwritten, as there were many laws which required procedural changes or changed the number of magistrates elected.

The late republic saw a breakdown in elite cohesion which led to its loss of control over the state to a limited number of powerful dynasts within the elite. The resources of the provinces and a growing culture of political violence heightened competition within the Roman elite while weakening republican political norms that maintained cohesion. The increasing legitimisation of violence and centralisation of authority into fewer and fewer men would, with the collapse of trust in the republic's institutions, put it on a path to civil war and its transformation by Augustus into an autocratic regime cloaked with republican imagery and legitimacy.

== Assemblies ==
In Roman constitutional law, the assemblies were a sovereign authority, with the power to enact or reject any law, confer any magistracies, and make any decision. This view of popular sovereignty emerged elegantly out of the Roman conception that the people and the state (or government) were one and the same. With a single law, the people – properly assembled – held the authority to override the norms and precedents of the republic as well as ancient laws long unchanged.

There were two necessary components to any assembly: (1) the convening magistrate and (2) the citizens in the assembly itself. Assemblies did not participate or discuss matters laid before them, they heard the speakers put forth by the presiding officer. And after such discussion, the presiding officer could call for a direct up or down vote. Without a magistrate, there would be nobody to legally call upon the assembly; and without the citizens – or at least those who represent the citizens divided into voting blocks – there is naught but a magistrate.

Assemblies did not consist of the whole Roman people (Latin: populus Romanus) as only adult male citizens were permitted to participate. Those who actually showed up to form the Assemblies were most likely overwhelmingly members of the upper class with the time and leisure available for politics. Rome had no middle class shopkeepers: it was divided extremely unequally between the massive underclass and the very few tremendously rich. Until the Social War around 90 BC, Italian non-Romans were prohibited from voting as well due to their broad lack of citizenship with voting rights. That civil war, between Rome and her Italian allies, led to various laws granting citizenship and voting rights to their Italian allies.

Even after the massive expansion of the citizenry in the aftermath of the Social War, however, the Romans made no efforts in republican times to make voting easier or make the assemblies more representative. Votes were never called on the market days on which rural citizens might be present in the city; arcane and time-consuming procedures persisted unchanged. This was in part because the Romans did not view legitimacy to rest in the people qua multitude, but rather, in the few people assembled as a structured assembly observing the rules of procedure and symbolically representing the will of the people.

=== Procedure ===
There were three types of gatherings, the comitia, the concilium, and the contio. The first two were formal gatherings where legal decisions were made. The first, the comitia (or comitiatus), was an assembly of all Roman citizens convened to take a legal action, such as enacting laws, electing magistrates, and trying judicial cases. The second type of legislative meeting was the council (Latin: concilium), which was a gathering of a specific group of citizens. For example, the concilium plebis, or plebeian council, was for meetings of plebeians only.

The third type of gathering, the convention (Latin: contio), was an unofficial forum for communication where citizens gathered to hear public announcements and arguments debated in speeches as well to witness the examination or execution of criminals. Here, no legal decisions were made. Voters met in contione to deliberate prior to meeting in assemblies or councils to vote. These contiones were very common and served as means for politicians to engage with the public and receive feedback on their proposals, although only from whatever crowd that appeared on the day of the contio, which might bear no resemblance to the different crowd which voted on the final proposal. A substantial amount of public business also was expected to be conducted in public and in view of the people, forcing regular contiones for affairs ranging from reading decrees of the senate to renouncing provinces.

Assemblies and councils operated according to established procedures overseen by the augurs. The assemblies did not possess a right of legislative initiative of their own, instead being convened by magistrates and voting only on matters put before them by the presiding magistrate. The power granted to a magistrate was such that he could reject votes given by a voting block and request that it reconsider its choice. Over the years, laws were passed which mandated a written ballot, attempted to reduce voter intimidation, and established procedures to watch over voting and prevent voter fraud. For elections, it was not a matter of who received the most votes, but rather who could first be approved by a majority of the voting blocs. All votes had to be completed within a single day and had to be done again if interrupted or abandoned.

=== Assembly types ===
Roman citizens were organized into three types of voting units: curiae, centuria, and tribus or tribes. These corresponded to three different kinds of assemblies: the curiate assembly, the centuriate assembly, and the tribal assembly. Each unit (curia, century, or tribe) cast one vote before their assembly. The majority of individual votes – all given by male citizens – in any century, tribe, or curia decided how that unit voted.

In legislative matters, the assemblies very rarely rejected bills put before them, serving more as a legitimising symbol than a deliberative body. In the middle republic, only a few bills (most famously, war with Macedon in 200 BC, which was passed when the centuries were recanvassed shortly thereafter) were rejected, mostly due to counter-mobilisation from other politicians. In still later periods, laws were rejected only rarely and under special circumstances, reflecting division within the elite and resulting mobilisation of opposition.

==== Curiate assembly ====
The curiate assembly (Latin: comitia curiata) traditionally dates to the early monarchy, from 30 divisions of the city made by Romulus. By the middle republic, it served only a symbolic purpose. At some point, the 30 curiae ceased to actually meet and were instead represented by 30 lictors. For religious purposes, it also met as a comitia calata under the presidency of the pontifex maximus. This assembly had authority over some elements of family law and ratified the imperium of elected magistrates and promagistrates through a lex curiata de imperio. However, there was considerable debate in the late republic on whether or not a magistrate's election actually required ratification by the curiae; by the late republic, the effect of the lex curiata de imperio was "obscure". Broadly, however, the high degree of abstraction implicit in representing the whole Roman people in 30 lictors displayed the high degree to which Romans accepted all of their assemblies as symbolising the whole people as abstract voting blocks rather than as people directly.

==== Centuriate assembly ====
The centuriate assembly (Latin: comitia centuriata) was formed under the monarchy, and widely seen by the ancients as a means of allotting voting privileges in proportion to military duties demanded of the citizenry, disproportionately granting voting power to the richest in society, as at the time of its formation, the wealthiest were also expected to contribute the most to the military. By the middle republic, the connection between voting power and military service had long ceased, turning into a system to massively overweight older and richer citizens. Divided into 193 voting blocs, these blocs were further subdivided into five classes and a class of equites by wealth, each further subdivided by age into a junior and senior bloc (seniores being 46 years or older). The first class and the equites held 98 of the 193 voting blocs, an absolute majority. This was later reformed some time between 241 and 221 BC, eliminating the majority possessed by the first class with equites and moving about five per cent of the centuries to favour the second class. While described as democratic, "the change had no impact on the overall timocratic structure of the assembly". The body was primarily called for the election of consuls, praetors, and censors; legislation was increasingly rare by the second century BC.

==== Tribal assembly ====
The tribal assembly (Latin: comitia tributa), according to Livy, was formed around 471 BC. In 495 BC, shortly after the expulsion of the kings, there were four urban tribes and 17 rural tribes. By 241 BC, fourteen rural tribes had been added, bringing the total to thirty-five. The "tribes" were not ethnic or kinship groups, but rather a district to which people were assigned. A citizen's tribe was inherited from his father, and only changed upon adoption or reallocation in the census; over time, this meant that tribal affiliation had little relationship to a citizen's home or even place of birth. Because the urban poor were largely registered in the four urban tribes and the rural poor would be unable to go to Rome in person to cast their votes, the tribal assembly was likely dominated by the rich landholding magnates of the 31 rural tribes, with some allowance for the fact that rural immigrants to Rome usually retained their ancestral tribes. The vast majority of legislation was enacted in the comitia tributa, which also elected quaestors, curule aediles, military tribunes, and other minor magistrates.

==== Plebeian council ====
The plebeian council (Latin: concilium plebis) is more debated. Many modern historians believe that it was distinct from the tribal assembly in that it was organised on the same lines but only plebeians could vote. The main argument for the plebeian council being the tribal assembly – as in the two were the same institution – is that ancient sources make no such distinction. However, other scholars counter that late republican practice shows that curule magistrates held elections and legislated before the tribes, implying it could not be a solely plebeian institution. If the two were distinct, it is likely that the main difference was not in the eligible voters, but rather, the magisterial president: if called by a plebeian tribune it was a concilium plebis but if called by a curule magistrate it was a comitia tributa. If distinct, the plebeian tribunes and aediles, and later, various other minor posts, were therefrom elected. It also had the ability to enact laws called plebiscites, which in the early republic, only applied to plebs, but after the passage of lex Hortensia (287 BC), applied to all Romans.

The assemblies all retained theoretical judicial functions. The comitia centuriata was the only place where capital charges could be brought, with the comitia tributa and concilium plebis hearing still serious charges with punishment usually by fine. Most of these judicial powers by the last century BC had been taken over by the permanent jury courts (Latin: quaestiones perpetuae).

== Senate ==
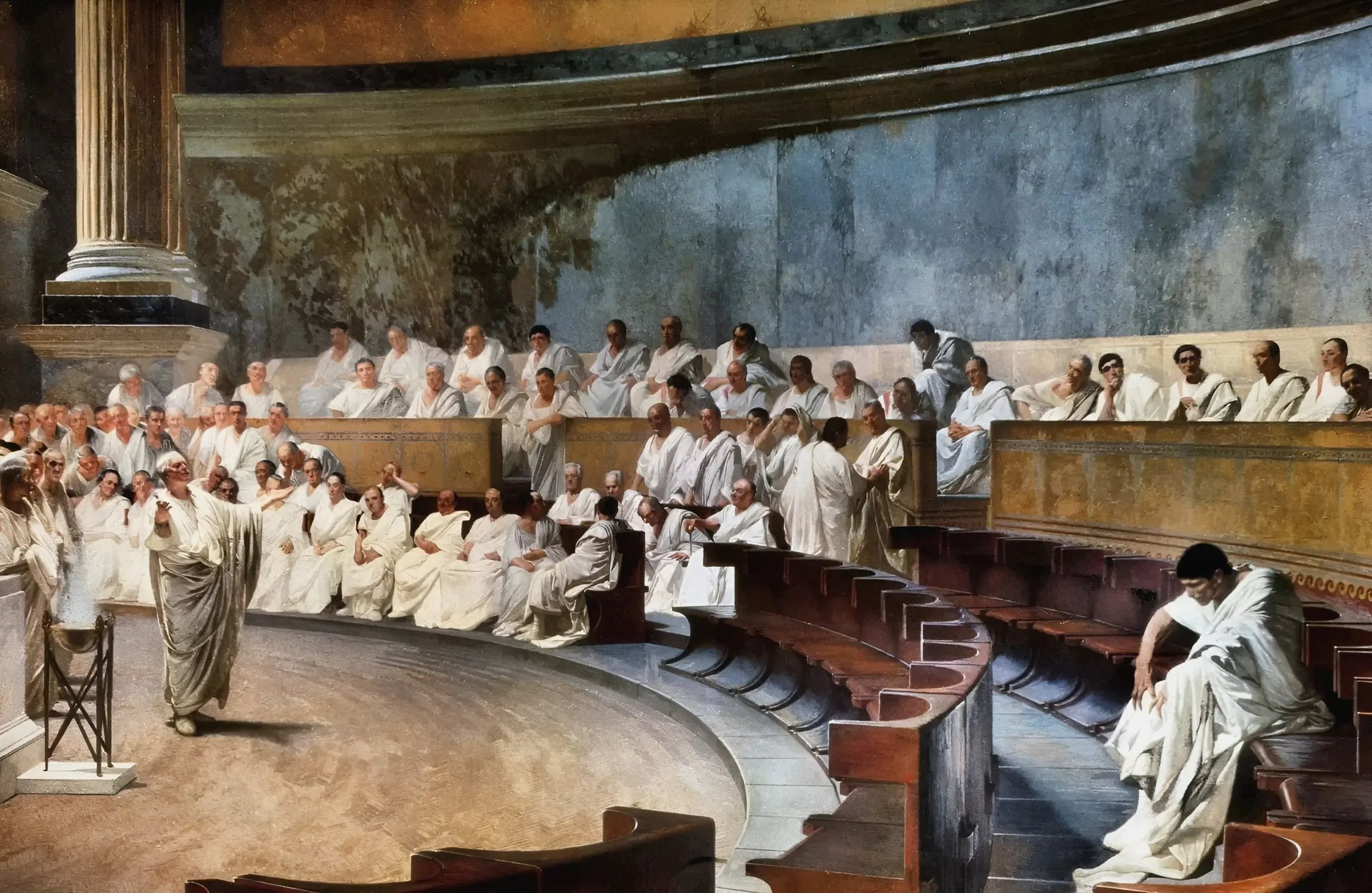
Artist's impression of the Senate in session; Cicero delivering his oration Catiline, from a 19th-century fresco

The senate was the predominant political institution in the Roman republic. The senate's authority derived primarily from custom and tradition. It was also one of the few places in which free political discussion could take place. Because of this, and the fact that basically the entire political elite were senators with procedural influence allocated to the influential ex-consuls, the senate had substantial influence on the current magistrates. Even without the official right to create law, senatorial opinion – enshrined in a senatus consultum (pl. senatus consulta) – was largely deferred to. In that role, the senate resolved disputes between magistrates and oversaw the allocation of public resources and responsibilities, including provinces, to magistrates. Some of its responsibilities were enshrined in specific legislation, such as the lex Caecilia Didia which gave the senate power to declare a law invalid.

During the monarchy, the senate consisted of persons selected to the position by the king. In the very early republic, senators were primarily chosen due to their birth, but by the late republic, and especially after Sulla, membership in the senate became predicated on having previously held a magistracy. The plebiscitum Ovinium of the late 4th century BC required the censors to enrol meritorious men into the senate; this, by c. 300 BC was taken to mean having served as dictator, magister equitum, consul, praetor, or curule aedile. Sometime between 122 and 102 BC tribunes were enrolled as well, with membership extended to quaestors in 81. In line with the censor's duty to protect morals, senators could be expelled if they were not of good character, found guilty of a criminal offence, or tainted with infamia. During the republic there was no evidence of any kind of property qualification. The senate consisted of around 300 prior to the dictatorship of Sulla, but after his dictatorship, it consisted of somewhere over 500 men.

The senate met in inaugurated spaces (Latin: templa) both outside and inside the formal boundary of the city (the pomerium). Such places included the curia in the forum – the curia Hostilia for much of the republic – but also other temples such as the Temple of Jupiter Optimus Maximus (the customary meeting place at the start of the year) as well as the temples of Fides, Concord, Castor and Pollux, and Jupiter Stator. Common locations outside the pomerium, necessary to allow magistrates with imperium to attend (imperium evaporating when entering the pomperium), included the temples of Bellona and Apollo along with the Curia of Pompey.

Many magistrates had the power to summon the senate, including the consuls, praetors, and tribunes. After religious preliminaries, the presiding magistrate gave a speech which needed not be neutral. After establishing facts, the president then outlined the issue asked of the senate, and debate started. The first to speak was the princeps senatus, followed by ex-consuls in an order decided by the president. If there was a consul-designate, it was customary to ask him first. After querying the ex-consuls, the ex-praetors were queried. This continued through all magisterial ranks. Unimportant matters could be voted on by a voice vote or by a show of hands, while important votes resulted in a physical division of the house, with senators voting by taking a place on either side of the chamber. Any vote was always between a proposal and its negative, but the senators could demand joined questions be divided up for separate votes. Since all meetings had to end by nightfall, a senator could talk a proposal to death (a filibuster) if he could keep the debate going until nightfall. A motion could be vetoed by a consul or one of the plebeian tribunes. If it was not vetoed, it was called a senatus consultum; senatorial opinions which were vetoed were instead termed senatus auctoritas and so recorded. The results were transcribed into a document by the presiding magistrate; the results were recorded in the aerarium (the public treasury) and sometimes published in a gazette.

In the late republic, the senate claimed – and was generally accepted to have – the authority to authoritatively advise magistrates to use force to suppress domestic uprisings – killing citizens and violating their legally-enshrined provocatio rights – by passing the so-called senatus consultum ultimum ("final decree of the senate"). The first such decree was moved in 121 BC against Gaius Gracchus and Marcus Fulvius Flaccus. In such instances, the consul presented information to support his position that the republic was in imminent danger and the senate responded with an opinion that "magistrates [should] defend the res publica and take whatever measures they thought necessary to see that the state did not suffer any harm": the effect of a decree from a legal perspective was minimal and it granted no legal immunity; it rather granted political cover, along with the promise of later senatorial sanction, for magistrates to evade accountability for illegal actions by giving the senate's support for them.

== Executive magistrates ==
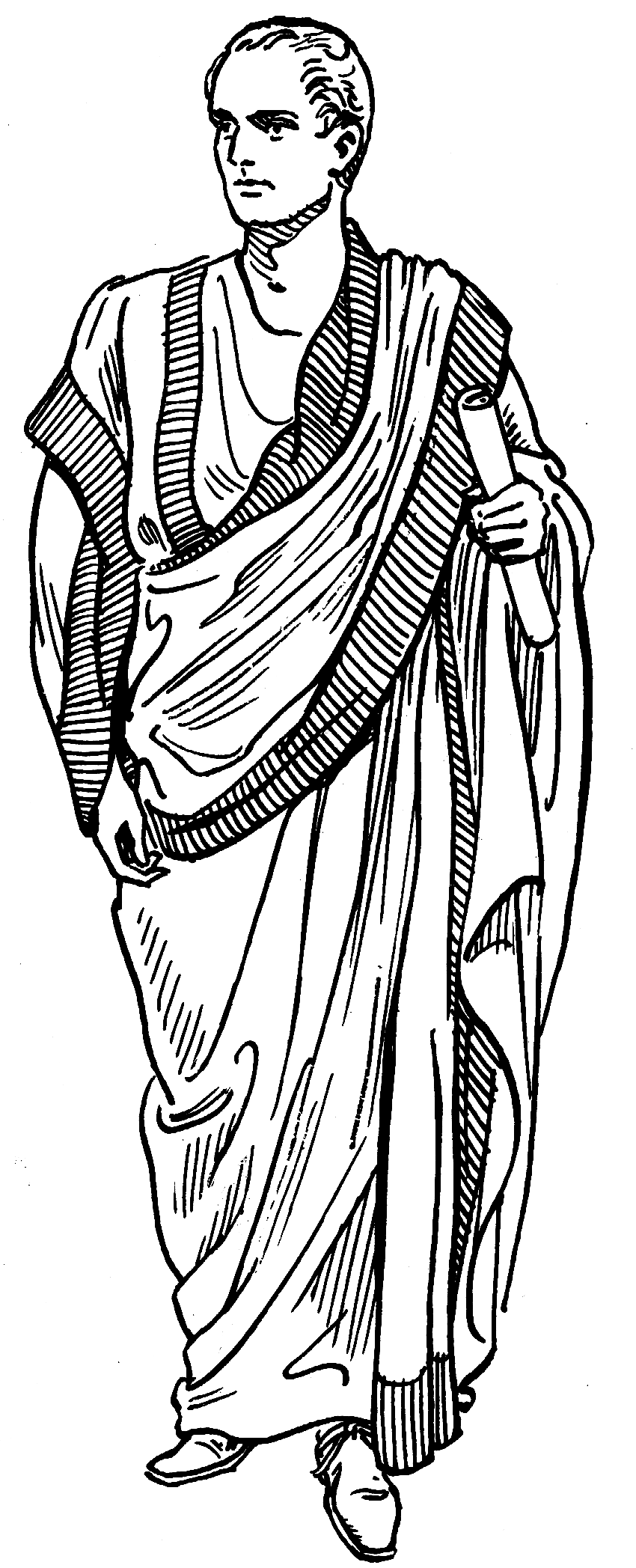
The toga praetexta, the dress of curule magistrates

The magistrates were elected by the people in competitive elections, with successive offices generally having more responsibilities and power. There were two broad categories of magistrates, the ordinary magistrates such as the consuls, products of the republican constitution, and the extraordinary magistrates such as the dictators, remnants of the monarchial constitution and reserved primarily for emergencies. Each magistrate held potestas, the authority to exercise the office's powers conferred by custom or statute. The most powerful magistrates, such as the extraordinary magistrates, consuls, and praetors, held a kind of authority known as imperium, the authority to command in a military or judicial sense.

The various magistrates were not required to work together. They largely acted as individuals pursuing their own policy goals and ambitions. Successfully administering the republic required substantial cooperation brought about by non-binding policy direction from the senate. Deference to the senate, ingrained in aristocratic social norms, therefore was necessary for the state to maintain any sense of coherent policy. Even so, the theoretical right of magistrates to veto each other was sparingly executed and even when exercised was normally by correction rather than direct prohibition.

=== Ordinary magistrates ===
Of the ordinary magistrates, there were two further divisions: the higher magistrates, composed of consuls, praetors, their prorogued equivalents, and the censors; and the lower magistrates, composed of the tribunes, aediles, quaestors and other minor positions. These offices were held in order – the cursus honorum – from junior to senior, with exceptions for the tribunate and aedilate, normally without repetition or tenure of a junior office after a senior one.

==== Consuls ====
The two consuls were the supreme magistrate for an annual term, endowed with imperium to command both in the civic and military spheres, and the auspices allowing them to consult the gods for the people. Such powers may have been derived from the unlimited powers of the kings, and were transmitted through an unbroken curule succession. One of the consuls was also president over the elections for curule offices. They were the normal military commanders during the late republic, with the two consuls leading separate consular armies in war, where their powers were largely unlimited. In domestic affairs they were responsible for holding the annual feriae Latinae (a spring festival), receiving embassies from foreign states, conducting discussion on those matters in the senate, and proposing legislation. By the middle and late Republic the consuls' judicial functions were rarely exercised except in serious matters.

==== Praetors ====
The next magistrate was the praetor. Their number increased over the course of the republic: initially one in 367 BC, a second was added in 242; two were added in 228 and 198; by Sulla's time there were eight. Also endowed with imperium, they were initially elected to military commanders – possibly to defend Rome while the consuls attacked – and as governors of provinces; only later would their main responsibility become to administer justice. The late Republican praetors, with their role overseeing judicial process, had a significant influence on Roman law. The praetors also had the right to introduce legislation, call the senate, and supervised certain religious festivals.

==== Promagistrates ====
Over time, as Rome's empire grew, the two annual consuls and the limited number of praetors ceased to be enough to command its many armies in the field or administer its many provinces. To solve this problem, it became normal to prorogue the authority of current consuls and praetors beyond their normal terms so they could continue to command in the field. Prorogation was a device which allowed the people, later the senate, to send someone to act in the place of another magistrate with imperium and auspicium while not holding that post. Over time, however, with increasing need for competent generals and administrators, prorogation became the norm; and the device was used, increasingly by the assemblies, also to imperium to popular politicians.

==== Censors ====
The two censors were appointed specifically to conduct the census. For this purpose they were elected semi-irregularly: during the middle republic this was slightly less than every five years, after Sulla's dictatorship the term became erratic. This involved counting the Roman people, assessing their property, and assigning them to their appropriate centuria and tribus. After the passage of lex Ovinia, the censors were also transferred the power from the consuls to control membership in the Senate. Along with the main responsibility of dealing with the census, the censors also were responsible for public morality, dealt with property disputes, public contracts, and the management of public lands. Such authority was also generally unreviewable except by the censor's colleague; if a colleague died in office, the other censor was required to resign.

==== Plebeian tribunes ====
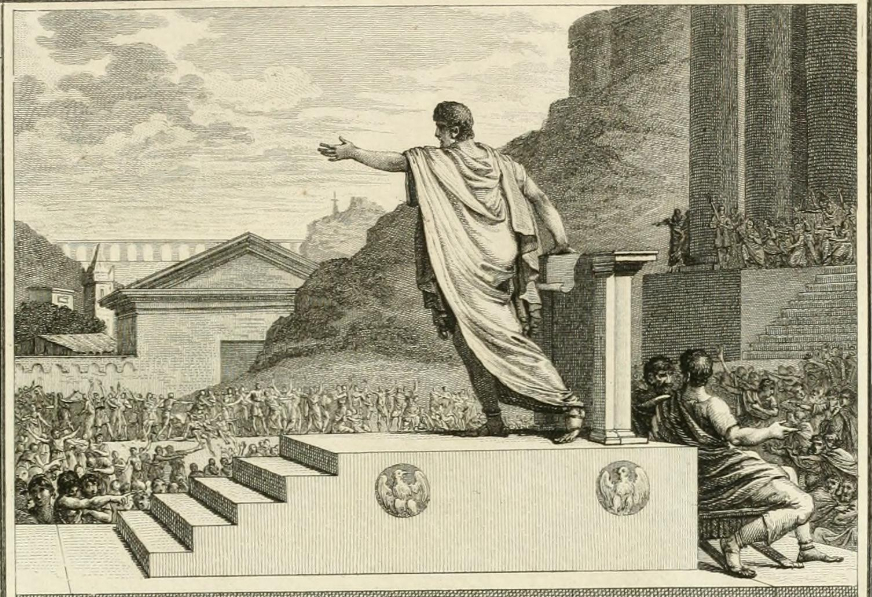
Gaius Gracchus, tribune of the people, presiding over the plebeian Council, in an artist's impression from 1799

The lower magistrates included the tribune of the plebs, who was elected by the plebeian council, and the aediles and quaestors, elected by the tribal assembly. The tribune was sacrosanct, i.e. inviolable, and protected the oaths sworn by plebeians to defend him. It was on this basis that the tribune could veto any political act or to protect any individual from an injustice committed by a magistrate, known as intercessio and auxilium, respectively. They also had powers to convene the senate, preside over the concilium plebis in a legislative or electoral capacity, and to address the people in a contio. While the tribunician powers emerged from a revolutionary background, they were by the middle republic drawn largely from the same group of aristocrats as those which made up the senate, meaning such powers were little exercised. Only during the late republic were such powers reasserted.

==== Aediles, quaestors, and the vigintisexviri ====
The aediles were in charge of various municipal tasks, e.g. the upkeep of temples, streets, and the water-supply. They were also responsible for public games, and some aspects of police work in the city. The quaestors were elected administrators, which could be put in charge of the treasury, the granaries, or various administrative postings in Italy, with the consuls, or in the provinces. In the late republic, election to the quaestorship became the basis for a life appointment to the Senate.

Other minor magistrates, by the late republic called the vigintisexviri, had administrative duties relating to six boards: judging free or slave status, policing, coining of money, road maintenance in Rome, road maintenance near Rome, and administration of justice in Capua and Cumae. These junior posts were usually held before election to the quaestorship, and this became a requirement after the reforms of Sulla.

=== Extraordinary magistrates ===
There were a number of extraordinary magistrates. First covered here are the dictator and the magister equitum (lit. 'master of horse'). Dictators were selected by the consuls to resolve some issue facing the republic that could not be dealt with by the ordinary magistrates. The magister equitum was then appointed by the dictator as his lieutenant. (Note: Lintott writes, "Once chosen, he could not be deposed, but his office ceased with that of his superior. In many respects he might function in parallel to the dictator, like a second consul, rather than as a direct subordinate. However, more spectacular stories about the office show that his subordination was a major issue".) The dictator had summum imperium and supreme authority within the scope of his mandate. The magister equitum had similar plenary authority, with parallel and somewhat subordinate authority to the dictator.

In the early and middle Republic, the dictatorship was largely a customary institution where the dictator's supreme authority was limited to the mandate (Latin: provincia) assigned along with the almost-universally-realised expectation that the dictator would quickly resolve the issue and resign to restore ordinary government. In the middle and later Republic, with the office of dictator falling out of fashion, the need for dictatorial authority was not granted to some extraordinary magistrate, but rather, to the consuls, through a senatus consultum ultimum, or final decree. This decree took the form of a recommendation from the Senate to the consuls to take whatever actions were necessary to defend the Republic. (Note: For clarification, Lintott explains that, 'It was not clear, for example, whether it was simple recommending a limited use of force to restore the rule of law or the extermination of those who are thought to have disturbed the peace'.) Due to its general vagueness, however, its use was hotly contested in the late Republic and is still debated among scholars today, as in a strict legal sense, the final decree did not grant legal authority to the consuls, but rather, served as an urging from the Senate to ignore the laws to protect the state.

The interrex was an extraordinary magistrate appointed when there were no curule magistrates – consuls, praetors, or dictators – in office. He was elected by the patrician members of the senate for a term of five days. With the authority to summon the senate and, most importantly, the assemblies, a series of interreges – the first interrex, by tradition, could not hold elections – was expected to hold elections as quickly as possible to restore ordinary consular government.

== Development ==
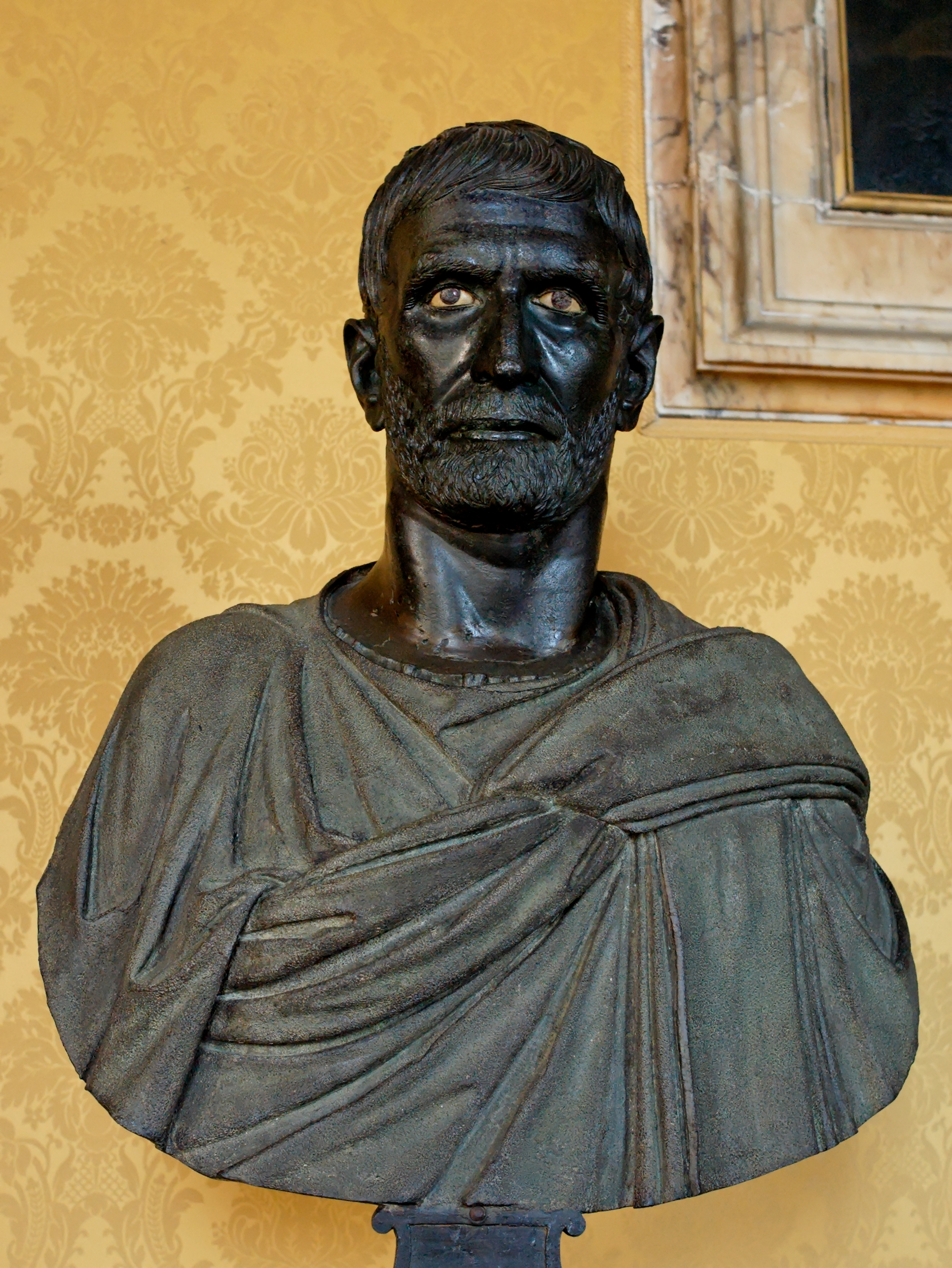
The "Capitoline Brutus", traditionally identified as a bust of Lucius Junius Brutus (died 509 BC), who himself was identified traditionally as the founder of the republic

=== Conflict of the orders ===
The main literary sources for the origins of the Roman political system, Livy and Dionysius of Halicarnassus, relied heavily on the Roman annalists, who supplemented what little written history existed with oral history. This lack of evidence poses problems for the reliability of the traditional account of the republic's origins. Many modern scholars now view, however, the Livian and annalistic accounts to be a "literary creation of the late republic" and that they broadly "cannot retain much value for... reconstructing early Roman history".

According to this traditional account, Rome had been ruled by a succession of kings. The Romans believed that this era, that of the Roman Kingdom, began in 753 BC and ended in 509. After the overthrow of the monarchy and the establishment of the Republic, the people of Rome began electing two consuls each year. According to the consular fasti, a list of the consuls going back to the foundation of the Republic, the first consuls were chosen in 509 BC. Modern scholars, however, stress a more clear evolution between monarchy and government led by elected magistrates. A growing number of historians also doubt the reliability of the consular fasti (the list of consuls ostensibly going back to the start of the Republic posted in Rome), viewing them as a "product of the late republic" with "minimal" accuracy on the early Republic. Remnants of the monarchy, however, were reflected in republican institutions. There is, however, evidence that the early Republic was a time of violent change, with the word rex carrying tyrannical connotations. The first assemblies of the republic emerged during the kingdom as means to ratify regal elections and the comitia centuriata was then repurposed to elect the first consuls. It is likely, however, that the exercise of military authority in the early republic was not institutionalised and consisted more of aristocrats leading private raids than formal state ratification of commanders' authority. The position of the consulship qua high general or imperium as legal military authority only becomes well founded at the end of the third century BC.

The early Republic of the literary accounts was dominated by the patricians, and those sources overwhelmingly focus on the conflicts between the patricians and the plebs, in what is known as the conflict of the orders. In 494 BC, during a military campaign, the plebeians under arms seceded to the mons Sacer outside the city and refused to fight in the campaign without political concessions. With the pressure of an external threat, the patricians were forced to recognise the office of plebeian tribune (Latin: tribunus plebis) and accept their sacrosanctity. This was the basis of the tribune's ability to veto (lit. 'I forbid') any political act or to protect any individual from an injustice committed by a magistrate, known as intercessio and auxilium, respectively. The people gave the tribunes, whose number at this early time is unclear, two assistants known as plebeian aediles. The attempt of the decemviri to entrench a patrician-dominated state, traditionally dated to 457 BC, was similarly thwarted by a plebeian secession. Reforms in 449 BC may have formalised recognition of military imperium by requiring its conferral by the comitia curiata. Shortly thereafter in 446 BC, quaestors, administrators with wide terms of reference, were first elected; and the office of censor was created to administer the census in 443 BC. The ancient literary sources also report the regular election of consular tribunes as a reaction of increased demand for generalship or as means to prevent plebeian assumption of military leadership; some modern scholars, however, reject these explanations and suggest them to be a late republican misunderstanding of the evidence.

Regardless, in 367 BC, with the Licinio-Sextian rogations, plebeians were allowed to stand for the consulship. This date also marks the emergence of the classical form of the republic with the end of the consular tribunate (if it existed) and the creation of the praetorship and aedilate. Traditionally viewed as emerging from the conflict of the orders, the settlement may also have emerged from a Roman need for more magistrates. The consulship and praetorship were at this time not clearly separated: "scholars increasingly view the Sextian-Licinian Rogations as establishing a college of three (and only three) praetors, two of whom eventually developed into the historical consuls". The lex Genucia some decades later in 342 BC went beyond allowing plebeians access to the consulship, and requiring at least one of the consuls to be a plebeian.

As the privileged status of the old patrician elite eroded over time, a plebeian aristocracy developed whose status was based on merit and popular election rather than birth. The late fourth century saw the emergence of the unified aristocratic class called the nobiles, which were both patrician and plebeian. While the patricians retained rights from time immemorial, the pre-eminence of the nobiles over time became centred on winning elections to offices before the people rather than on their circumstances of birth, producing a semi-open aristocracy which could incorporate elite families from outside Italy. Any final dispute ended in 287 BC with the last plebeian secession. To end the secession, the lex Hortensia was passed, which gave plebiscites – decrees of the concilium plebis – the force of law.

=== Developments through to Sulla ===
The middle and early late Republics saw gradual change in the constitution. The lex Villia annalis in 180 BC formalised the cursus honorum by setting minimum ages for each office. The 130s saw the introduction of secret ballot through the lex Gabinia tabellaria and lex Cassia tabellaria. The lex Domitia de sacerdotis in 104 abolished the cooption of priests in favour of election.

More dramatic through this period was the development of provincial administration and the promagistracy. Rome's expansion through the 3rd and 2nd centuries BC saw it acquire for the first time overseas provinces, which were governed by consuls or praetors assigned by the senate. As the number of provinces increased with Roman expansion, the election of magistrates was unable to keep up, forcing those magistrates to have their provincial commands extended. The emergence of prorogation meant that by the end of the second century BC, the generals were no longer serving magistrates but their prorogued equivalents acting in place of a consul or praetor (pro consule or pro praetore). Differences emerged between provincial governors and the senate, with the latter having few tools with which to control governors except on their return from abroad. A plethora of such tools developed, including laws making certain practices illegal, such as extortion, as well as establishing quaestiones perpetuae to try them for violations.

The senatus consultum ultimum, a senatorial decree advising the magistrates to use force to defend the republic (usually from internal uprisings), also emerged from 121 BC, with the senate exercising its traditional power to advise and magistrates following succinctly. The use of such power, though not challenged as per se invalid, was heavily debated. However, the senate's institutionalised resorts to force augured poorly for the republic, setting a precedent to resolve disputes between citizens not by consensus and arbitration but rather by the elimination of enemies from the body politic.

=== Sullan republic ===
The Sullan civil war, proscriptions, and reforms that followed saw a change in the character of the res publica, producing a novel constitutional structure unlike the consensus-based senatorial culture of the middle republic.

His reforms created a series of law codes, enforced by expanded quaestiones perpetuae staffed senators drawn from an expanded senate. The reforms also attempted to concentrate political power into the senate and the comitia centuriata, while trying to reduce the obstructive and legislative powers of the tribunes and plebeian council. To this end, he required that all bills presented to the assemblies first be approved by the senate, restricted the tribunician veto to only matters of individual requests for clemency, and required that men elected tribune would be barred from all other magistracies.

Sulla's reforms proved unworkable. With little legitimacy, his regime faced continuation of the civil war with Quintus Sertorius as well as a revolt in 78 BC by the then-consul Marcus Aemilius Lepidus. The larger senate and the retention of more imperium-holding magistrates close to the city made politics dysfunctional, difficult to influence, and unpredictable. The legacy of the Social war and Sullan civil war, in killing off or discrediting an entire generation of consuls, also reduced the influence of the senate in the state. By 70 BC, it had become clear that the neutering of the tribunes had to be reverted; the consuls Pompey and Crassus that year passed legislation with such effect.

=== End of the Roman Republic ===
The long proconsular commands given to Caesar and Pompey in the 50s BC have been thought of as a rejection of republican principles. Erich Gruen, in Last generation of the Roman republic, argued against this, noting that long commands had been common during Second Punic War as well as through the Jugurthine and Cimbric wars and the following Sertorian and Third Mithridatic wars. Such precedents by the Sullan republic were well known. Moreover, senatorial sanction for special commands was common throughout, with Caesar's Transalpine Gaul assigned by the senate and Pompey's commissions for corn and renewal in Spain also emerging therefrom.

The start of Caesar's civil war in 49 BC, however, is one of the suggested endpoints of the Republic. With insufficient information, there is no basis to believe Caesar planned for any sweeping reform to the republican system. Regardless, his assassination by the liberatores meant any such plans were never put into effect. It also, through the machinations of Antony, Octavian, and Lepidus, saw the sovereign people enact the lex Titia in 43 BC to create the trimvirate. Devolving the people's powers of election, appeal, and legislation triumvirs, the Republic was arguably abolished by one of its own core institutions. The transformation away from the republic would only emerge with Augustan settlements and the emperor Tiberius' successful accession in AD 14, placing Rome on a path away from a state without the domination of a single man.

== See also ==
- Byzantine Senate – 4th–13th century political institution
- Princeps senatus – First member by precedence of the Roman Senate
- Acta Senatus – Minutes of the Roman Senate
