= Valerio-Horatian laws =

Ancient Roman laws

The Valerio-Horatian laws (Latin: leges Valeriae Horatiae) were three laws which were passed by the consuls of Rome for 449 BC, Lucius Valerius Poplicola Potitus and Marcus Horatius Barbatus. They restored the right of appeal to the people and introduced measures which were favourable to the plebeians. The consuls' actions came after a plebeian rebellion, the second plebeian secession, which overthrew the second decemvirate, which had ruled tyrannically. The two consuls had shown sympathy towards the plebeians and, as a result, had been chosen to negotiate the resolution of the rebellion. Their new laws quelled the plebeian unrest.

== Background ==
In 450 BC, during what was to be the 200-year Conflict of the Orders between the patricians and the plebeians, the patricians gave “consent to the appointment of a body of legislators, chosen in equal numbers from plebeians and patricians to enact what would be useful to both orders and secure equal liberty for each.” The plebeians wanted a published set of laws so that there were clear and known rules and protections as well as punishments. Up until that time, the laws were unwritten and open to arbitrary use and, at times, abuse. A ten-man commission was appointed to develop the laws, the Decemviri Legibus Scribundis Consulari Imperio (decemviri means ten men). The consulship (the office of the two annually elected heads of the republic) and the plebeian tribunes (the representatives of the plebeians) were suspended. The decemviri were also to act as a government exempt from the right to appeal to the people against arbitrary actions on their part. The conduct of the first decemvirate was exemplary and it drew up ten bronze tablets of laws.

It was felt that two more laws were needed to complete the legislation. A new decemvirate was elected. According to Livy, the second decemvirate was despotic and abused the people, taking advantage of their exemption from the right to appeal. This eventually led to the plebeian rebellion known as the second plebeian secession. The plebeians seceded to Mons Sacer (Sacred Mount) outside the city and pledged to remain there until their demands were met. Their demands were the resignation of the decemviri, the restoration of the right to appeal to the people and the restoration of the plebeian tribunes and their powers. Lucius Valerius and Marcus Horatius, two patricians who had stood up to one instance of abuse of a plebeian by the decemviri and had shown sympathy towards the plebeians, were sent to Mons Sacer negotiate. The negotiations were successful, the decemviri resigned and the secession was called off. Lucius Valerius and Marcus Horatius were elected as the consuls for the year. They restored the right to appeal to the people and passed measures which were favourable to the plebeians to address their grievances which had emerged during the rebellion.

== The laws ==
Lex Valeria Horatia de plebiscitis. This established that the resolutions passed by the Plebeian Council were binding on all. The plebeians had created this body as their own assembly where they could debate their own issues during their first rebellion, the first plebeian secession (494 BC). The patricians were excluded from the Plebeian Council. The Council could also vote on laws which concerned the plebeians. It was convened and presided over by the plebeian tribunes, positions which had been created during the first plebeian rebellion. These tribunes proposed resolutions to the vote of the Council. These plebeian institutions were created for the self-defence of the plebeians against abuse by the consuls and the Roman aristocracy and were separate from the institutions of the patrician-controlled Roman senate. The patricians refused to recognise the Council's resolutions as laws binding on the whole people and therefore on the patricians as well. Livy wrote that as “it was as it were a point in controversy, whether patricians were bound by regulations enacted in an assembly of the commons, they [the consuls] proposed a law in the assembly of the centuries [the Assembly of the Soldiers, which voted on laws proposed by the consuls], that whatever the commons ordered collectively, should bind the entire people; by which law a most keen-edged weapon was given to motions introduced by tribunes."

Lex Valeria Horatia de provocatione. This was restoration of the right of appeal to the people (provocatio ad populum), which means calling out to the people. A citizen could call out to the people against the summary use of power against him by the consuls or officials. With this type of appeal the summary action undertaken would be stopped. This law also forbade the creation of any official positions that were exempt from the people’s right of appeal. Livy stated that through this law the right of appeal to the people “was not only restored but strengthened for the future by a fresh enactment. This forbade the appointment of any magistrate from whom there was no right of appeal, and provided that anyone who did so appoint might be rightly and lawfully put to death, nor should the man who put him to death be held guilty of murder.”

Lex Valeria Horatia de tribunicia potestate. This law restored the potestas tribunicia, the powers of the plebeian tribunes (often referred to as tribunician powers). It also put in place the principle of the inviolability (sacrosanctitas) of the plebeian tribunes, the aediles (the assistants of the tribunes) and the decemviri into law. This principle was based on the lex sacrata (sacred law), which was a religious sanction according to which a temple, sacred object or person could be declared physically inviolable (sacrosanct). According to Festus "Sacred laws are laws which have the sanction that anyone who broke them becomes accursed to one of the gods, together with his family and property". The violator became sacer (accursed), was considered as having harmed a god or the gods in addition to the sacrosanct object or person, became forfeit to the god(s), anyone who killed him/her was performing sacred duty and would not be punished and the dead violator was surrendered to the god(s) in question.

The principle of the inviolability of the plebeian tribunes had been established following the first plebeian rebellion. Besides being the leaders of the plebeians, the plebeian tribunes were the protectors of the plebeians. They had the power to stop actions by the consuls or officials which they deemed as summary and harmful to individual plebeians. This power rested on the principle that the person of the plebeian tribune was sacrosanct. Anyone who hurt him would be declared sacer. In effect this meant that the plebeians swore to kill whoever hurt their tribunes and this was given a religious basis. The plebeians undertook to protect their protectors.

Livy said that the consuls renewed the potestas tribunicia “with certain sacred rites revived from a distant past, and in addition to securing their inviolability by the sanctions of religion, they enacted a law that whoever offered violence to the magistrates of the plebs, whether tribunes, aediles [the assistants of the tribunes], or decemviral judges, his person should be devoted to Jupiter, his possessions sold and the proceeds assigned to the temple of Ceres, Liber, and Libera …”.

== Views of modern historians ==
In both the case of the law on the right of appeal and that on the plebiscites, there were three instances of such law. There were two other laws on appeal which were proposed by two consuls who were also members of the Valeria family, one by Publius Valerius Publicola in 509 BC and one by Marcus Valerius Corvus in 300 BC. Two other laws which provided for the plebiscites to be binding on the whole people were also proposed, one by Quintus Publilius Philo in 339 BC and one by Quintus Hortensius in 287 BC. This has led some historians to argue that in both cases the first and second laws are unhistorical and that only the third one is historical.

Cornell disputes the above view. He points out that Roman legislators repeatedly dealt with the same subject and incorporated the provisions of the existing law into the amendments or the new provisions of a new law. He argues that it cannot be proved that the three laws on appeal were identical, that the purpose of the Valerio-Horatian Law was “not to grant the right of appeal per se [in fact, it was a restoration], but to prohibit the creation of magistracies not subject to appeal,” and that we do not know anything about the content of the law of 300 BC. He notes that Livy said that Marcus Valerius Corvus’ law of appeal had was ‘more carefully set down’ and that this must be in comparison with previous laws on appeal. Livy also wrote “this was the third time since the expulsion of the kings that such a law had been introduced, by the same family in every instance” He specified that the second and third laws were renewals and said that he thought that the reason for this was that the wealth of a few carried more power than the liberty of the plebs. He added that the law forbade the scourging or execution of those who appealed, but merely provided that if anyone should disregard [its] injunctions it should be deemed a wicked act.

Regarding the law on plebiscites constituting laws binding the whole people, Cornell, again, thinks that the record of three subsequent laws on the same subject need not imply that the first two were unhistorical. He notes that between 449 BC (the year of the Lex Valeria-Horatia) and 287 BC (the year of the Lex Hortensia) there were thirty-five plebiscites which had the force of law. He argues that the law of 449 BC probably established the general principle, “but in some way restricted its freedom to do so, for instance, by making the plebiscites subject to the auctoritas partum or to the subsequent vote of the comitia populi, or indeed both.” Auctoritas patrum meant authority of the fathers (the patricians) through the patrician-controlled senate. This would explain the difficulties in getting proposals passed into law, such as the various failed attempts at agrarian reform to help the poor, which must have had the support of the poor plebeians and the Plebeian Council. The law of 339 BC might have partially removed these restrictions and that of 287 BC probably abolished them altogether and, therefore these two laws were not repetitions, but re-enactments which introduced specific amendments which decreased patrician obstruction of the plebiscites. This could be possible as the sources do not provide the ‘detailed provisions of these laws.’
