= 287 BC =

287 BC in various calendars
- Gregorian calendar: 287 BC; CCLXXXVII BC
- Ab urbe condita: 467
- Ancient Egypt era: XXXIII dynasty, 37
- Pharaoh: Ptolemy I Soter, 37
- Ancient Greek Olympiad (summer): 123rd Olympiad, year 2
- Assyrian calendar: 4464
- Balinese saka calendar: N/A
- Bengali calendar: −880 – −879
- Berber calendar: 664
- Buddhist calendar: 258
- Burmese calendar: −924
- Byzantine calendar: 5222–5223
- Chinese calendar: 癸酉年 (Water Rooster); 2411 or 2204 — to — 甲戌年 (Wood Dog); 2412 or 2205
- Coptic calendar: −570 – −569
- Discordian calendar: 880
- Ethiopian calendar: −294 – −293
- Hebrew calendar: 3474–3475
- Hindu calendars
- Vikram Samvat: −230 – −229
- Shaka Samvat: N/A
- Kali Yuga: 2814–2815
- Holocene calendar: 9714
- Iranian calendar: 908 BP – 907 BP
- Islamic calendar: 936 BH – 935 BH
- Javanese calendar: N/A
- Julian calendar: N/A
- Korean calendar: 2047
- Minguo calendar: 2198 before ROC 民前2198年
- Nanakshahi calendar: −1754
- Seleucid era: 25/26 AG
- Thai solar calendar: 256–257
- Tibetan calendar: ཆུ་མོ་བྱ་ལོ་ (female Water-Bird) −160 or −541 or −1313 — to — ཤིང་ཕོ་ཁྱི་ལོ་ (male Wood-Dog) −159 or −540 or −1312

Year 287 BC was a year of the pre-Julian Roman calendar. At the time it was known as the Year of the Consulship of Marcellus and Rutilus (or, less frequently, year 467 Ab urbe condita). The denomination 287 BC for this year has been used since the early medieval period, when the Anno Domini calendar era became the prevalent method in Europe for naming years.

== Events ==
=== By place ===
==== Roman Republic ====
- A new law, Lex Hortensia, gives much greater power to the Concilium Plebis (Plebeian Council) compared to the Senate. This law is passed following a threat from plebeian soldiers to secede. In the face of this threat, the Senate yields to plebeian concerns over their lack of political power and over their level of debt to the aristocracy. The law is named after Quintus Hortensius, a plebeian, who is made dictator to settle the controversy.
- With the Lex Hortensia in place, in theory the political distinctions in Rome between the patricians and the plebeians disappear. However, in practice, the coalition of leading plebeian families keep control which means that the patricians are able to largely nullify the power of the assemblies. So Roman government continues to be oligarchic in character.

==== Greece ====
- The Macedonians resent the extravagance and arrogance of Demetrius Poliorcetes and are not prepared to fight a difficult campaign for him. When Pyrrhus of Epirus takes the Macedonian city of Verroia, Demetrius' army promptly deserts and goes over to Pyrrhus' side as he is much admired by the Macedonians for his bravery. At this change of fortune, Phila, the mother of Antigonus, kills herself with poison.
- Demetrius besieges Athens without success. He leaves Antigonus in charge of the war in Greece, assembles all his ships and embarks with his troops to attack Caria and Lydia, provinces in Asia Minor controlled by Lysimachus.
- Agathocles is sent by his father Lysimachus against Demetrius. Agathocles defeats Demetrius and drives him out of his father's provinces.
- Pyrrhus is proclaimed King of Macedonia.

== Births ==
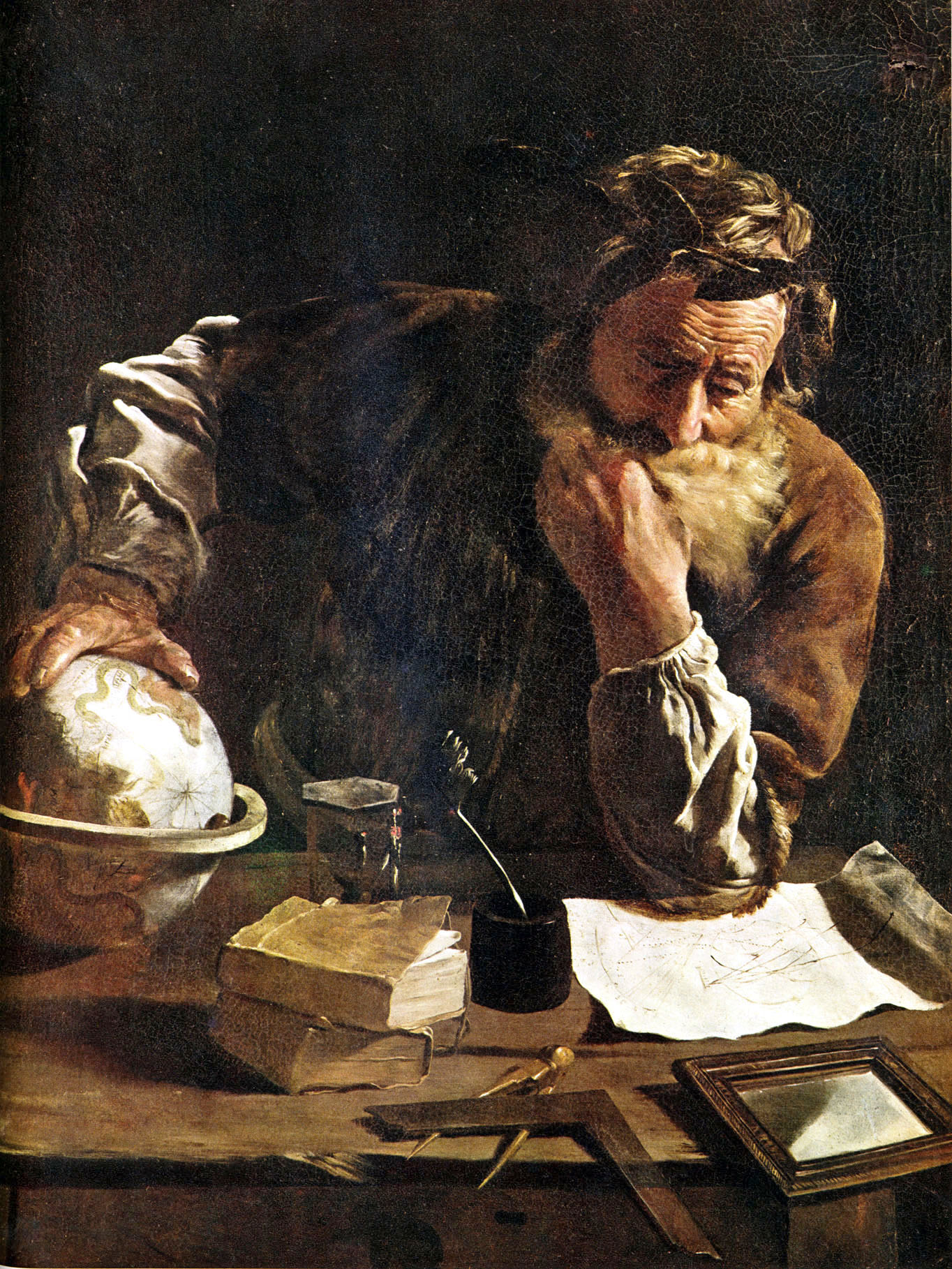
Archimedes
- Archimedes of Syracuse, Greek mathematician, physicist, engineer, astronomer and philosopher (approximate date) (d. c. 212 BC)

== Deaths ==
- Phila, daughter of Antipater, the regent of Macedonia
- Theophrastus, Greek Peripatetic philosopher and pupil of Aristotle (b. c. 372 BC)
