= Secessio plebis =

Exercise of power by Rome's plebeian citizens

Secessio plebis (withdrawal of the commoners, or secession of the plebs) was an informal exercise of power by Rome's plebeian citizens between the 5th century BC and 3rd century BC, similar in concept to the general strike. During the secessio plebis, the plebs would abandon the city en masse in a protest emigration and leave the patrician order to themselves. Therefore, a secessio meant that all shops and workshops would shut down and commercial transactions would largely cease. This was an effective strategy in the Conflict of the Orders due to strength in numbers; plebeian citizens made up the vast majority of Rome's populace and produced most of its food and resources, while a patrician citizen was a member of the minority upper class, the equivalent of the landed gentry of later times. Authors report different numbers for how many secessions there were. M. Cary and H. H. Scullard state there were five between 494 BC and 287 BC.

== Secessions in Roman history ==
=== First Secession – 494 BC ===
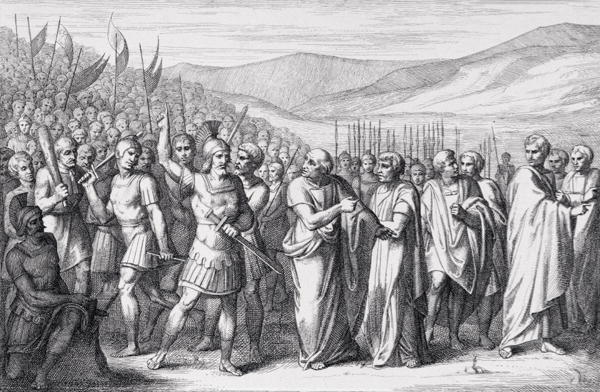
The Secession of the People to the Mons Sacer, engraving by B. Barloccini, 1849

Beginning in 495 BC, and culminating in 494–493 BC, the plebeian class of Rome grew increasingly unhappy with the political rule of the patrician class. At this time, the Roman city-state was governed by two consuls and the senate, which performed executive and most of the legislative functions of Rome. Both of these governing bodies were composed of only patricians, who were generally a wealthy minority of the Roman populace.

In 495 BC, the plebeian populace of Rome began to raise significant concerns about debt, including questioning the necessity of beatings and imprisonment of debtors by money-lenders. Roman historian Livy records an account of a former military official throwing himself into the forum in an extremely dishevelled state, telling the people of his troubles. He explained that during the war against the Sabines his estate was torched by the enemy and his possessions stolen. Upon returning home, he was forced to take a loan to afford paying a tax that had been imposed on him, driving him deeply into debt due to usury. This resulted in him being forced to give up family properties including his grandfather and father's farms. When this was still insufficient, he was taken by his creditors to a prison, whipped, and threatened with death. The people at the forum were angered and the story quickly spread, drawing a large crowd into an uproar.

After much anticipation about consul or senate action to address popular debt concerns, consul Appius worsened the situation by passing unpopular decrees reinforcing the imprisonment of debtors by creditors. This outrage further compounded by continued senate inaction resulted in the plebeians seceding to the Mons Sacer (the Sacred Mountain), over three miles from the city, on the advice of Lucius Sicinius Vellutus. The plebeians then established basic defences in the area, waiting for senate action.

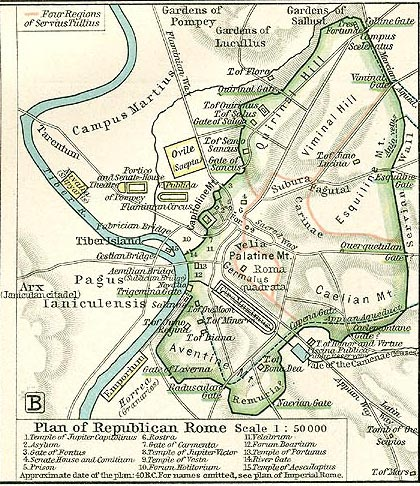
Map of Republican Rome by William R Shepherd, 1923

After the secession, the senate finally took action to address the issue. Negotiating with three envoys from the plebeians, the senate came to a resolution. The patricians freed some of the plebs from their debts and conceded some of their power by creating the office of the Tribune of the Plebs. This office was the first government position to be held by the plebs, since at this time the office of consul was held by patricians solely. Plebeian Tribunes were made personally sacrosanct during their period in office, meaning that any person who harmed them was subject to punishment by death.

=== Second Secession – 449 BC ===
The Second Secessio Plebis of 449 BC was precipitated by the abuses of a commission of the decemviri (Latin for "ten men") and involved demands for the restoration of the plebeian tribunes (the representatives of the plebeians) and of the right to appeal, which had been suspended.

In 450 BC Rome decided to appoint the decemviri which was tasked with compiling a law code (which became the Law of the Twelve Tables). The commission was given a term of one year, during which the offices of state were suspended. The decemviri were also exempted from appeal. In 450 BC, they issued a set of laws, but did not resign at the end of their term and held onto their power instead. They killed a soldier, a former plebeian tribune, who had criticised them. One of the decemviri, Appius Claudius Crassus, attempted to rape Verginia, a beautiful plebeian girl, the daughter of Lucius Verginius, a respected centurion. To prevent this, her father killed her, in order to uphold her freedom and virtue. This sparked riots which started when the crowd witnessed the incident and spread to the army, encamped outside the city. The crowd went to the Aventine Hill.

The senate pressured the decemviri to resign, but they refused. The people decided to withdraw to Mons Sacer, as they had during the first secession. The senate blamed the decemviri for the new secession and managed to force their full resignation. The body selected two senators, Lucius Valerius Potitus and Marcus Horatius Barbatus, to go meet with the people to negotiate. Those gathered at Mons Sacer demanded the restoration of both the plebeian tribunes and the right to appeal, as they had been suspended during the term of the decemviri. The senate's delegation of two agreed to these terms and they returned to the Aventine Hill and elected their tribunes.

Lucius Valerius Potitus and Marcus Horatius Barbatus became the consuls for 449 BC. They introduced new laws which increased the power and added to the political strength of the plebeians. The Valerio-Horatian laws stipulated that the laws passed by the Plebeian Council were binding of all Roman citizens (that is, both patricians and plebeians) despite the patrician opposition to the requirement that they adhere to the universal law. However, once passed, these laws had to receive the approval of the senate (auctoritas patrum). This meant that the senate had the power of veto over the laws passed by the plebeians. Lex Valeria Horatia de senatus consulta ordered that the senatus consulta (the decrees of the senate) had to be kept in the Temple of Ceres by the plebeian aediles (assistants of the plebeian tribunes). This meant that the plebeian tribunes and aediles had knowledge of these decrees, which previously was privileged knowledge. Thus, the decrees entered into the public domain. In the past, the consuls had been in the habit of suppressing or altering them. The lex Valeria Horatia de provocatio forbade the creation of state offices that were not subject to appeal.

=== Third Secession – 445 BC ===
As part of the process of establishing the Twelve Tables of Roman law, the second decemvirate placed severe restrictions on the plebeian order, including a prohibition on the intermarriage of patricians and plebeians. Gaius Canuleius, one of the tribunes of the plebs in 445 BC, proposed a rogatio repealing this law. The consuls vehemently opposed Canuleius, arguing that the tribune was proposing nothing less than the breakdown of Rome's social and moral fabric, at a time when the city was faced with external threats. (Note: Specifically, a revolt at Ardea, Veientes raiding Roman territory, and increased activity at a fortification of the Aequi and Volsci.)

Undeterred, Canuleius reminded the people of the many contributions of Romans of lowly birth, and pointed out that the Senate had willingly given Roman citizenship to defeated enemies, even while maintaining that the marriage of patricians and plebeians would be detrimental to the state. He then proposed that, in addition to restoring the right of conubium, the law should be changed to allow plebeians to hold the consulship; all but one of the other tribunes supported this measure.

A remark by a consul, that the children of mixed marriages might incur the displeasure of the gods, inflamed the plebeians into a military strike, refusing to defend the city against attacking neighbours. This caused the consuls to yield to their demands, allowing a vote on Canuleius' original rogatio. The prohibition on intermarriage between patricians and plebeians was thus repealed.

However, the proposal that would permit plebeians to stand for the consulship was not brought to a vote, threatening a radical escalation of the conflict between the plebeian assembly and the patrician senate. A compromise was instead suggested that military tribunes with consular power might be elected from either order. This proposal was well-received, and the first consular tribunes were elected for the following year.

=== Fourth Secession – 342 BC ===
This fourth secession is noted by Livy. The Oxford Classical Dictionary refers to this as an "obscure military revolt." The Leges Genuciae may have been passed as a result. See Roman army mutiny in 342 BC for more information.

=== Fifth Secession – 287 BC ===
In 287 BC, the plebeians seceded for the fifth and final time. In 290 BC, Roman armies led by consuls Manius Curius Dentatus and Publius Cornelius Rufinus conquered large territories in the plains of Rieti and Amiternum from the Sabines. After the war, lands were distributed solely to the Patricians. Meanwhile, plebeian farmers, many of whom had fought in the war, found difficulty in repaying debts incurred with these wealthy patricians. This time plebeians seceded to the Aventine Hill in protest. To resolve the matter, Quintus Hortensius was appointed as dictator, who convinced the crowd to stop the secession.

Shortly afterwards Hortensius promulgated a law, the Lex Hortensia, which established that the laws decided on by plebeian assemblies (plebiscite) were made binding on all Roman citizens, including patricians. This law finally eliminated the political disparity between the two classes, closing the Conflict of Orders after about two hundred years of class struggle. This event, although far from resolving all the economic and social inequalities between patricians and plebeians, nevertheless marked an important turning point in Roman history as it gave rise to the formation of a new type of patrician-plebeian nobility (nobilitas) which, allowing continuity in the government of the republic, constituted one of the main elements of strength in its economic and military expansion.

== See also ==
- Aventine Secession (20th century)
- Crisis of the Roman Republic

== Bibliography ==
- Livy, "Ab urbe condita"
- Cornell, T.J., "The Beginnings of Rome", Routledge, 1995.
- 'The Growth of Plebeian Privilege in Rome', The English Historical Review No. II (April 1886)
- Forsythe, G., A Critical History of Early Rome, Berkeley, 2005
- Florus, Epitome, Lib. I, X
