= Lucius Sicinius Vellutus =

Leading Roman plebeian and one of the first tribunes (493 BC)

- Tribune of the Roman Republic
- Reign: 493 BC

Uprising of the plebeians, c. 494 BCE

Lucius Sicinius Vellutus was a leading plebeian in ancient Rome, of the gens Sicinia.

In 494 and 493 BC, during a period of intense popular discontent, Sicinius advocated that the plebeians should secede from Rome and make camp on the Mons Sacer. The plebs followed his advice, and seceded. A reconciliation was agreed between the plebeians and patricians, and as a result the plebeians became entitled to elect annual magistrates known as tribunes. Sicinius was elected one of the first tribunes, holding office for the consular year 493 BC.

The perceived success of the secession led by Sicinius became a precedent that inspired at least four later plebeian protests called secessio plebis. Taken together, this period of social conflict during the early history of the Roman Republic is generally referred to as the Conflict of the Orders. Sicinius also appears as a character in Shakespeare's play Coriolanus, which concerns the events of 493 BC.
