= 212 BC =

212 BC in various calendars
Gregorian calendar	212 BC; CCXII BC
Ab urbe condita	542
Ancient Egypt era	XXXIII dynasty, 112
Pharaoh	Ptolemy IV Philopator, 10
Ancient Greek Olympiad (summer)	142nd Olympiad (victor)¹
Assyrian calendar	4539
Balinese saka calendar	N/A
Bengali calendar	−805 – −804
Berber calendar	739
Buddhist calendar	333
Burmese calendar	−849
Byzantine calendar	5297–5298
Chinese calendar	戊子年 (Earth Rat); 2486 or 2279 — to — 己丑年 (Earth Ox); 2487 or 2280
Coptic calendar	−495 – −494
Discordian calendar	955
Ethiopian calendar	−219 – −218
Hebrew calendar	3549–3550
- Hindu calendars
Vikram Samvat	−155 – −154
Shaka Samvat	N/A
Kali Yuga	2889–2890
Holocene calendar	9789
Iranian calendar	833 BP – 832 BP
Islamic calendar	859 BH – 858 BH
Javanese calendar	N/A
Julian calendar	N/A
Korean calendar	2122
Minguo calendar	2123 before ROC 民前2123年
Nanakshahi calendar	−1679
Seleucid era	100/101 AG
Thai solar calendar	331–332
Tibetan calendar	ས་ཕོ་བྱི་བ་ལོ་ (male Earth-Rat) −85 or −466 or −1238 — to — ས་མོ་གླང་ལོ་ (female Earth-Ox) −84 or −465 or −1237

Year 212 BC was a year of the pre-Julian Roman calendar. At the time it was known as the Year of the Consulship of Flaccus and Pulcher (or, less frequently, year 542 Ab urbe condita). The denomination 212 BC for this year has been used since the early medieval period, when the Anno Domini calendar era became the prevalent method in Europe for naming years.

== Events ==
=== By place ===
==== Illyria ====
- After being stopped twice by the Romans in his attempts to invade Illyria by sea, and constrained by the Roman commander Marcus Valerius Laevinus' fleet in the Adriatic, Philip V of Macedon keeps his activities in Illyria land based. Keeping clear of the coast, he takes Dassaretis, Atintani and Parthini, and the town of Dimale.

==== Thrace ====
- Tylis is destroyed by the Thracians.

==== Carthage ====
- Syphax, king of the western Numidian tribe, the Masaesyli, concludes an alliance with the Romans and they send military advisers to help Syphax train his soldiers. He then attacks the eastern Numidians (the Massylii) ruled by Gala, who is an ally of the Carthaginians. The Carthaginian general Hasdrubal travels to northern Africa from Spain to stamp out the uprising by the Numidians.

==== Spain ====
- The Roman generals Publius Cornelius Scipio and his elder brother, Gnaeus Cornelius Scipio Calvus, capture Saguntum (modern Sagunto) from the Carthaginians.

==== Seleucid Empire ====
- Antiochus III leaves for a campaign in Asia, where he will reach as far as India and mostly manage to recover the areas conquered earlier by Alexander the Great.
- Having recovered the central part of Anatolia from the usurper Achaeus, Antiochus III turns his forces to recover the outlying provinces to the north and east of the Seleucid kingdom.
- Antiochus III gives his sister Antiochia in marriage to King Xerxes of Armenia, who acknowledges Antiochus III's suzerainty and pays him tribute.

==== Roman Republic ====
- Publius Licinius Crassus Dives is elected "pontifex maximus" over more distinguished candidates, despite never having held any major offices. He will hold this position until his death.
- The Roman soldiers billeted in Tarentum so alienate the citizens of the city that conspirators admit the Carthaginian general Hannibal to the city. The conspirators then defeat the Roman contingent in it. Hannibal keeps control of his troops so that looting is limited to Roman houses. The citadel in Tarentum remains under Roman control, which denies Hannibal the use of the harbour.
- The Roman consuls, Appius Claudius Pulcher and Quintus Fulvius Flaccus, besiege Capua with eight legions. Hanno moves to Beneventum to try to help the inhabitants of Capua, but he is defeated by the Romans.
- The Capuans then send an appeal for help to Hannibal. In response, Hannibal sends 2,000 Numidian cavalry as reinforcements to Capua. The combined Carthaginian forces defeat the Roman force led by Flaccus and Pulcher, the latter of whom will soon die of wounds he has sustained.
- The Battle of the Silarus is fought between Hannibal's army and a Roman force led by praetor Marcus Centenius Penula. The Carthaginians are victorious, effectively destroying Centenius Penula's army.
- The Battle of Herdonia is fought between Hannibal's Carthaginian army and Roman forces who are laying siege to Herdonia led by praetor Gnaeus Fulvius Flaccus, brother of the consul, Quintus Fulvius Flaccus. The Roman army is destroyed, leaving Apulia free of Romans for the year.
- After a two year siege, Roman general, Marcus Claudius Marcellus, gradually forces his way into Syracuse and takes it in the face of strong Carthaginian reinforcements and despite the use of engines of war designed by the Greek mathematician and scientist Archimedes (such as the Claw of Archimedes).
- Although Marcellus wishes to spare the lives of the Syracusans, he is unable to prevent the sack of the city by his soldiers, which includes the killing of Archimedes. Marcellus carries off the art treasures of Syracuse to Rome, the first recorded instance of a practice which is to become common.

==== China ====
- Construction begins on the Epang Palace.

== Deaths ==
- Archimedes of Syracuse, Greek mathematician and scientist, who has calculated formulae for the areas and volumes of spheres, cylinders, parabolas and other plane and solid figures. He has also founded the science of hydrostatics, including the principle of the upthrust on a floating body which has led to his cry, "Eureka". Thirdly, he has invented siege-engines for use against the Romans and the Archimedean screw to raise water (b. c. 287 BC)
- Tiberius Sempronius Gracchus, Roman consul from 215 to 213 BC
- Xerxes of Armenia (assassinated by his wife Antiochia)
