= Conflict of the Orders =

Political conflict in the Roman Republic, 500–287 BC

The Conflict of the Orders, also called Struggle of the Orders, was a class war between the plebeians (commoners) and patricians (aristocrats) of the ancient Roman Republic lasting from 500 BC to 287 BC in which the plebeians sought political equality with the patricians. It played a major role in the development of the Constitution of the Roman Republic. Shortly after the founding of the Republic, this conflict led to a secession from Rome by the Plebeians to the Sacred Mount at a time of war. The result of this first secession was the creation of the office of plebeian tribune, and with it the first acquisition of real power by the plebeians.

At first, only patricians were allowed to stand for election to political office, but over time these laws were revoked, and eventually all offices were opened to the plebeians. Since most individuals who were elected to political office were given membership in the Roman Senate, this development helped to transform the Senate from a body of patricians into a body of both patrician and plebeian aristocrats. This development occurred at the same time that the plebeian legislative assembly, the Plebeian council, was acquiring additional power. At first, its acts ("plebiscites") applied only to plebeians, although after 339 BC, with the institution of laws by the second plebeian dictator Quintus Publilius Philo, these acts began to apply to both plebeians and patricians. The most fundamental change, however, was the granting of tribunicia potestas (tribunician power) in which tribunes of the plebs could veto unfavorable legislation.

== The Era of Patricians (494–367 BC) ==
The Conflict of the Orders began less than 20 years after the Republic was founded. Under the existing system, the poorer plebeians made up the bulk of the Roman army. During their military service, the farms on which their livelihood depended were left abandoned. Unable to earn a sufficient income, many turned to the patricians for aid, which left them open to abuse and even enslavement. As the patricians controlled Roman politics, the plebeians found no help from within the existing political system. Their solution was to go on strike. In 494 BC Rome was at war with three Italic tribes (the Aequi, Sabines and Volsci), but the plebeian soldiers, advised by Lucius Sicinius Vellutus, refused to march against the enemy and instead seceded to the Mons Sacer outside Rome. A settlement was negotiated and the patricians agreed that the plebs be given the right to meet in their own assembly, the Plebeian Council (Concilium Plebis), and to elect their own officials to protect their rights, the tribunes of the plebs (tribuni plebis).

During the 5th century BC, there were a number of unsuccessful attempts to reform Roman agrarian laws to distribute newly conquered territories amongst the plebs. In a number of instances, these reforms were advocated by the plebeian tribunes.

In 471 BC, the Lex Publilia was passed, marking an important reform shifting practical power from the patricians to the plebeians. The law transferred the election of the tribunes of the plebs to the tribal assembly (comitia tributa), thereby freeing their election from the influence of the patrician clients.

During the early years of the republic, the plebeians were not allowed to hold magisterial office. While the plebeian tribunes regularly attempted to block legislation unfavorable to their order, the patricians frequently tried to thwart them by gaining the support of another tribune. One example of this occurred in 448 BC when only five tribunes were elected to fill ten positions; following tradition and pressured by the patricians, they co-opted five colleagues, two of whom were patricians. Concerns that the patricians would attempt to influence future elections in this manner, or by obtaining the office themselves to prevent the plebeian tribunes from exercising their powers, led to the passage of the Lex Trebonia, forbidding the plebeian tribunes from co-opting their colleagues in the future.

In 445 BC, the plebeians demanded the right to stand for election as consul (the chief-magistrate of the Roman Republic), but the Roman Senate refused to grant them this right. Ultimately, a compromise was reached, and while the consulship remained closed to the plebeians, imperium, the authority of the consuls to command, was granted to a select number of military tribunes. These individuals, the "military tribunes with consular powers" (tribuni militum consulari potestate) — usually shortened to "consular tribunes" — were elected by the centuriate assembly (comitia centuriata), with the Senate having the power to veto any such election. This was the first of many attempts by the plebeians to achieve political equality with the Patricians.

Starting around the year 400 BC, a series of wars were fought against several neighboring tribes, including the Aequi, the Volsci, and the Latins, along with the city of Veii. The disenfranchised plebeians, who made up a significant portion of the army, grew restless from bloodshed, while the patrician aristocracy enjoyed the fruits of the resulting conquests. The plebeians demanded real concessions, and the tribunes of the plebs Gaius Licinius Stolo and Lucius Sextius Lateranus passed a series of reforms in 367 BC, known as the Lex Licinia Sextia. This law dealt with the economic plight of the plebeians, and also required the election of at least one plebeian consul each year. The opening of the consulship to the plebeians probably also led to the creation of two new magistracies, the praetorship and curule aediles, initially open only to the patricians.

Shortly after the founding of the republic, the Centuriate Assembly became the principal Roman assembly in which magistrates were elected, laws were passed, and trials occurred. Also around this time, the plebeians assembled into an informal plebeian curiate assembly, which was the original plebeian council. Since they were organized on the basis of the curiae, they remained dependent on their patrician patrons. In 471 BC, a law was passed due to the efforts of the tribune Volero Publilius, which allowed the plebeians to organize by tribe, rather than by curia. Thus, the plebeian curiate assembly became the plebeian tribal assembly, and the plebeians became politically independent.

During the regal period, the king nominated two equestrians to serve as his assistants, and after the overthrow of the monarchy, the Consuls retained this authority. However, Cicero tells us that beginning in 447 BC, these equites were elected by a tribal assembly, presided over by a magistrate. It seems as though this was the first instance of a joint patrician-plebeian tribal assembly, and thus was probably an enormous gain for the plebeians. While patricians were able to vote in a joint assembly, there were never very many patricians in Rome. Thus, most of the electors were plebeians, and yet any magistrate elected by a joint assembly had jurisdiction over both plebeians and patricians. Therefore, for the first time, the plebeians seemed to have indirectly acquired authority over patricians. Most contemporary accounts of an assembly of the tribes refer specifically to the plebeian council.

The distinction between the joint tribal Assembly and the plebeian council is not well defined in the contemporary accounts, and because of this, the very existence of a joint tribal assembly can only be assumed through indirect evidence. During the 5th century BC, a series of reforms were passed, the leges Valeriae Horatiae the laws of the consuls Valerius and Horatius, which ultimately required that any law passed by the plebeian council have the full force of law over both plebeians and Patricians. This gave the plebeian tribunes, who presided over the plebeian council, a positive character for the first time. Before these laws were passed, tribunes could only interpose the sacrosanctity of their person (intercessio) to veto acts of the Senate, assemblies, or magistrates. It was a modification to the Valerian law in 449 BC which first allowed acts of the plebeian council to have the full force of law over both plebeians and patricians, but eventually the final law in the series was passed (the "Shortening Law"), which removed the last check that the patricians in the Senate had over this power.

== The end of the Conflict of the Orders (367–287 BC) ==
In the decades following the passage of the Licinio-Sextian law of 367 BC, a series of laws were passed which ultimately granted plebeians political equality with patricians. The patrician era came to a complete end in 287 BC, with the passage of the Hortensian law. When the curule aedileship had been created, it had only been opened to Patricians. However, an agreement was ultimately secured between the plebeians and the patricians. One year, the curule aedileship was to be open to plebeians, and the next year, it was only to be open to patricians. Eventually, however, this agreement was abandoned and the plebeians won full admission to the curule aedileship. In addition, after the consulship had been opened to the plebeians, the plebs acquired a de facto right to hold both the Roman dictatorship and the Roman censorship since only former consuls could hold either office. 356 BC saw the appointment of the first plebeian dictator, and in 339 BC the plebeians facilitated the passage of a law (the lex Publilia Philonis), which required the election of at least one plebeian censor for each five-year term. In 337 BC, the first plebeian praetor (Q. Publilius Philo) was elected. In addition, during these years, the plebeian tribunes and the senators grew increasingly close. The Senate realized the need to use plebeian officials to accomplish desired goals, and so to win over the tribunes, senators gave the tribunes a great deal of power, and unsurprisingly, the tribunes began to feel obligated to the Senate. As the tribunes and the senators grew closer, plebeian senators were often able to secure the tribunate for members of their own families. In time, the tribunate became a stepping stone to higher office.

During the era of the kingdom, the Roman King appointed new senators through a process called lectio senatus, but after the overthrow of the kingdom, the consuls acquired this power. Around the middle of the 4th century BC, however, the Plebeian Assembly enacted the "Ovinian Plebiscite" (plebiscitum Ovinium), which gave the power to appoint new senators to the Roman censors. It also codified a commonplace practice, which all but required the censor to appoint any newly elected magistrate to the Senate. While this was not an absolute requirement, the language in the law was so strict that the censors rarely disobeyed it. It is not known what year this law was passed, although it was probably passed between the opening of the censorship to plebeians (in 339 BC) and the first known lectio senatus by a censor (in 312 BC). By this point, plebeians were already holding a significant number of magisterial offices, and so the number of plebeian senators probably increased quickly. It was, in all likelihood, simply a matter of time before the plebeians came to dominate the Senate.

Under the new system, newly elected magistrates were awarded with automatic membership in the Senate, although it remained difficult for a plebeian from an unknown family to enter the Senate. On the rare occasion that an individual of an unknown family (ignobilis) was elected to high office, it was usually due to the unusual character of that individual, as was the case for both Gaius Marius and Marcus Tullius Cicero. Several factors made it difficult for individuals from unknown families to be elected to high office, in particular the very presence of a long-standing nobility, as this appealed to the deeply rooted Roman respect for the past. In addition, elections were expensive, neither senators nor magistrates were paid, and the Senate often did not reimburse magistrates for expenses associated with their official duties. Therefore, an individual usually had to be independently wealthy before seeking high office. Ultimately, a new patricio-plebeian aristocracy (nobilitas) emerged, which replaced the old patrician nobility. It was the dominance of the long-standing patrician nobility which ultimately forced the plebeians to wage their long struggle for political power. The new nobility, however, was fundamentally different from the old nobility. The old nobility existed through the force of law, because only patricians were allowed to stand for high office, and it was ultimately overthrown after those laws were changed. Now, however, the new nobility existed due to the organization of society, and as such, it could only be overthrown through a revolution.

The Conflict of the Orders was finally coming to an end, since the plebeians had achieved political equality with the patricians. A small number of plebeian families had achieved the same standing that the old aristocratic Patrician families had always had, but these new plebeian aristocrats were as uninterested in the plight of the average plebeian as the old patrician aristocrats had always been. During this time period, the plebeian plight had been mitigated due to the constant state of war that Rome was in. These wars provided employment, income, and glory for the average plebeian, and the sense of patriotism that resulted from these wars also eliminated any real threat of plebeian unrest. The lex Publilia, which had required the election of at least one plebeian censor every five years, contained another provision. Before this time, any bill passed by an assembly could only become a law after the patrician senators gave their approval. This approval came in the form of an auctoritas patrum ("authority of the fathers"). The lex Publilia modified this process, requiring the auctoritas patrum to be passed before a law could be voted on by one of the assemblies, rather than after the law had already been voted on. It is not known why, but this modification seems to have made the auctoritas patrum irrelevant.

By 287 BC, the economic condition of the average plebeian had become poor. The problem appears to have centered around widespread indebtedness, and the plebeians quickly demanded relief. The senators, most of whom belonged to the creditor class, refused to abide by the demands of the plebeians, and the result was the final plebeian secession. The Plebeians seceded to the Janiculum Hill, and to end the secession, a dictator named Quintus Hortensius was appointed. Hortensius, a plebeian, passed the lex Hortensia which ended the requirement that an auctoritas patrum be passed before any bill could be considered by either the Plebeian Council or the Tribal Assembly. The requirement was not changed for the Centuriate Assembly. The Hortensian Law also reaffirmed the principle that an act of the Plebeian Council have the full force of law over both plebeians and patricians, which it had originally acquired as early as 449 BC. The importance of the Hortensian law was in that it removed from the patrician senators their final check over the Plebeian Council.

== Historicity ==
The traditional account was long accepted as factual, but it has a number of problems and inconsistencies, and almost every element of the story is controversial today. For instance, the fasti report a number of consuls with plebeian names during the 5th century BC, when the consulate was supposedly only open to patricians, and explanations to the effect that previously patrician gentes somehow became plebeians later are difficult to prove. Another point of difficulty is the apparent absence of armed revolt; as the history of the late Republic shows, similar types of grievances tended to lead to bloodshed rather quickly, yet Livy's account seems to entail debate mostly, with the occasional threat of secessio. None of this is helped by our basic uncertainty as to who the plebs actually were; many of them are known to have been wealthy landowners, and the "lower class" label dates from the late Republic.

Some scholars, such as Richard E. Mitchell, have even argued that there was no conflict at all, the Romans of the late Republic having interpreted events of their distant past as if they were comparable to the class struggles of their own time. The crux of the problem is that there is no contemporaneous account of the conflict; writers such as Polybius, who might have met persons whose grandparents participated in the conflict, do not mention it (which may not be surprising, since Polybius' history covered a period after the conflict), while the writers who do speak of the conflict, such as Livy or Cicero, are sometimes thought to have reported fact and fable equally readily, and sometimes assume that there were no fundamental changes in Roman institutions in nearly 500 years.

== See also ==
- Roman Kingdom
- Roman Republic
- Roman Empire
- Roman Law
- Plebeian Council
- Centuria
- Curia
- Roman consul
- Praetor
- Roman censor
- Quaestor
- Aedile
- Roman Dictator
- Master of the Horse
- Senate
- Cursus honorum
- Pontifex Maximus
- Princeps senatus
- Interrex
- Procurator
- Acta Senatus
