= Plebiscitum Ovinium =

Ancient Roman law

The Plebiscitum Ovinium (often called the Lex Ovinia) was an initiative by the Plebeian Council that transferred the power to revise the list of members of the Roman Senate (the lectio senatus) from consuls to censors.

== Date ==
Since Appius Claudius Caecus is said to have changed the membership of the senate during his censorship in 312 BCE, the law must have been passed by then, but not much earlier because the censors of 319 removed a man from his tribe, but not from the Senate.

== Reaction ==
The patricians did not recognize the validity of the Plebiscitum Ovinium, but nevertheless did not attempt to prevent the lectio senatus being carried out by the censors rather than the consuls.

== See also ==
- Conflict of the Orders
- Ovinia gens
