= Cursus honorum =

Sequential order of public offices held by politicians in Ancient Rome

The cursus honorum (Latin for 'course of honors', or more colloquially 'ladder of offices'; Latin: [ˈkʊrsʊs hɔˈnoːrũː]) was the sequential order of public offices held by aspiring politicians in the Roman Republic and the early Roman Empire. It was designed for men of senatorial rank. The cursus honorum comprised a mixture of military and political administration posts; the ultimate prize for winning election to each "rung" in the sequence was to become one of the two consuls in a given year.

These rules were altered and flagrantly ignored in the course of the last century of the Republic. For example, Gaius Marius held consulships for five years in a row between 104 and 100 BC. He was consul seven times in all, also serving in 107 and 86. Officially presented as opportunities for public service, the offices often became mere opportunities for self-aggrandizement. The constitutional reforms of Sulla between 82 and 79 BC required a ten-year interval before holding the same office again for another term.

To have held each office at the youngest possible age (suo anno, 'in his year') was considered a great political success. For instance, to miss out on a praetorship at 39 meant that one could not become consul at 42. Cicero expressed extreme pride not only in being a novus homo ('new man'; comparable to a "self-made man") who became consul even though none of his ancestors had ever served as a consul, but also in having become consul "in his year".

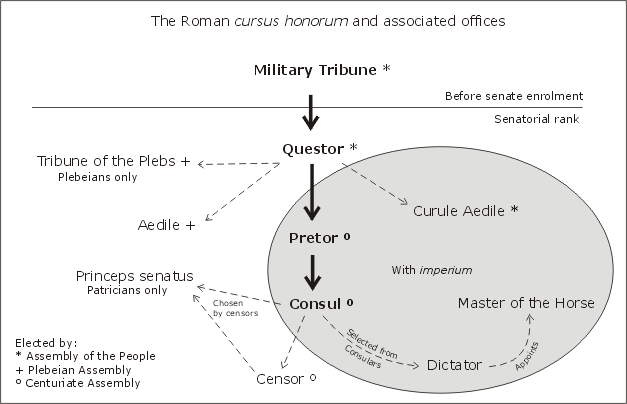
The Roman cursus honorum

== Military service ==
Prior to entering political life and the cursus honorum, a young man of senatorial rank was expected to serve around ten years of military duty for the Senate. The years of service were intended to be mandatory in order to qualify for political office.

Advancement and honors would improve his political prospects, and a successful military career might culminate in the office of military tribune, to which 24 men were elected by the Tribal Assembly each year. The rank of military tribune is sometimes described as the first office of the cursus honorum.

== Quaestor ==
The first official post was that of quaestor. Ever since the reforms of Sulla, candidates had to be at least 30 years old to hold the office. From the time of Augustus onwards, twenty quaestors served in the financial administration at Rome or as second-in-command to a governor in the provinces. They could also serve as the paymaster for a legion.

== Aedile ==
At 36 years of age, a promagistrate could stand for election to one of the aediles (pronounced /ˈiːdaɪl/ EE-dyle, from aedes, "temple edifice") positions. Of these aediles, two were plebeian and two were patrician, with the patrician aediles called curule aediles. The plebeian aediles were elected by the Plebeian Council and the curule aediles were either elected by the Tribal Assembly or appointed by the reigning consul. The aediles had administrative responsibilities in Rome. They had to take care of the temples (whence their title, from the Latin aedes, "temple"), organize games, and be responsible for the maintenance of the public buildings in Rome. Moreover, they took charge of Rome's water and food supplies; in their capacity as market superintendents, they served sometimes as judges in mercantile affairs.

The aedile was the supervisor of public works; the words "edifice" and "edification" stem from the same root. He oversaw the public works, temples and markets. Therefore, the aediles would have been in some cooperation with the current censors, who had similar or related duties. Also, they oversaw the organization of festivals and games (ludi), which made this a very sought-after office for a career minded politician of the late Republic, as it was a good means of gaining popularity by staging spectacles.

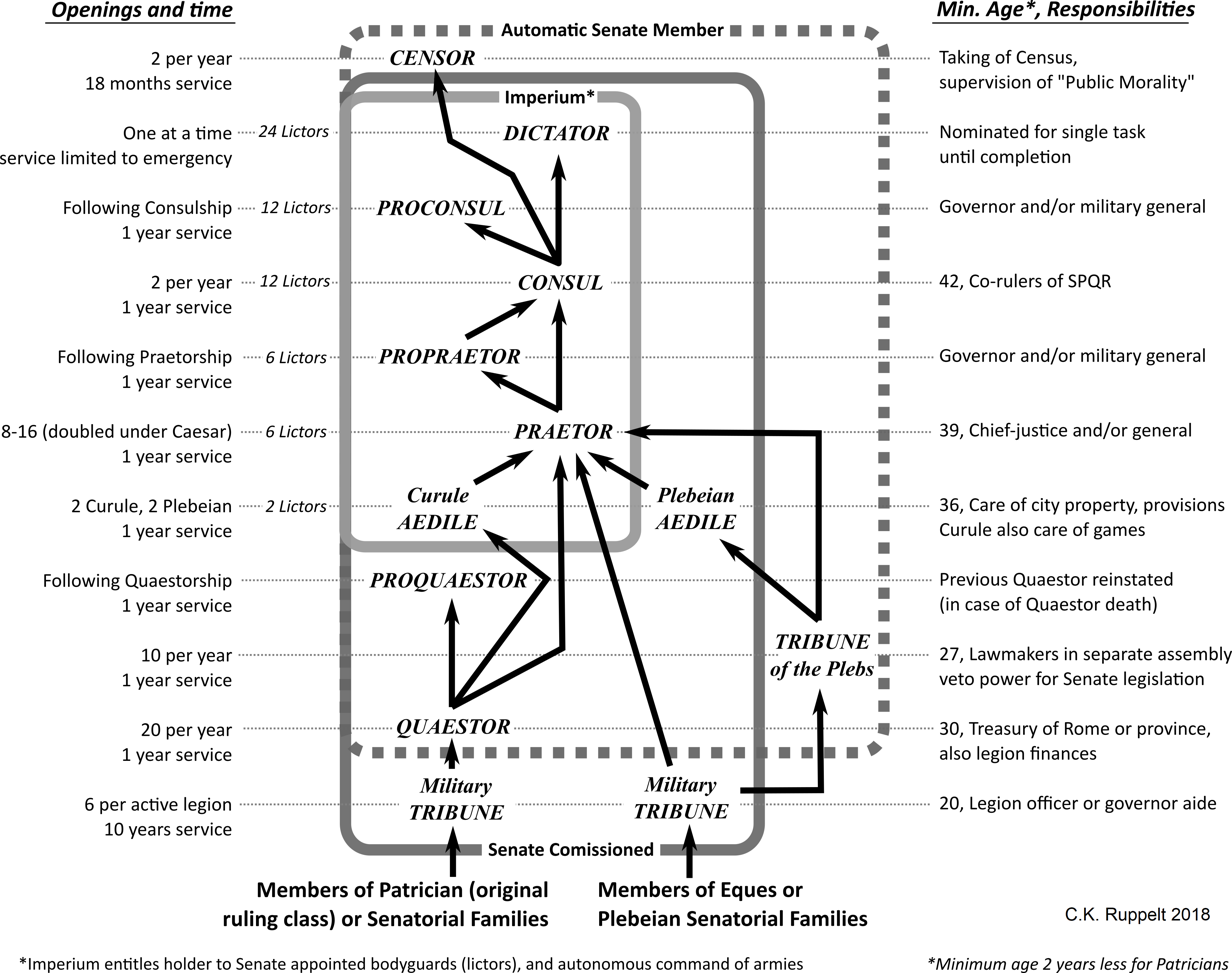
Cursus honorum as during Julius Caesar's career (1st century BC)

Curule aediles were added at a later date in the 4th century BC; their duties do not differ substantially from plebeian aediles. However, unlike plebeian aediles, curule aediles were allowed certain symbols of rank—the sella curulis or curule chair, for example—and only patricians could stand for election to curule aedile. This later changed, and both plebeians and patricians could stand for curule aedileship.

The elections for curule aedile were at first alternated between patricians and plebeians, until late in the 2nd century BC, when the practice was abandoned and both classes became free to run during all years.

While part of the cursus honorum, this step was optional and not required to hold future offices. Though the office was usually held after the quaestorship and before the praetorship, there are some cases with former praetors serving as aediles.

== Praetor ==
After serving either as quaestor or as aedile, a man of 39 years could run for praetor. During the reign of Augustus this requirement was lowered to 30, at the request of Gaius Maecenas. The number of praetors elected varied through history, generally increasing with time. During the republic, six or eight were generally elected each year to serve judicial functions throughout Rome and other governmental responsibilities. In the absence of the consuls, a praetor would be given command of the garrison in Rome or in Italy. Also, a praetor could exercise the functions of the consuls throughout Rome, but their main function was that of a judge. They would preside over trials involving criminal acts, grant court orders and validate "illegal" acts as acts of administering justice. A praetor was escorted by six lictors, and wielded imperium. After a term as praetor, the magistrate could serve as a provincial governor with the title of propraetor, wielding propraetor imperium, commanding the province's legions, and possessing ultimate authority within his province(s).

During the Roman Republic era, when the praetors were governing both Roman citizens and peregrini, the two praetors were divided into two roles. The first was the Praetor Peregrinus, who was the chief judge in trials involving one or more foreigners. The other was the Praetor Urbanus, the chief judicial office in Rome for Roman citizens. If one of these two praetors was tasked to head an army and was absent from Rome, the other praetor would perform their duties in their absence.

== Consul ==
The office of consul was the most prestigious of all of the offices on the cursus honorum, and represented the summit of a successful career. The minimum age was 42. Years were identified by the names of the two consuls elected for a particular year; for instance, M. Messalla et M. Pisone consulibus, "in the consulship of Messalla and Piso", dates an event to 61 BC. Consuls were responsible for the city's political agenda, commanded large-scale armies and controlled important provinces. The consuls served for only a year (a restriction intended to limit the amassing of power by individuals) and could only rule when they agreed, because each consul could veto the other's decision.

The consuls would alternate monthly as the chairman of the Senate. They also were the supreme commanders in the Roman army, with each being granted two legions during their consular year. Consuls also exercised the highest juridical power in the Republic, being the only office with the power to override the decisions of the Praetor Urbanus. Only laws and the decrees of the Senate or the People's assembly limited their powers, and only the veto of a fellow consul or a tribune of the plebs could supersede their decisions.

A consul was escorted by twelve lictors, held imperium and wore the toga praetexta. Because the consul was the highest executive office within the Republic, they had the power to veto any action or proposal by any other magistrate, save that of the Tribune of the Plebs. After a consulship, a consul was assigned one of the more important provinces and acted as the governor in the same way that a propraetor did, only owning proconsular imperium. A second consulship could only be attempted after an interval of 10 years to prevent one man holding too much power, though there have been exceptions to this rule, notably Gaius Marius in the late 2nd century BC.

== Governor ==
Although not part of the cursus honorum, upon completing a term as either praetor or consul, an officer was required to serve a term as propraetor and proconsul, respectively, in one of Rome's many provinces. These propraetors and proconsuls held near autocratic authority within their selected province or provinces. Because each governor held equal imperium to the equivalent magistrate, they were escorted by the same number of lictors (12) and could only be vetoed by a reigning consul or praetor. Their abilities to govern were only limited by the decrees of the Senate or the people's assemblies, and the Tribune of the Plebs was unable to veto their acts as long as the governor remained at least a mile outside of Rome.

== Censor ==
After a term as consul, the final step in the cursus honorum was the office of censor. This was the only office in the Roman Republic whose term was a period of eighteen months instead of the usual twelve. Censors were elected every five years and although the office held no military imperium, it was considered a great honour. The censors took a regular census of the people and then apportioned the citizens into voting classes on the basis of income and tribal affiliation. The censors enrolled new citizens in tribes and voting classes as well. The censors were also in charge of the membership roll of the Senate, every five years adding new senators who had been elected to the requisite offices. Censors could also remove unworthy members from the Senate. This ability was lost during the dictatorship of Sulla. Censors were also responsible for construction of public buildings and the moral status of the city.

Censors also had financial duties, in that they had to put out to tender projects that were to be financed by the state. Also, the censors were in charge of the leasing out of conquered land for public use and auction. Though this office owned no imperium, meaning no lictors for protection, they were allowed to wear the toga praetexta.

== Tribune of the Plebs ==
The office of Tribune of the Plebs was an important step in the political career of plebeians. Patricians could not hold the office. They were not an official step in the cursus honorum. The Tribune was an office first created to protect the right of the common man in Roman politics and served as the head of the Plebeian Council. In the mid-to-late Republic, however, plebeians were often just as, and sometimes more, wealthy and powerful than patricians. Those who held the office were granted sacrosanctity (legal protection from any physical harm), the power to rescue any plebeian from the hands of a patrician magistrate, and the right to veto any act or proposal of any magistrate, including another Tribune of the Plebs and the consuls. The tribune also had the power to exercise capital punishment against any person who interfered in the performance of his duties. The tribunes could even convene a Senate meeting and lay legislation before it and arrest magistrates. Their houses had to remain open for visitors even during the night, and they were not allowed to be more than a day's journey from Rome. Due to their unique power of sacrosanctity, the Tribune had no need for lictors for protection and owned no imperium, nor could they wear the toga praetexta. For a period after Sulla's reforms, a person who had held the office of Tribune of the Plebs could no longer qualify for any other office, and the powers of the tribunes were more limited, but these restrictions were subsequently lifted.

== Princeps senatus ==
Another office not officially a step in the cursus honorum was the princeps senatus, an extremely prestigious office for a patrician. The princeps senatus served as the leader of the Senate and was chosen to serve a five-year term by each pair of Censors every five years. Censors could, however, confirm a princeps senatus for a period of another five years. The princeps senatus was chosen from all Patricians who had served as a Consul, with former Censors usually holding the office. The office originally granted the holder the ability to speak first at session on the topic presented by the presiding magistrate, but eventually gained the power to open and close the senate sessions, decide the agenda, decide where the session should take place, impose order and other rules of the session, meet in the name of the senate with embassies of foreign countries, and write in the name of the senate letters and dispatches. This office, like the Tribune, did not own imperium, was not escorted by lictors, and could not wear the toga praetexta.

== Dictator and magister equitum ==
Of all the offices within the Roman Republic, none granted as much power and authority as the position of dictator, known as the Master of the People. In times of emergency, the Senate would declare that a dictator was required, and the current consuls would appoint a dictator. This was the only decision that could not be vetoed by the Tribune of the Plebs. The dictator was the sole exception to the Roman legal principles of having multiple magistrates in the same office and being legally able to be held to answer for actions in office. Essentially by definition, only one dictator could serve at a time, and no dictator could ever be held legally responsible for any action during his time in office for any reason.

The dictator was the highest magistrate in degree of imperium and was attended by twenty-four lictors (as were the former Kings of Rome). Although his term lasted only six months instead of twelve (except for the Dictatorships of Sulla and Caesar), all other magistrates reported to the dictator (except for the tribunes of the plebs – although they could not veto any of the dictator's acts), granting the dictator absolute authority in both civil and military matters throughout the Republic. The dictator was free from the control of the Senate in all that he did, could execute anyone without a trial for any reason, and could ignore any law in the performance of his duties. The dictator was the sole magistrate under the Republic that was truly independent in discharging his duties. All of the other offices were extensions of the Senate's executive authority and thus answerable to the Senate. Since the dictator exercised his own authority, he did not suffer this limitation, which was the cornerstone of the office's power.

When a dictator entered office, he appointed to serve as his second-in-command a magister equitum, the Master of the Horse, whose office ceased to exist once the dictator left office. The magister equitum held praetorian imperium, was attended by six lictors, and was charged with assisting the dictator in managing the State. When the dictator was away from Rome, the magister equitum usually remained behind to administer the city. The magister equitum, like the dictator, had unchallengeable authority in all civil and military affairs, with his decisions only being overturned by the dictator himself.

The dictatorship was definitively abolished in 44 BC after the assassination of Gaius Julius Caesar (Lex Antonia).

== See also ==
- Outline of ancient Rome – overview of and topical guide to ancient Rome
- Political institutions of ancient Rome – lists of political institutions of ancient Rome
- Roman Senate – political institution in ancient Rome
- Vigintisexviri – college of minor magistrates of the Roman Republic
- Tres militiae – the equestrian order version of the cursus honorum
