= Lex Hortensia =

Ancient Roman law

The lex Hortensia, also sometimes referred to as the Hortensian law, was a law passed in Ancient Rome in 287 BC which made all resolutions passed by the Plebeian Council, known as plebiscita, binding on all citizens. It was passed by the dictator Quintus Hortensius in a compromise to bring the plebeians back from their secession to the Janiculum.

It was the final result of the long struggle between patricians and plebeians, where the plebeians would periodically secede from the city in protest (secessio plebis) when they felt they were deprived of their rights. The law contained similar stipulations of the two earlier laws, the lex Valeria-Horatia of 449 BC and lex Publilia of 339 BC. Unlike the prior two laws, however, lex Hortensia eliminated the requirement that the Senate ratify, in the case of the lex Valeria-Horatia, or give its prior approval to, in the case of the lex Publilia, plebiscites before becoming binding on all citizens. Its passage secured the end of the Conflict of the Orders, and secured theoretically equal political rights between patricians and plebeians.

== Causes ==
In the annalistic tradition, around the year 287 BC, a plebeian dictator by the name of Hortensius was appointed to handle a civil uprising that eventually led to the secession of the plebs to the Janiculum hill; only after the passage of the lex Hortensia in the Centuriate Assembly, or comitia centuriata, did the plebs return to the city. The annals attribute the cause of the uprising to debt problems, with the proximate cause being the call to arms to fight against the Lucanians, giving the plebeians more leverage in depriving the patricians of needed manpower in the war.

However, there is considerable reason to doubt this story, which Livy attributes to urban rabble in the forum, as large masses of urban poor did not really exist in the middle Republic. Furthermore, rural landowners controlled the vast majority of the votes in the Plebeian Council (Latin: concilium plebis), as they controlled 29 of the voting blocs that never numbered more than 35, since the Council was organised in the same way as the Tribal Assembly (Latin: comitia tributa), just with the exclusion of patricians. The more likely cause is therefore the desire of rural plebeians to control the distribution of public lands (Latin: ager publicus) won in the Third Samnite War.

Due to the extreme measures taken by the consuls, however, it is likely that considerable urban unrest predicated this reform. With both the urban and the rural sections of the populace clamouring for reform and the military necessities of manpower granting the plebs a strong negotiating position, the law entered the realm of the inevitable. Of course, necessary to pass such specific and controlling legislation was an organised movement, likely coordinated by the plebeian tribunes in the city.

== Provisions ==
The lex Hortensia was a step in a series of reforms that secured political freedom for the plebs. In the early Republic, before the start of reforms, laws passed by the Plebeian Council applied not to all Romans, but only to plebeians, because only plebeians could vote in the council. But after the lex Valeria-Horatia in 449 BC, plebiscites could become binding to all Romans, and not just plebeians, but only if they were ratified by the Senate. However, after the passage of lex Pubilia, the ratification of laws was moved to before the passage of the bill in the concilium plebis, which apparently reduced the chance of senatorial obstruction.

Furthermore, the law created restrictions on when votes could be scheduled. For example, votes could no longer be held on market days, which could have interfered in economic business. However, this served as an impediment towards the participation of rural plebeians in the concilium plebis, as they were then unable to vote on convenient days when they would have been in the city.

As a question of legal semantics, there remained a difference between a plebiscitum, a plebeian law, and a lex, a law per se. The lex Hortensia simply changed the recognition of the plebiscitum such that it was treated as if it were a lex. Later, as the distinction became immaterial, all binding laws, formerly leges or plebiscita, became referred to leges as well.

== Legacy ==
The passage of the Hortensian law ended a significant chapter in the Conflict of the Orders, a centuries long political conflict between the plebs and the patricians. It also cemented the pre-eminence of the Tribal Assembly and the Plebeian Council in legislation, with primarily minor and procedural laws passed in the late Republic. The law cemented the authority of the Roman people, making plebeians and their tribunes important political players, which previous laws had failed to do.

== See also ==
- Roman law
- List of Roman laws
- Leges Valeriae et Horatiae (449 BC)
- Lex Canuleia (445 BC)
- Leges Liciniae Sextiae (367 BC)
- Lex Publilia (250 BC)
- Lex Ogulnia (300 BC)
- Crisis of the Roman Republic
