= Acta Senatus =

Minutes of the Roman Senate

Acta Senatus, or Commentarii Senatus, were minutes of the discussions and decisions of the Roman Senate. Before the first consulship of Julius Caesar (59 BC), minutes of the proceedings of the Senate were written and occasionally published, but unofficially; Caesar first ordered them to be recorded and issued authoritatively in the Acta Diurna. The keeping of them was continued by Augustus, but their publication was forbidden. A young senator (Latin: ab actis senatus) was chosen to draw up these acta, which were kept in the imperial archives and public libraries. Special permission from the city prefect was necessary in order to examine them.
