= Quintus Hortensius (dictator) =

Quintus Hortensius was an ancient Roman, appointed to the office of dictator in the year 287 BC.

When the people, pressed by their patrician creditors, "seceded" to the Janiculum, Hortensius was made dictator to put an end to the strife. He passed a law (known as the Lex Hortensia) whereby the resolutions of the plebeian assembly (plebiscita) were made binding on all the citizens, without the approval of the Senate being necessary. This was not a mere re-enactment of previous laws. Another law, passed about the same time, which declared the nundinae (market days) to be dies fasti (days on which legal business might be transacted), is also attributed to him.

He is said to have died while still in office, making him one of two dictators of the Roman Republic to die in office in history, the other being Julius Caesar.

== Sources ==
- Aulus Gellius xv. 27
- Pliny, Nat. Hist. xvi. 15
- Macrobius, Saturnalia i. 16
- Livy, Epit. ii.
