= History of the Constitution of the Roman Republic =

The history of the Constitution of the Roman Republic is a study of the ancient Roman Republic that traces the progression of Roman political development from the founding of the Roman Republic in 509 BC until the founding of the Roman Empire in 27 BC. The constitutional history of the Roman Republic can be divided into five phases. The first phase began with the revolution which overthrew the Roman Kingdom in 509 BC, and the final phase ended with the revolution which overthrew the Roman Republic, and thus created the Roman Empire, in 27 BC. Throughout the history of the Republic, the constitutional evolution was driven by the struggle between the aristocracy and the ordinary citizens.

The Roman aristocracy was composed of a class of citizens called Patricians (Latin: patricii), while all other citizens were called Plebeians (Latin: plebs) . During the first phase of political development, the Patrician aristocracy dominated the state, and the Plebeians began seeking political rights. During the second phase, the Plebeians completely overthrew the Patrician aristocracy, and since the aristocracy was overthrown simply through alterations to the Roman law, this revolution was not violent. The third phase saw the emergence of a joint Patricio-Plebeian aristocracy, along with a dangerous military situation that helped to maintain internal stability within the Republic. The fourth phase began shortly after Rome's wars of expansion had ended, because without these wars, the factor that had ensured internal stability was removed. While the Plebeians sought to address their economic misfortune through the enactment of laws, the underlying problems were ultimately caused by the organization of society. The final phase began when Julius Caesar crossed the Rubicon river, and ended with the complete overthrow of the Republic. This final revolution triggered a wholesale reorganization of the constitution, and with it, the emergence of the Roman Empire.

== The Patrician era (509–367 BC) ==
According to legend, the Roman Kingdom was founded in 753 BC, and was ruled by a succession of seven kings. The last king, Lucius Tarquinius Superbus, ruled in a tyrannical manner and, in 510 BC, his son Sextus Tarquinius raped a noblewoman named Lucretia. Lucretia, the wife of a senator named Lucius Tarquinius Collatinus, committed suicide because of the rape, and this led to a conspiracy which drove Tarquin from the city. With Tarquin's expulsion, the Roman Republic was founded, and the chief conspirators, Collatinus and the senator Lucius Junius Brutus, were elected as the first Roman consuls (i.e. chief-executives). While this story may be nothing more than a legend which later Romans created in order to explain their past, it is likely that Rome had been ruled by a series of kings, who probably were, as the legends suggest, overthrown quickly.

=== The executive magistrates ===
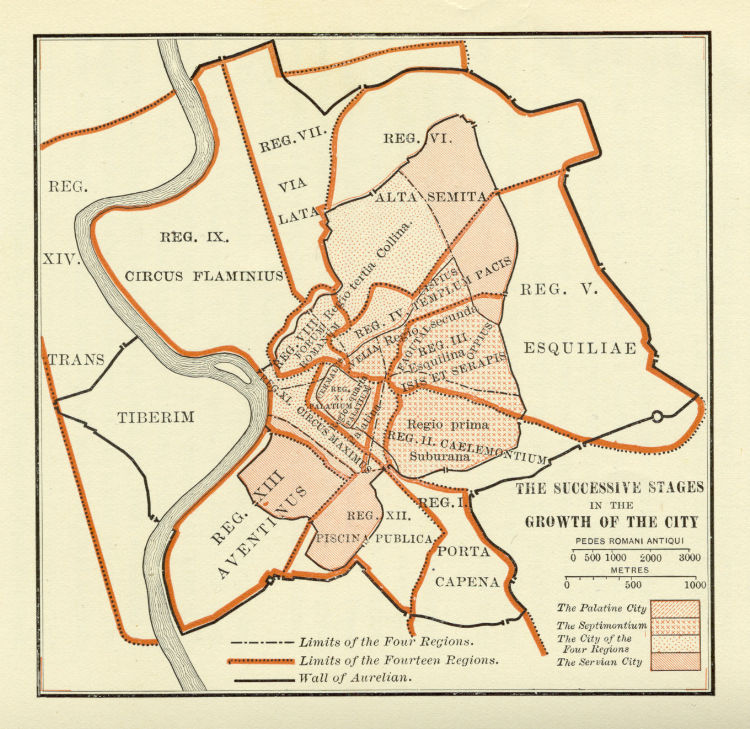
Growth of the city region during the kingdom

The constitutional changes which occurred immediately after the revolution were probably not as extensive as the legends suggest, as the most important constitutional change probably concerned the chief executive. Before the revolution, a king (rex) was elected by the senators (patres or "fathers") for a life term, but now two praetores ("leaders") were elected by the citizens for an annual term. These magistrates were eventually called "consuls" (Latin for those who walk together), and each consul checked his colleague, while their limited term in office opened them up to prosecution if they abused the powers of their office. The chief executive was still vested with the same grade of imperium ("command") powers as was the old king, and the powers of each of the two consuls, when exercised together, were no different than were those of the old king. In the immediate aftermath of the revolution, the Roman Senate and the Roman assemblies were nearly as powerless as they had been under the monarchy.

During the years of the monarchy, only Patricians (patres or "fathers") were admitted to the Senate. The revolution of 510 BC so depleted the ranks of the Senate, however, that a group of Plebeians were drafted (conscripti) to fill the vacancies. The old Senate of Patricians (patres) transitioned into a Senate of patres et conscripti ("fathers and conscripted men"). These new Plebeian senators, however, could neither vote on an auctoritas patrum ("authority of the fathers" or "authority of the Patrician senators"), nor be elected interrex. In the year 494 BC, the city was at war, but the Plebeian soldiers refused to march against the enemy, and instead seceded to the Aventine Hill. The Patricians quickly became desperate to end what was, in effect, a labor strike, and thus they quickly agreed to the demands of the Plebeians, that they be given the right to elect their own officials. The Plebeians named these new officials Plebeian Tribunes (tribuni plebis), and gave them two assistants, the Plebeian Aediles (aediles plebi).

During the early years of the Republic, the Plebeians were not allowed to hold ordinary political office. In 445 BC, the Plebeians demanded the right to stand for election to the consulship, but the senate refused to grant them this right. After a long resistance to the new demands, the Senate (454) sent a commission of three patricians to Greece to study and report on the legislation of Solon and other lawmakers. When they returned, the Assembly (451) chose ten men – decemviri – to formulate a new code, and gave them supreme governmental power in Rome for two years. This commission, under the presidency of a resolute reactionary, Appius Claudius, transformed the old customary law of Rome into the famous Twelve Tables, submitted them to the Assembly (which passed them with some changes), and displayed them in the Forum for all who would and could to read. The Twelve Tables recognised certain rights and gave the plebs their own representatives, the tribunes. However, the Consulship remained closed to the Plebeians. Consular command authority (imperium) was granted to a select number of military tribunes. These individuals, the so-called consular tribunes, were elected by the Centuriate Assembly, and the senate had the power to veto any such election. This was the first of many attempts by the Plebeians to achieve political equality with the Patricians. Starting around the year 400 BC, a series of wars were fought, and while the Patrician aristocracy enjoyed the fruits of the resulting conquests, the Plebeians in the army became exhausted and bitter. They demanded real concessions, and so in 367 BC a law was passed (the "Licinio-Sextian law") which dealt with the economic plight of the Plebeians. However, the law also required the election of at least one Plebeian Consul each year. The opening of the Consulship to the Plebeians was probably the cause behind the concession of 366 BC, in which the Praetorship and Curule Aedileship were both created, but opened only to Patricians.

=== The Senate and legislative assemblies ===
Shortly after the founding of the Republic, the Centuriate Assembly became the principle Roman assembly in which magistrates were elected, laws were passed, and trials occurred. During his consulship in 509 BC, Publius Valerius Publicola enacted a law (the lex Valeria) which guaranteed due process rights to every Roman citizen. Any condemned citizen could evoke his right of Provocatio, which appealed any condemnation to the Centuriate Assembly, and which was a precursor to habeas corpus. Also around this time, the Plebeians assembled into an informal Plebeian Curiate Assembly, which was the original Plebeian Council. Since they were organized on the basis of the Curia (and thus by clan), they remained dependent on their Patrician patrons. In 471 BC, a law was passed due to the efforts of the Tribune Volero Publilius, which allowed the Plebeians to organize by Tribe, rather than by Curia. Thus, the Plebeian Curiate Assembly became the Plebeian Tribal Assembly, and the Plebeians became politically independent.

During the Roman Kingdom, the king nominated two quaestors to serve as his assistants, and after the overthrow of the monarchy, the consuls retained this authority. However, in 447 BC, Cicero recorded that the quaestors began to be elected by a tribal assembly that was presided over by a magistrate. It seems as though this was the first instance of a joint Patricio-Plebeian Tribal Assembly, and thus was probably an enormous gain for the Plebeians. While Patricians were able to vote in a joint assembly, there were never very many Patricians in Rome. Thus, most of the electors were Plebeians, and yet any magistrate elected by a joint assembly had jurisdiction over both Plebeians and Patricians. Therefore, for the first time, the Plebeians seemed to have indirectly acquired authority over Patricians. During the 4th century BC, a series of reforms were passed (the leges Valeriae Horatiae), which ultimately required that any law passed by the Plebeian Council have the full force of law over both Plebeians and Patricians. This gave the plebeian tribunes, who presided over the Plebeian Council, a positive character for the first time. Before these laws were passed, tribunes could only interpose the sacrosanctity of their person (intercessio) to veto acts of the Senate, assemblies, or magistrates. It was a modification to the Valerian law in 449 BC which first allowed acts of the Plebeian Council to have the full force of law, but eventually the final law in the series was passed (the "Hortensian Law"), which removed the last check that the Patricians in the senate had over this power.

== The Conflict of the Orders (367–287 BC) ==
In the decades following the passage of the Licinio-Sextian law of 367 BC, which required the election of at least one plebeian consul each year, a series of laws were passed which ultimately granted Plebeians political equality with Patricians. The Patrician era came to a complete end in 287 BC, with the passage of the Hortensian law. This era was also marked with significant external developments. Up until 295 BC, the Samnites and the Celts had been Rome's chief rivals, but that year, at the Battle of Sentinum, the Romans defeated the combined armies of the Samnites and the Celts. This battle was followed by the complete submission of both the Samnites and the Celts to the Romans, and the emergence of Rome as the unchallenged mistress of Italy.

=== The Plebeians and the magistrates ===
When the Curule Aedileship had been created, it had only been opened to Patricians. Eventually, however, Plebeians won full admission to the Curule Aedileship. In addition, after the Consulship had been opened to the Plebeians, the Plebeians acquired a de facto right to hold both the Roman Dictatorship and the Roman Censorship (which had been created in 443 BC) since only former Consuls could hold either office. 356 BC saw the appointment of the first Plebeian Dictator, and in 339 BC the Plebeians facilitated the passage of a law (the lex Publilia), which required the election of at least one Plebeian Censor for each five-year term. In 337 BC, the first Plebeian Praetor was elected.

In 342 BC, two significant laws were passed. One of these two laws made it illegal to hold more than one office at any given point in time, and the other law required an interval of ten years to pass before any magistrate could seek re-election to any office. As a result of these two laws, the military situation quickly became unmanageable. During this time period, Rome was expanding within Italy and beginning to take steps beyond Italy, and thus it became necessary for military commanders to hold office for several years at a time. This problem was resolved with the creation of the pro-magisterial offices, so that when an individual's term in office ended, his command might be prorogued (prorogatio imperii). In effect, when a magistrate's term ended, his imperium was extended, and he usually held the title of either Proconsul or Propraetor. This constitutional device was not in harmony with the underlying genius of the Roman constitution, and its frequent usage eventually paved the way for the empire. In addition, during these years, the Plebeian Tribunes and the senators grew increasingly close. The senate realized the need to use Plebeian officials to accomplish desired goals, and so to win over the Tribunes, the senators gave the Tribunes a great deal of power, and unsurprisingly, the Tribunes began to feel obligated to the senate. As the Tribunes and the senators grew closer, Plebeian senators were often able to secure the Tribunate for members of their own families. In time, the Tribunate became a stepping stone to higher office.

=== The Ovinian law and the new aristocracy ===
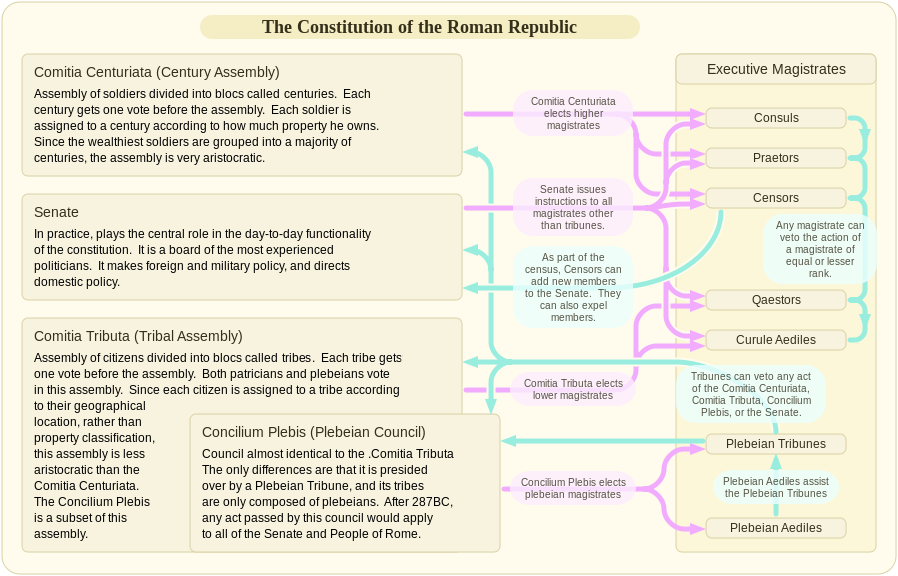
Chart showing the checks and balances of the Constitution of the Roman Republic.

During the era of the kingdom, the Roman King appointed new senators, but after the overthrow of the kingdom, the Consuls acquired this power. Around the middle of the 4th century BC, however, the Plebeian Council enacted the "Ovinian Plebiscite" (plebiscitum Ovinium), which gave the power to appoint new senators to the Roman Censors. It also codified a commonplace practice, which all but required the Censor to appoint any newly elected magistrate to the senate. By this point, Plebeians were already holding a significant number of magisterial offices, and so the number of Plebeian senators probably increased quickly. It was, in all likelihood, simply a matter of time before the Plebeians came to dominate the senate.

Under the new system, newly elected magistrates were awarded with automatic membership in the senate, although it remained difficult for a Plebeian from an unknown family to enter the senate. Several factors made it difficult for individuals from unknown families to be elected to high office, in particular the very presence of a long-standing nobility, as this appealed to the deeply rooted Roman respect for the past. Ultimately, a new Patricio-Plebeian aristocracy emerged, which replaced the old Patrician nobility. It was the dominance of the long-standing Patrician nobility which ultimately forced the Plebeians to wage their long struggle for political power. The new nobility, however, was fundamentally different from the old nobility. The old nobility existed through the force of law, because only Patricians were allowed to stand for high office, and it was ultimately overthrown after those laws were changed. Now, however, the new nobility existed due to the organization of society, and as such, it could only be overthrown through a revolution.

=== The failure of the Conflict of the Orders ===
The Conflict of the Orders was finally coming to an end, since the Plebeians had achieved political equality with the Patricians. A small number of Plebeian families had achieved the same standing that the old aristocratic Patrician families had always had, but these new Plebeian aristocrats were as uninterested in the plight of the average Plebeian as the old Patrician aristocrats had always been. During this time period, the Plebeian plight had been mitigated due to the constant state of war that Rome was in. These wars provided employment, income, and glory for the average Plebeian, and the sense of patriotism that resulted from these wars also eliminated any real threat of Plebeian unrest. The lex Publilia, which had required the election of at least one Plebeian Censor every five years, contained another provision. Before this time, any bill passed by an assembly (either by the Plebeian Council, the Tribal Assembly, or the Centuriate Assembly) could only become a law after the Patrician senators gave their approval. This approval came in the form of an auctoritas patrum ("authority of the fathers" or "authority of the Patrician senators"). The lex Publilia modified this process, requiring the auctoritas patrum to be passed before a law could be voted on by one of the assemblies, rather than after the law had already been voted on. It is not known why, but this modification seems to have made the auctoritas patrum irrelevant.

By 287 BC, the economic condition of the average Plebeian had become poor, and the result was the final Plebeian secession. The Plebeians seceded to the Janiculum hill, and to end the secession, a Dictator named Quintus Hortensius was appointed. Hortensius, a Plebeian, passed a law called the "Hortensian Law" (Lex Hortensia), which ended the requirement that an auctoritas patrum be passed before any bill could be considered by either the Plebeian Council or the Tribal Assembly. The requirement was not changed for the Centuriate Assembly. The importance of the Hortensian Law was in that it removed from the senate its final check over the Plebeian Council (the principal popular assembly). It should therefore not be viewed as the final triumph of democracy over aristocracy, since, through the Tribunes, the senate could still control the Plebeian Council. Thus, the ultimate significance of this law was in the fact that it robbed the Patricians of their final weapon over the Plebeians. The result was that the ultimate control over the state fell, not onto the shoulders of democracy, but onto the shoulders of the new Patricio-Plebeian aristocracy.

== The supremacy of the new nobility (287–133 BC) ==
The great accomplishment of the Hortensian Law was in that it deprived the Patricians of their final weapon over the Plebeians. Therefore, the new Patricio-Plebeian aristocracy replaced the old Patrician aristocracy, and the last great political question of the earlier era had been resolved. As such, no important political changes occurred between 287 BC and 133 BC. This entire era was dominated by foreign wars, which eliminated the need to address the flaws in the current political system, since the patriotism of the Plebeians suppressed their desire for further reforms. However, this era created new problems, which began to be realized near the end of the 2nd century BC. For example, the nature of Rome's military commanders changed. Roman soldiers of earlier eras fought short wars, and then returned to their farms. Since their generals did the same thing, the soldiers came to view their generals as being nothing more than fellow citizen-soldiers. Now, however, wars were becoming longer and of a larger scale. Thus, this period saw a growing affinity between the average citizen and his general, while the generals acquired more power than they had ever held before.

=== The Senate ===
When the lex Hortensia was enacted into law, Rome theoretically became a democracy (insofar as the landowners were concerned, anyway). In reality, however, Rome remained an oligarchy, since the critical laws were still enacted by the Roman Senate. In effect, democracy was satisfied with the possession of power, but did not care to actually use it. The Senate was supreme during this era because the era was dominated by foreign policy. While upwards of 300,000 citizens were eligible to vote, many of these individuals lived a great distance from Rome, and so calling them all together in a short period of time was impossible. The foreign affairs questions often required quick answers, and 300 senators were more capable of quick action than were thousands of electors. The questions were also more complex than were the questions of the earlier era, and the average citizen was not adequately informed as to these issues. The senators, in contrast, were usually quite experienced, and the fact that they had income sources that were independent of their political roles made it easier for them to involve themselves in policy questions over extended periods of time.

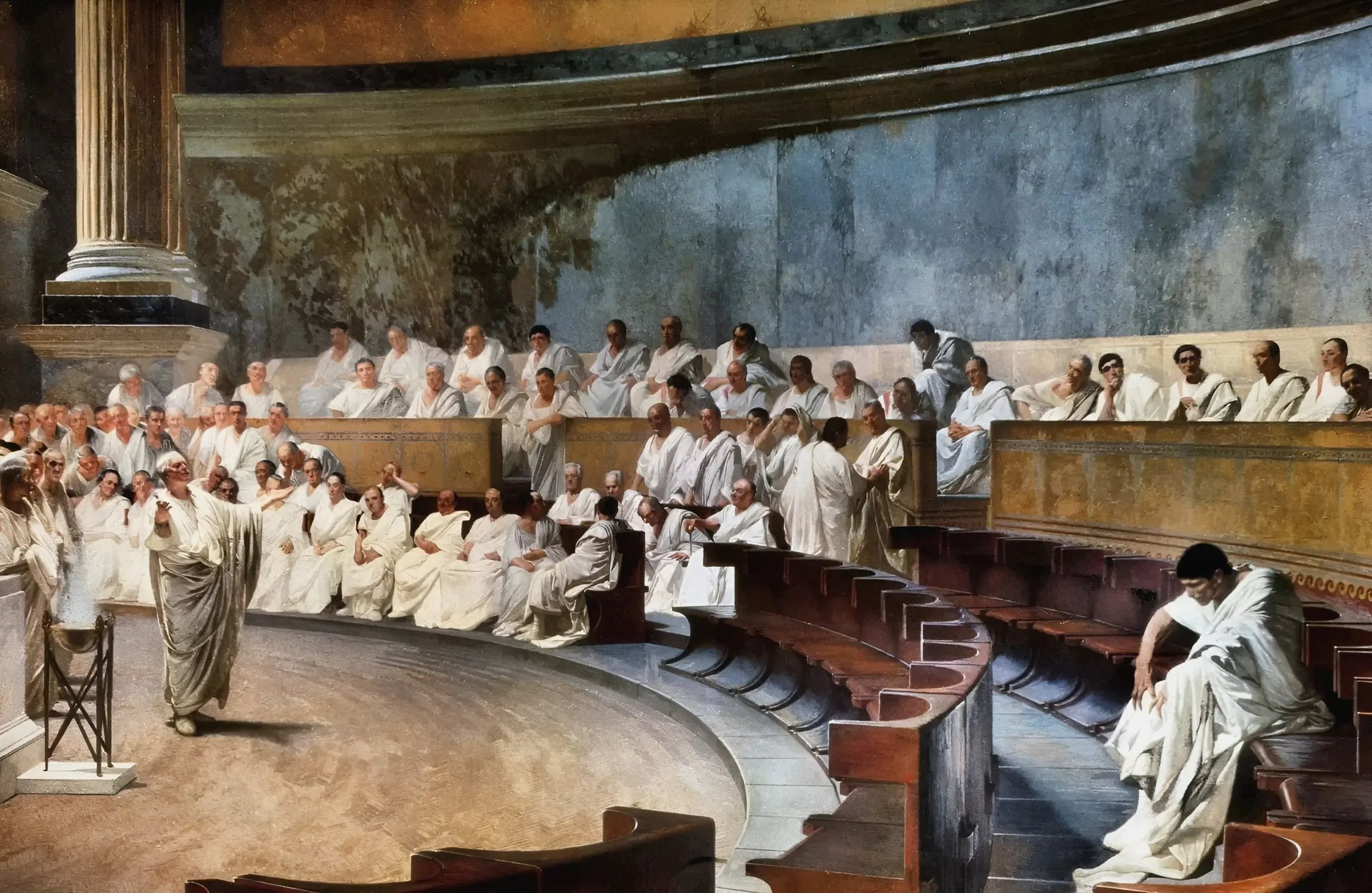
Modern representation of a sitting of the Roman Senate

Since most senators were former magistrates, the Senate became bound together by a strong sense of collegiality. At any given point in time, many of the Senate's most senior members were ex-consuls, which facilitated the creation of a bond between the presiding consul and those senior members. In addition, the consul was always chosen from Senate, and as such he usually held similar ideals as did his fellow senators. When his annual term ended, he returned to their ranks, and so he was unlikely to stand against his fellow senators. Before the enactment of the Ovinian Law, consuls appointed new senators, but after the enactment of this law, censors appointed new senators, which caused the senate to become even more independent of the presiding consul. In addition, the Ovinian Law all but required that ex-magistrates be appointed to the Senate, and as such, the process by which censors appointed new members to the Senate became quite objective. This further enhanced the competence, and thus the prestige, of the Senate.

=== The Plebeians and the aristocracy ===
The final decades of this era saw a worsening economic situation for many Plebeians. The long military campaigns had forced citizens to leave their farms, which often caused those farms to fall into a state of disrepair. This situation was made worse during the Second Punic War, when Hannibal fought the Romans throughout Italy, and the Romans adopted a strategy of attrition and guerrilla warfare in response. When the soldiers returned from the battlefield, they often had to sell their farms to pay their debts, and the landed aristocracy quickly bought these farms at discounted prices. The wars had also brought to Rome a great surplus of inexpensive slave labor, which the landed aristocrats used to staff their new farms. Soon the masses of unemployed Plebeians began to flood into Rome, and into the ranks of the legislative assemblies.

At the same time, the aristocracy was becoming extremely rich. Several Italian towns had sided with Hannibal during the Second Punic War, and these towns were ultimately punished for their disloyalty, which opened up even more cheap farmland for the aristocrats. With the destruction of Rome's great commercial rival of Carthage, even more opportunities for profit became available. With so many new territories, tax collection (which had always been outsourced to private individuals) also became extremely profitable. While the aristocrats spent their time exploiting new opportunities for profit, Rome was conquering new civilizations in the east. These civilizations were often highly developed, and as such they opened up a world of luxury to the Romans. Up until this point, most Romans had only known a simple life, but as both wealth and eastern luxuries became available at the same time, an era of ruinous decadence followed. The sums that were spent on these luxuries had no precedent in prior Roman history. Several laws were enacted to stem this tide of decadence, but these laws had no effect, and attempts by the censors to mitigate this decadence were equally futile.

By the end of this era, Rome had become full of unemployed Plebeians. They then began filling the ranks of the assemblies, and the fact that they were no longer away from Rome made it easier for them to vote. In the principle legislative assembly, the Plebeian Council, any individual voted in the tribe that his ancestors had belonged to. Thus, most of these newly unemployed Plebeians belonged to one of the thirty-one rural tribes, rather than one of the four urban tribes, and the unemployed Plebeians soon acquired so much political power that the Plebeian Council became highly populist. These Plebeians were often angry with the aristocracy, which further exacerbated the class tensions. Their economic state usually led them to vote for the candidate who offered the most for them, or at least for the candidate whose games or whose bribes were the most magnificent. The fact that they were usually uninformed as to the issues before them didn't matter, because they usually sold their votes to the highest bidder anyway. Bribery became such a problem that major reforms were ultimately passed, in particular the requirement that all votes be by secret ballot. A new culture of dependency was emerging, which would look to any populist leader for relief.

== From the Gracchi to Caesar (133–49 BC) ==
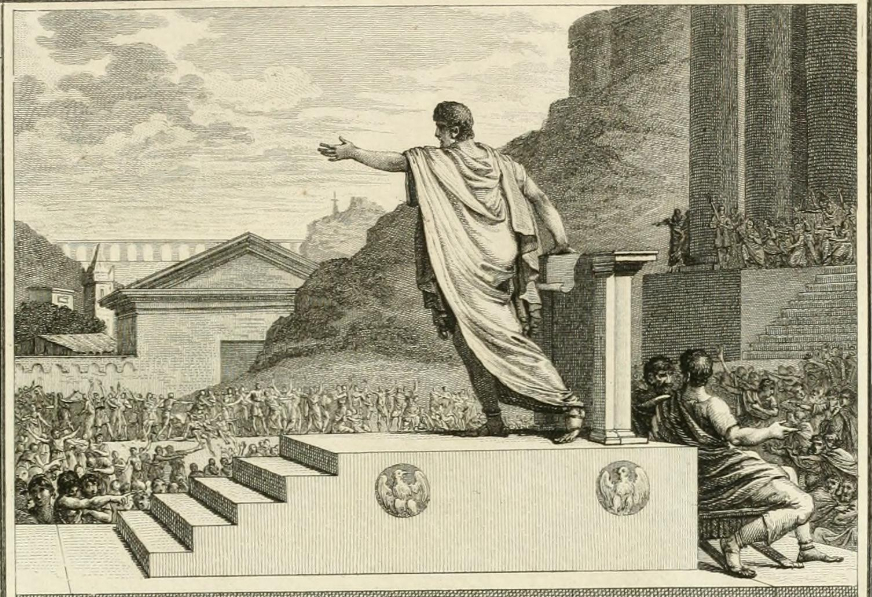
Gaius Gracchus, Tribune of the people, presiding over the Plebeian Council

The prior era saw great military successes, and great economic failures, while the patriotism of the Plebeians had kept them from seeking any new reforms. Now, however, the military situation had stabilized, and fewer soldiers were needed. This, in conjunction with the new slaves that were being imported from abroad, inflamed the unemployment situation further. The flood of unemployed citizens to Rome had made the assemblies quite populist, and thus had created an increasingly aggressive democracy. This new era began with the Tribunate of Gaius Gracchus, and ended when Julius Caesar crossed the Rubicon river.

=== Tiberius and Gaius Gracchus ===
Tiberius Gracchus was elected plebeian tribune in 133 BC, and as tribune, he attempted to enact a law that would have distributed land amongst Rome's landless citizens. The aristocrats, who stood to lose an enormous amount of money, were bitterly opposed to this proposal. Tiberius submitted this law to the Plebeian Council, but the law was vetoed by a tribune named Marcus Octavius, and so Tiberius used the Plebeian Council to impeach Octavius. The theory that a representative of the people ceases to be one when he acts against the wishes of the people, was repugnant to the genius of Roman constitutional theory. If carried to its logical end, this theory removed all constitutional restraints on the popular will, and put the state under the absolute control of a temporary popular majority. This theory ultimately found its logical end under the future democratic empire of the military populist Julius Caesar. The law was enacted, but Tiberius was murdered when he stood for re-election to the tribunate. The ten years that followed his death were politically inactive. The only important development was in the growing strength of the democratic opposition to the aristocracy.

Tiberius' brother Gaius was elected plebeian tribune in 123 BC. Gaius Gracchus' ultimate goal was to weaken the Senate and to strengthen the democratic forces, so he first enacted a law which put the knights (equites, or upper-middle class citizens) on the jury courts instead of the senators. He then passed a grain law which greatly disadvantaged the provincial governors, most of whom were senators. The knights, on the other hand, stood to profit greatly from these grain reforms, and so the result was that Gaius managed to turn the most powerful class of non-senators against the Senate. In the past, the Senate eliminated political rivals either by establishing special judicial commissions or by passing a senatus consultum ultimum ("ultimate decree of the Senate"). Both devices allowed the Senate to bypass the ordinary due process rights that all citizens had. Gaius outlawed the judicial commissions, and declared the senatus consultum ultimum to be unconstitutional. Gaius then proposed a law which granted citizenship rights to Rome's Italian allies, but the selfish democracy in Rome, which jealously guarded its privileged status, deserted him over this proposal. He stood for re-election to a third term in 121 BC, but was defeated and then murdered. The democracy, however, had finally realized how weak the Senate had become.

=== Sulla's Constitutional Reforms ===
Several years later, a new power had emerged in Asia. In 88 BC, a Roman army was sent to put down that power, king Mithridates VI of Pontus, but was defeated. Over the objections of the former Consul Gaius Marius, the Consul for the year, Lucius Cornelius Sulla was ordered by the senate to assume command of the war against Mithridates. Marius, a member of the democratic ("populare") party, had a Tribune revoke Sulla's command of the war against Mithridates, so Sulla, a member of the aristocratic ("optimate") party, brought his army back to Italy and marched on Rome. Marius fled, and his supporters either fled or were murdered by Sulla. Sulla had become so angry at Marius' Tribune that he passed a law that was intended to permanently weaken the Tribunate. He then returned to his war against Mithridates, and with Sulla gone, the populares under Marius and Lucius Cornelius Cinna soon took control of the city. The populare record was not one to be proud of, as they had re-elected Marius Consul several times without observing the required ten-year interval. They also transgressed democracy by advancing unelected individuals to magisterial office, and by substituting magisterial edicts for popular legislation. Sulla soon made peace with Mithridates, and in 83 BC, he returned to Rome, overcame all resistance, and captured the city again. Sulla and his supporters then slaughtered most of Marius' supporters, although one such supporter, a 17-year-old populare (and the son-in-law of Cinna) named Julius Caesar, was ultimately spared.

Sulla, who had observed the violent results of radical populare reforms (in particular those under Marius and Cinna), was naturally conservative, and so his conservatism was more reactionary than it was visionary. As such, he sought to strengthen the aristocracy, and thus the senate. After being appointed Roman Dictator in 82 BC, he enacted a series of constitutional reforms. He resigned the Dictatorship in 80 BC, retired in 79 BC, and died a year later. While he thought that he had firmly established aristocratic rule, his own career had illustrated the fatal weaknesses in the constitution. Ultimately, it was the army, and not the senate, which dictated the fortunes of the state.

In 77 BC, the senate sent one of Sulla's former lieutenants, Gnaeus Pompey Magnus, to put down an uprising in Spain. By 71 BC, Pompey returned to Rome after having completed his mission, and around the same time, another of Sulla's former lieutenants, Marcus Licinius Crassus, had just put down a slave revolt in Italy. Upon their return, Pompey and Crassus found the populare party fiercely attacking Sulla's constitution, and so they attempted to forge an agreement with the populare party. If both Pompey and Crassus were elected Consul in 70 BC, they would dismantle the more obnoxious components of Sulla's constitution. The promise of both Pompey and Crassus, aided by the presence of both of their armies outside of the gates of Rome, helped to 'persuade' the populares to elect the two to the Consulship. As soon as they were elected, they dismantled most of Sulla's constitution.

=== The First Triumvirate ===
In 62 BC, Pompey returned victorious from Asia, but the senate refused to ratify the arrangements that he had made with his soldiers. Pompey, in effect, became powerless, and thus when Julius Caesar returned from his governorship in Spain in 61 BC, he found it easy to make an arrangement with Pompey. Caesar and Pompey, along with Crassus, established a private agreement, known as the First Triumvirate. Under the agreement, Pompey's arrangements in Asia were to be ratified, and his soldiers were to be given land. Caesar was to be elected Consul in 59 BC, and then serve as governor of Gaul for five years. Crassus was to be promised a future Consulship.

Caesar became Consul in 59 BC, but his colleague, Marcus Calpurnius Bibulus, was an extreme aristocrat. Caesar submitted the laws that he had promised Pompey to the Roman Senate, but the senate rejected these laws, and so he then submitted them to the assemblies. Bibulus attempted to obstruct the enactment of these laws, and so Caesar used violent (and thus illegal) means to ensure their passage. Caesar was then given command of four legions, and promised the governorship of three provinces (Cisalpine Gaul, Transalpine Gaul, and Illyricum). This appointment was to begin on March 1, 59 BC, while he was still Consul. Caesar did not wish to leave the senate in the hands of such unskilful politicians as Pompey and Crassus before he had crushed the spirit of the senate and deprived it of its two most dangerous leaders, Cato and Cicero. Therefore, he sent Cato on a mission to Cyprus, which was likely to ruin his reputation, and then facilitated the election of the former Patrician, Publius Clodius Pulcher, to the Tribunate for 58 BC. Clodius, a dangerous demagogue, secured the passage of several laws for his coming attack on Cicero. One law banned the use of omens (auspices) as an obstructive device in the Plebeian Council, while the second law made certain "clubs" of a "semi-political nature" (i.e. armed gangs) lawful. Clodius then passed two laws which banished Cicero, on the grounds that he had deprived several of Catiline's conspirators of their due process (provocatio) rights when he had them executed upon a mere decree of the senate.

Pompey and Crassus proved themselves to be as incompetent as Caesar had hoped. Clodius terrorized the city with his armed gangs, and agitated Pompey to such a degree that Pompey was able to secure the passage of a law in 57 BC which recalled Cicero from his exile. This was more of a triumph for the senate than it was for Pompey, however, since Pompey was allied with Caesar. Pompey was so inept that the senate decided to override him, and rescind the land laws that Caesar had passed in 59 BC for Pompey's veterans. This forced a renewal of the triumvirate: Pompey and Crassus were promised the Consulship in 55 BC and Caesar's term as governor was extended for five years. Caesar's daughter, and Pompey's wife, Julia, soon died in childbirth, and a year later, Crassus was killed during his invasion of the Parthian Empire. These two events severed the last remaining bond between Pompey and Caesar.

Beginning in the summer of 54 BC, a wave of political corruption and violence swept Rome. This chaos reached a climax in January 52 BC, when Clodius was murdered in a gang war. In addition, the civil unrest had caused the calendar to become neglected. The calendar required annual adjustments to prevent its drift relative to any Spring Equinox, and so to correct the misalignment of the calendar, an intercalary month was inserted at the end of February 52 BC, and Pompey was elected sole Consul for that month. This elevation to extraordinary power was the last straw for Caesar, and with Crassus dead, Pompey was looking for any excuse with which to crush Caesar, and establish himself as the master of the state. On January 1, 49 BC, an agent of Caesar named Gaius Scribonius Curio presented an ultimatum to the senate, but the ultimatum was rejected, and the senate then passed a resolution which declared that if Caesar did not lay down his arms by July of that year, that he would be acting adversus rem publicam (in effect, declaring him to be an enemy of the republic). On January 7, 49 BC, the senate passed a senatus consultum ultimum, which suspended civil government and declared something analogous to martial law. Pompey, in effect, was vested with Dictatorial powers, but his army was composed largely of untested conscripts. Caesar then crossed the Rubicon river with his veteran army, and marched towards Rome. Caesar's rapid advance forced Pompey, the Consuls and the senate to abandon Rome for Greece, and Caesar entered the city unopposed.

== The period of transition (49–27 BC) ==
The era that began when Julius Caesar crossed the Rubicon in 49 BC, and ended when Octavian returned to Rome after the Battle of Actium in 29 BC, can be divided into two distinct units. The dividing line between these two units is the assassination of Caesar in March 44 BC, although from a constitutional standpoint, there was no clear dividing line between these two periods. The forces which had supported Pompey during the early part of the first period were allied against Mark Antony and Octavian in 43 BC and 42 BC, and the constitutional means through which Caesar had held power before his assassination were used by Antony and Octavian to hold power after Caesar's assassination. From a constitutional standpoint, it makes no difference whether an autocrat holds the title of Roman Dictator, as Caesar had done, or of Triumvir, as Antony and Octavian had done. From a constitutional perspective, these twenty years formed a single unit, through which the constitutional evolution of the prior century accelerated at a rapid pace. By 27 BC, Rome had completed its transition from being a city-state with a network of dependencies, to being the capital of a world empire.

=== Julius Caesar's constitutional reforms ===
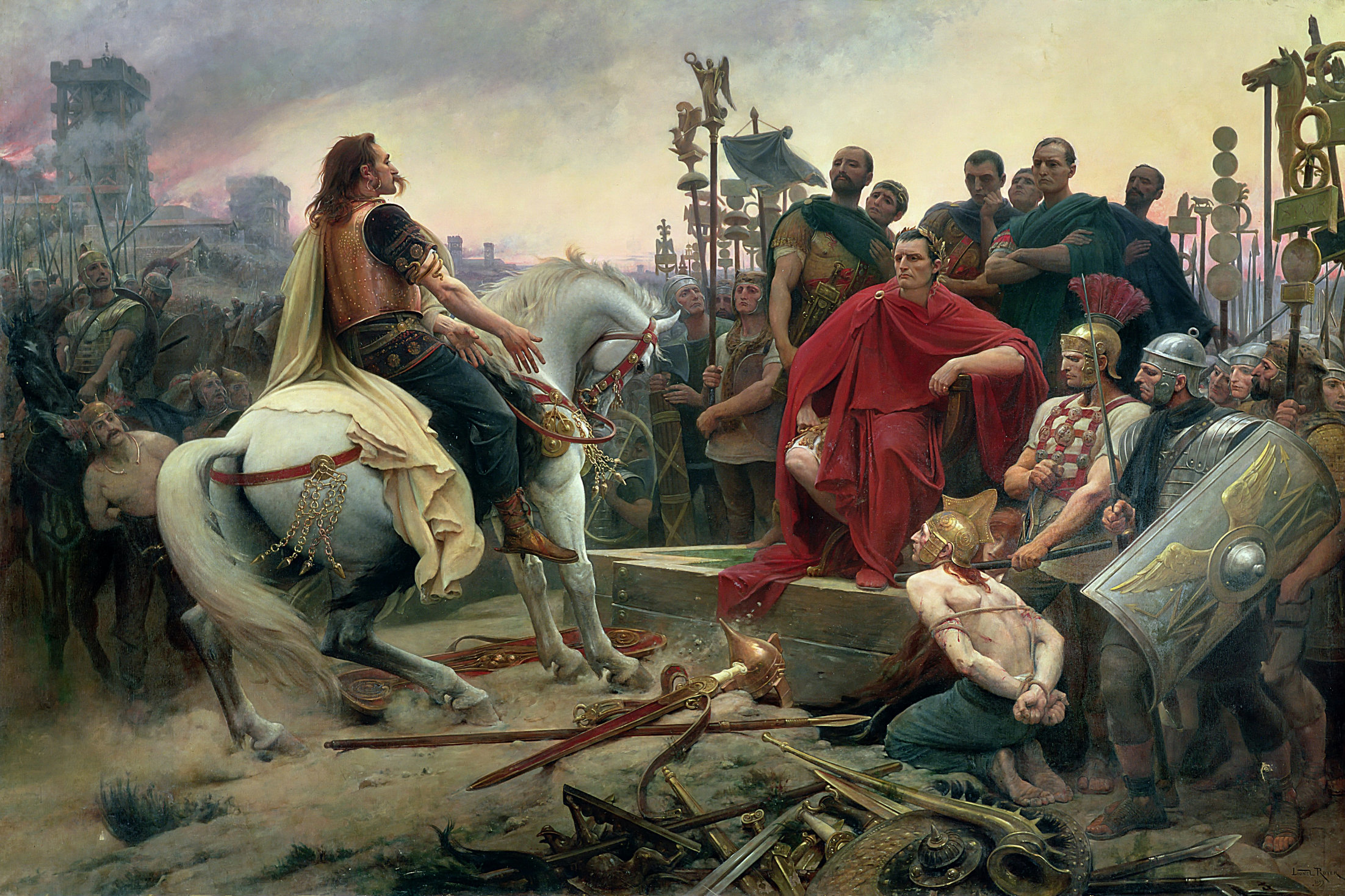
Julius Caesar, accepting the surrender of Vercingetorix, was the final Dictator of the Roman Republic

During his early career, Caesar had seen how chaotic and dysfunctional the Roman Republic had become. The republican machinery had broken down under the weight of imperialism, the central government had become powerless, the provinces had been transformed into independent principalities under the absolute control of their governors, and the army had replaced the constitution as the means of accomplishing political goals. Between his crossing of the Rubicon in 49 BC, and his assassination in 44 BC, Caesar established a new constitution, which was intended to accomplish three separate goals. First, he wanted to suppress all armed resistance out in the provinces, and thus bring order back to the empire. Second, he wanted to create a strong central government in Rome. And finally, he wanted to knit together the entire empire into a single cohesive unit.

Caesar held both the dictatorship and the plebeian tribunate, but alternated between the consulship and the proconsulship. His powers within the state seem to have rested upon these magistracies. The dictatorship of Caesar was fundamentally different from the dictatorship of the early and middle Republic, as he held the office for life, rather than for six months, and he also held certain judicial powers which the ordinary dictators had not held. In 48 BC, Caesar was given permanent tribunician powers, which made his person sacrosanct, allowed him to veto the Roman Senate, and allowed him to dominate the Plebeian Council. Since Tribunes were always elected by the Plebeian Council, Caesar had hoped to prevent the election of Tribunes who might oppose him. In 46 BC, Caesar gave himself the title of "Prefect of the Morals" (praefectura morum), which was an office that was new only in name, as its powers were identical to those of the censors. Thus, he could hold censorial powers, while technically not subjecting himself to the same checks that the ordinary censors were subject to, and he used these powers to fill the senate with his own partisans. He also set the precedent, which his imperial successors followed, of requiring the senate to bestow various titles and honours upon him. Coins bore his likeness, and he was given the right to speak first during Senate meetings.

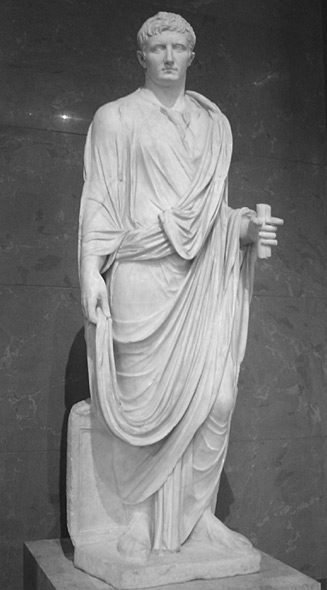
Augustus as a magistrate; the statue's marble head was made c. 30–20 BC, the body sculpted in the 2nd century AD

Caesar then increased the number of magistrates who were elected each year, which created a large pool of experienced magistrates, and allowed Caesar to reward his supporters. Caesar even took steps to transform Italy into a province, and to more tightly link the other provinces of the empire into a single, cohesive unit. This process, of ossifying the entire Roman Empire into a single unit, rather than maintaining it as a network of unequal principalities, would ultimately be completed by Caesar's successor, the emperor Augustus. When Caesar returned to Rome in 47 BC, he raised the Senate's membership to 900. While the Roman assemblies continued to meet, Caesar submitted all candidates to the assemblies for election, and all bills to the assemblies for enactment, which caused the assemblies to become powerless and unable to oppose him. To minimize the risk that another general might attempt to challenge him, Caesar passed a law which subjected governors to term limits. Near the end of his life, Caesar began to prepare for a war against the Parthian Empire. Since his absence from Rome might limit his ability to install his own consuls, he passed a law which allowed him to appoint all magistrates in 43 BC, and all consuls and tribunes in 42 BC. This, in effect, transformed the magistrates from being representatives of the people to being representatives of the dictator, and robbed the popular assemblies of much of their remaining influence.

=== Caesar's assassination and the Second Triumvirate ===
Caesar was assassinated in March 44 BC. The motives of the conspirators were both personal, as well as political. Many of Caesar's ultimate assassins were envious of him, and dissatisfied with the recognition that they had received from him. Most of the conspirators were senators, and many of them were angry about the fact that he had deprived the Senate of much of its power and prestige. They were also angry that, while they had received few honours, Caesar had been given many honours. There were also rumours that he was going to make himself king, and transfer the seat of government to Alexandria. The grievances that they held against him were vague, and as such, their plan against him was vague. The fact that their motives were vague, and that they had no idea of what to do after his assassination, both were plainly obvious by the subsequent course of events.

After Caesar's assassination, Mark Antony, who had been Caesar's Master of the Horse, formed an alliance with Caesar's adopted son and great-nephew, Gaius Octavian. Along with Marcus Aemilius Lepidus, they formed an alliance known as the Second Triumvirate. They held powers that were nearly identical to the powers that Caesar had held under his constitution, and as such, the Senate and assemblies remained powerless. The conspirators were defeated at the Battle of Philippi in 42 BC. Lepidus became powerless, and Antony went to Egypt to seek glory in the east, while Octavian remained in Rome. Eventually, however, Antony and Octavian fought against each other in one last battle. Antony was defeated in the naval Battle of Actium in 31 BC, and committed suicide in 30 BC. In 29 BC, Octavian returned to Rome, as the unchallenged master of the state. In 27 BC, Octavian offered to give up the dictatorial powers which he had held since 42 BC, but the Senate refused, and thus ratified his status as master of the state. He became the first Roman emperor, Augustus, and the transition from Roman Republic to Roman Empire was complete.

== See also ==
- Acta Senatus
- Byzantine Senate
- Centuria
- Cursus honorum
- Interrex
- Pontifex Maximus
- Princeps senatus
- Procurator
- Promagistrate
