= Contio =

Ad hoc public assembly in Ancient Rome

The contio (pl. "contiones"; from Latin "conventio" meaning "gathering") was a common type of public meeting in Ancient Rome, which existed during the monarchy as well as in the Roman Republic and Roman Empire. At the contio, magistrates gave informative or persuasive speeches about political matters. Unlike other public assemblies in Rome, such as the comitia, the contio had no procedural role and was not part of the legislative process per se. The contio served a communicative function, offering magistrates the opportunity to give the people a report about a Senate meeting or give a political speech about a piece of proposed legislation (a rogatio) or an upcoming election, so as to persuade citizens to turn out at the assemblies to vote.

Magistrates also used the contio as a means of self-promotion, presenting themselves as defenders of popular interests and thereby seeking to acquire political support. Contiones could also be held during elections to attract support for political candidates. They served both as a persuasive tool as well as an early kind of get out the vote campaign to get supporters to assembly meetings.

A contio could also be held in the context of the military, with a commander convening his troops to address them for various purposes, including informing them of upcoming movements and operations, presenting awards or punishments, or making a motivational speech before a battle. Since senior Roman magistrates all had significant military experience, the customs of the military and political contiones were similar.

== Function in Roman politics ==
The practice of holding contiones is said to have started under the Roman monarchy, where the king (rex) was the only one who could summon a contio as well as the sole person who had the right to speak at this assembly. Therefore the contio is assumed to have originated earlier than the other public assemblies in Ancient Rome, since voting assemblies did not yet exist under the monarchy.

The procedure and the function of contiones changed in the Republic and Empire. Every magistrate, as well as tribunes of the people, got the right to call a contio and address the crowd, or invite others to give a speech on a topic of the convener's choice. In theory, a contio could be held anytime, on any day. However, contiones were usually held on two specific occasions: after a senate meeting and when a new legislative bill (rogatio) had been proposed.

=== Giving a report after a senate meeting ===
It was a common practice to hold a contio right after a Senate meeting, to inform the public about the matters discussed and the resolutions adopted. The magistrate who presided over the meeting decided who would speak contio. He could choose to address the crowd himself or invite other senators to give a speech. Senators who opposed the proposals adopted often chose to hold their own contio later, to share their different perspective.

Since Senate meetings were always held as a closed session, the contiones were one of the most important ways for Roman citizens to learn about matters of state and get information about political developments.

=== Discussing a bill (rogatio) ===
Contiones were a customary part of the legislative process. Once a rogatio or bill had been endorsed by the Senate it had to be voted on by one of the assemblies. Before the assembly could meet to vote, there was a mandatory notice period, so that news about the upcoming meeting could be distributed. During this time, the proposers of the bill would hold contiones to muster public support for the legislation, expound on the reasons for supporting it, and inspire citizens to attend the assembly to vote in favor. Politicians opposing the proposal might also hold their own contiones to rouse opposing votes.

=== Other occasions ===
The two situations described above were the most common occasions on which a contio was held, but there were several special occasions on which this assembly could be summoned as well:

- On election day, a contio was held to present the list of candidates, inform citizens of the electoral process, and hear final campaign speeches from the candidates.
- Before a census, censors could convene a contio to explain the procedure to the people. After the census they likely presented the new lists of senators and equites to the people through this assembly.
- Successful Roman generals often held a contio on the day after entering the city of Rome and celebrating their triumph, delivering a speech about their campaign and expounding on their military achievements.
- Contiones were summoned when a public execution was held (but not those of women).
- When a new magistrate, such as a consul, entered office, he could choose to use the contio to hold a speech to express his gratitude to the citizens for being elected. Magistrates who left office could call a contio as well, to give the people an overview of their political activities and achievements.
- The contio was used for some religious matters, such as presenting the names of newly appointed augures, vestales and other priests to the people.
- Public funeral speeches (laudationes) in which a magistrate praised a deceased individual on behalf of the community, were held at the contio.

== The audience ==
In theory, every Roman citizen had the right to attend contiones. The crowd at this assembly was seen as a representation of the Roman people (populus) and therefore also referred to by speakers as populus (or quirites). However, it is generally assumed that the audience mainly consisted of citizens living within the city of Rome; since they had easy access to the assemblies which voted on the bills (rogationes) that were the topic of many contiones and were the most likely to attend; getting out the vote for the assemblies was one of the primary goals of most contiones. Residents of the city proper also seem to have been more willing to participate in politics than their fellow citizens from other areas. Over time, two distinct theories about the social disposition of the audiences of most contiones have developed. One theory posits that contiones were mainly attended by lower-class locals, who lived near the forum on which the assembly gathered, while the second theory states that the crowd mainly consisted of well-to-do, high class citizens.

=== Theory 1: Lower-class audience ===
This first theory implies that the largest part of the crowd at every contio consisted of the same group of local shopkeepers who lived near the forum and who sometimes seem to even have closed their businesses to attend a contio. These people, sometimes called the plebs contionalis, would have had the most to gain from the measures that were discussed at the contio, such as grain distributions, and therefore they would have been the most interested to go. According to this theory, these shopkeepers were joined by other lower-class Romans who sought to escape their narrow housing conditions by hanging out in public places such as the forum. Therefore, the majority of the crowd would have consisted of lower-class Romans.

=== Theory 2: Higher-class audience ===
A second major theory states that the audience was mainly made up of wealthy and higher-class Romans. According to this theory, regularly attending contiones would have been easier for these well-to-do individuals, since they had more time to spare than lower-class citizens. Moreover, these higher-class Romans would have had the education that was needed to appreciate and understand the argumentation the magistrates used in their speeches, which sometimes included complicated references to history or law. Lastly, this theory states that this class of citizens would have been the most important for magistrates to influence through contiones, since these wealthy individuals would in turn have influenced the political opinion among lower-class voters through the patron-client relationships omnipresent in Roman society.

== Preserved speeches and other ancient sources ==
Despite the frequency with which contiones were held, very few of the speeches delivered are fully preserved until this day. Many contio speeches are lost or were simply never recorded, either because they did not debate matters of great historical significance or were not considered exemplary demonstrations of rhetorical talent, which was one of the main reasons for preserving a particular speech.

The surviving contio speeches are principally those given by the Late Republican politician and orator Cicero. The table below gives an overview of all of his extant contio speeches.

Preserved contional speeches
Title	Delivered in	Topic
Pro lege Manilia	66 BC	In support of a law proposal by C. Manilius, to assign the command in the war against Mithridates to Pompey.
De lege agraria 2	63 BC	Inaugural speech to the people in Cicero's consular year. Advising against an agrarian law proposed by Rullus, a tribune of the people. (Forms a pair with De Lege Agraria 1 in which he discusses the same topic before the senate.)
De lege agraria 3	63 BC	Short speech on a specific section of the agrarian law discussed in De lege agraria 2.
In Catilinam 2	63 BC	Informing the people that Catiline had fled the city after Cicero had asked him to leave in his senate speech known as In Catilinam 1.
In Catilinam 3	63 BC	Informing the people how evidence for Catiline's conspiracy was found.
Post reditum ad quirites	57 BC	Expressing gratitude to the people after Cicero had been allowed to return to Rome after his exile.
Philippic 4	44 BC	Informing the people of the senate's decision to honor certain individuals, among whom the young Octavian, for the actions they took against Marcus Antonius, interpreting this as a decision to proclaim Antonius a public enemy. (This speech forms a pair with Philippic 3.)
Philippic 6	43 BC	Informing the people of the senate's decision to send an embassy to Marcus Antonius for peace negotiations.

Historiographic works, mainly those of Sallust (a 1st century BC. Roman historiographer) also describe some speeches that have been held at the contio on significant topics in Roman history. Moreover, Cicero comments on contiones in several of his works: in De Oratore, we find some theoretical remarks on how to address this assembly (eg De Oratore 2.333–240) and his letters to Atticus include some references to the contio as well (eg Att. 7.8.5).

== Rhetoric ==
Judging from the surviving ancient source material, speeches delivered at the contio seem to have shared several rhetorical and argumentative characteristics. This list gives an overview of such common characteristics of speeches addressed to this assembly:

- Speakers tried to make the audience feel a sense of responsibility or obligation towards the common good and the welfare of the Republic and the community.
- Speakers flattered the citizens and made them feel politically important, which, in turn, would have increased the sympathy the audience felt towards the magistrate who addressed them.
- Speakers focused on 'persona-creation': burnishing their reputations as defenders of the popular interest on important issues and attacking the motives and behavior of their political opponents.
- Speakers presented themselves as a kind of teacher or guide, eager to inform the public about political happenings. This is called "revelatory rhetoric" and is marked by the frequent use of verbs as "teaching", "warning", "demonstrating" and "explaining" (Latin: docere, monere, ostendere, exponere). This would also have influenced the sympathy of the audience.
- Speakers used the so-called "popularis-style" of rhetoric, which was characterized by many emotional appeals to the audience, for instance evoking fear or resentment, as well as a vehement delivery style, including variations in tone of voice, animated facial expressions and large gestures.
- Speakers used short, sharp phrases, aimed at the crowd, in addition to rhetorical questions, to interact with the audience and to get the crowd to express their support by shouting or cheering.

== Military contiones ==
Aside from the political assembly, a contio could also be convened in the military context, with the commander of an army summoning his troops to assemble to hear a speech. The customs for summoning military contiones were similar to those for the political type; under the monarchy only the king (rex) had the right to do so. Later on, during the Republic, all military commanders summoned contiones. Usually the commander was the only speaker. A military contio could be held on various occasions:

- At the beginning of a campaign, the new commander usually held a contio to present himself to his troops and to inform them of the objectives of the campaign.
- After a successful battle, a contio was held to praise outstanding soldiers and present them with rewards for their achievements.
- When a riot had taken place among the troops, a general could use the contio to announce the punishments the soldiers would get for their rebellious actions.
- Military contiones were used to share orders, edicts and important political affairs with the troops.
- A contio could be summoned right before a battle to motivate and encourage the soldiers.

== Bibliography ==
- Manuwald, Gesine (1 May 2012). "The speeches to the People in Cicero's oratorical corpora". Rhetorica. 30 (2): 153–175. doi:10.1525/RH.2012.30.2.153. ISSN 0734-8584.
- Cicero (2018). Agrarian speeches: introduction, text, translation and commentary. Translated by Manuwald, Gesine. Oxford University Press. ISBN 978-0-19-871540-5. OCLC 982092969.
- Morstein-Marx, Robert (2004). Mass oratory and political power in the late Roman republic. Cambridge University Press. doi:10.1017/cbo9780511482878. ISBN 978-0-521-82327-2.
- Mouritsen, Henrik (2017). Politics in the Roman Republic. Cambridge University Press. doi:10.1017/9781139410861. ISBN 978-1-107-03188-3.
- van der Blom, Henriette (2016). Oratory and political career in the late Roman republic. Cambridge University Press. doi:10.1017/cbo9781107280281. ISBN 978-1-107-05193-5.
- Pina Polo, Francisco (1 December 1995). "Procedures and functions of civil and military contiones in Rome". Klio. 77 (1): 203–216. doi:10.1524/klio.1995.77.jg.203. ISSN 2192-7669.
- Steel, C E W; van der Blom, Henriette, eds. (2013). Community and communication: oratory and politics in republican Rome. Oxford University Press. ISBN 978-0-19-964189-5. OCLC 810946494.
  - Jehne, Martin. "Feeding the plebs with words: the significant of senatorial public oratory in the small world of Roman politics". In Steel & van der Blom (2013), pp. 49–62.
  - Mouritsen, Henrik. "From meeting to text: the contio in the late republic". In Steel & van der Blom (2013), pp. 63–84.
  - Tan, James. "Publius Clodius and the boundaries of the contio". In Steel & van der Blom (2013), pp. 117–32.
- Tan, James (2008). "Contiones in the age of Cicero". Classical Antiquity. 27 (1): 163–201. doi:10.1525/ca.2008.27.1.163. ISSN 0278-6656.
