= Elections in the Roman Republic =

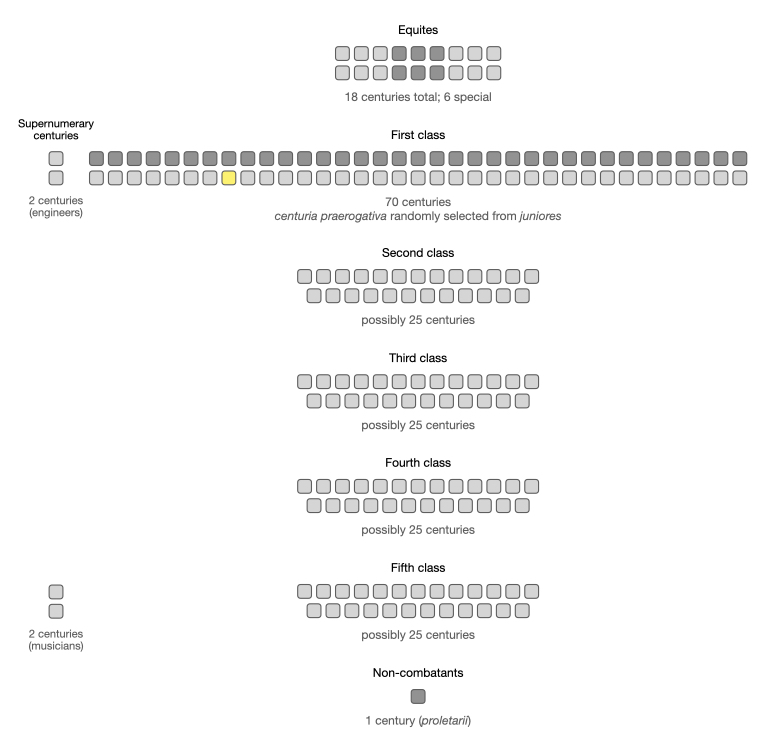
Division of the comitia centuriata per Grieve 1985. The comitia centuriata was reformed some time between 241–16 BC from its Servian form. The number of centuries in the first class fell from 80 to 70. How the second through fifth classes were divided into 100 centuries is not entirely clear.

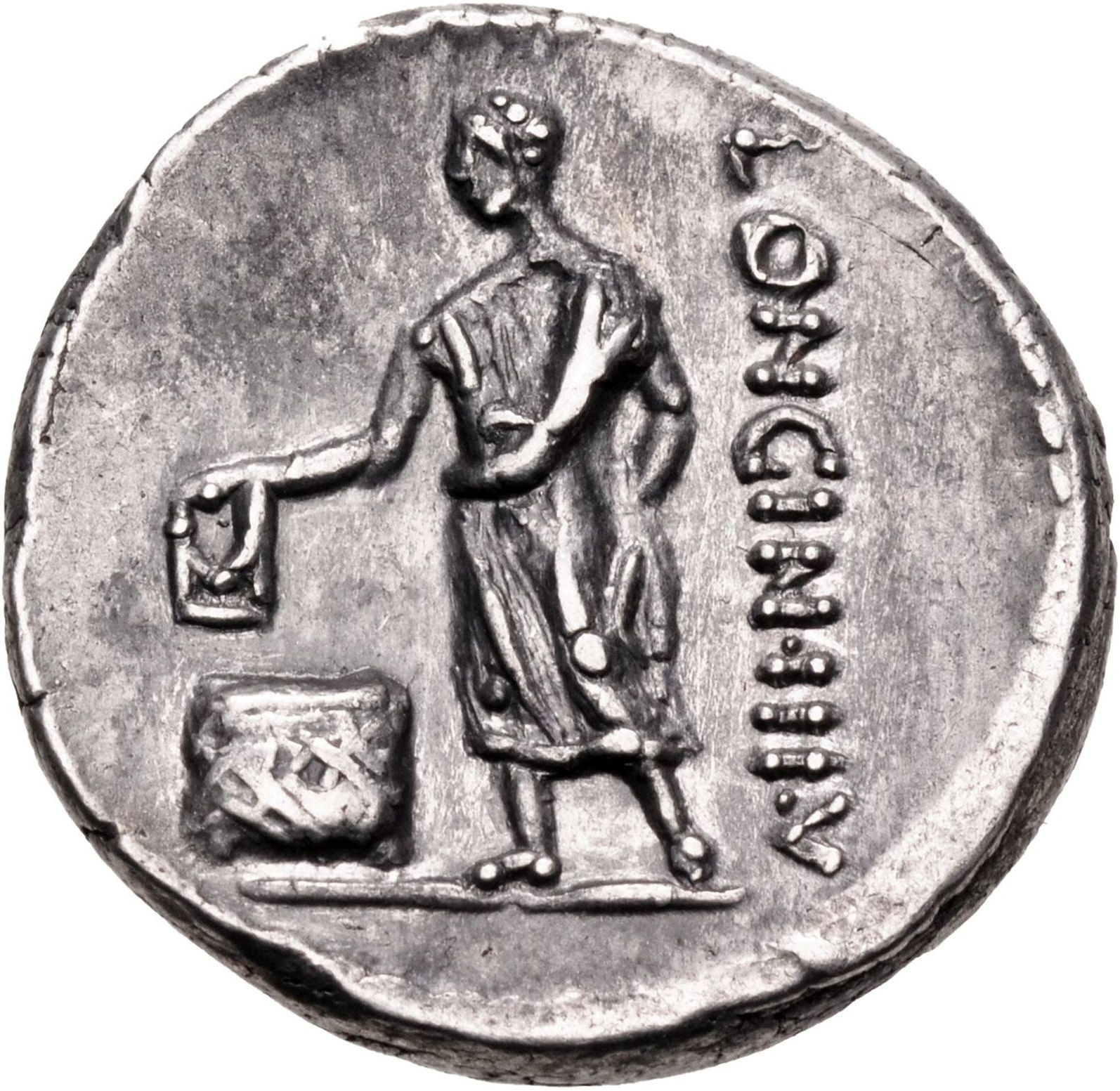
Reverse of a denarius minted by Lucius Cassius Longinus in 63 BC, depicting a Roman citizen casting a ballot into an urn.

In the Roman Republic, elections were held annually for every major magistracy. They were conducted before two assemblies (Latin: comitia): the centuriate and tribal assemblies. The centuriate assembly, made up of centuries divided by wealth and age, elected the senior magistrates: those with imperium (the consuls and the praetors) and the censors. The tribal assembly, made up of tribes grouped by geography, elected all other magistrates. Plebeian tribunes and aediles were also elected by the tribal assembly although in a slightly different form.

The formal electoral process started with an announcement by the prospective presiding magistrate of an election day, typically in July. Candidates then professed their candidacy to that magistrate. On the day of the election, the voting unit – centuries or tribes – would be called to give their votes. Citizens voted in person for their candidate and the unit registered one vote for each open post (eg, for the two consuls, a century would vote for two candidates). Once a candidate received a majority, 97 centuries or 18 tribes, he won and was removed from the contest. Once all posts were filled, elections ended and all centuries or tribes that had not voted were dismissed. If nightfall came before elections were complete, the entire process had to restart, typically on the next legislative day.

There were no political parties in the republic. Candidates campaigned largely on their own personal virtue, personal or family reputation, or gifts distributed to voters. Reflecting the unpredictability of elections, bribes given to voters in the form of money, food, and games were a common and burdensome campaign expense. Regardless, those with a family reputation in politics (the nobiles) – and a family name that could be recognised by the voters – regularly dominated electoral results.

Roman elections, while extremely important for political life because no legislation could be passed without the initiative of a magistrate, were not representative of the citizenry. The malapportionment of the comitia centuriata weighted the 193 centuries, each of which received one vote, strongly towards the old and rich. The comitia tributa gave each of the 35 tribes the same vote even if the number of voters within them was wildly different. Moreover, because all public affairs were conducted in person, poorer people from the countryside unable to take the time off to travel to Rome were unable to exercise their rights. Although all freed slaves became citizens on manumission, they were confined to the four "urban" tribes regardless of actual residence, limiting their voice in politics. Scholars have estimated that in the late republic turnout could not have been more than about 10 per cent.

After the fall of the republic and the establishment of the Roman Empire, elections – thoroughly dominated by the emperor's influence – initially continued. During the reign of Tiberius, the power of nomination was transferred to the senate. From then on, with a short interlude under Caligula, all magistrates were nominated in a list that was then inevitably confirmed by an assembly. After some time, this too was abolished. Elections at the municipal level, however, conducted under bylaws generally modelled on the republican constitution, continued well into the first and second centuries AD.

== Procedure ==
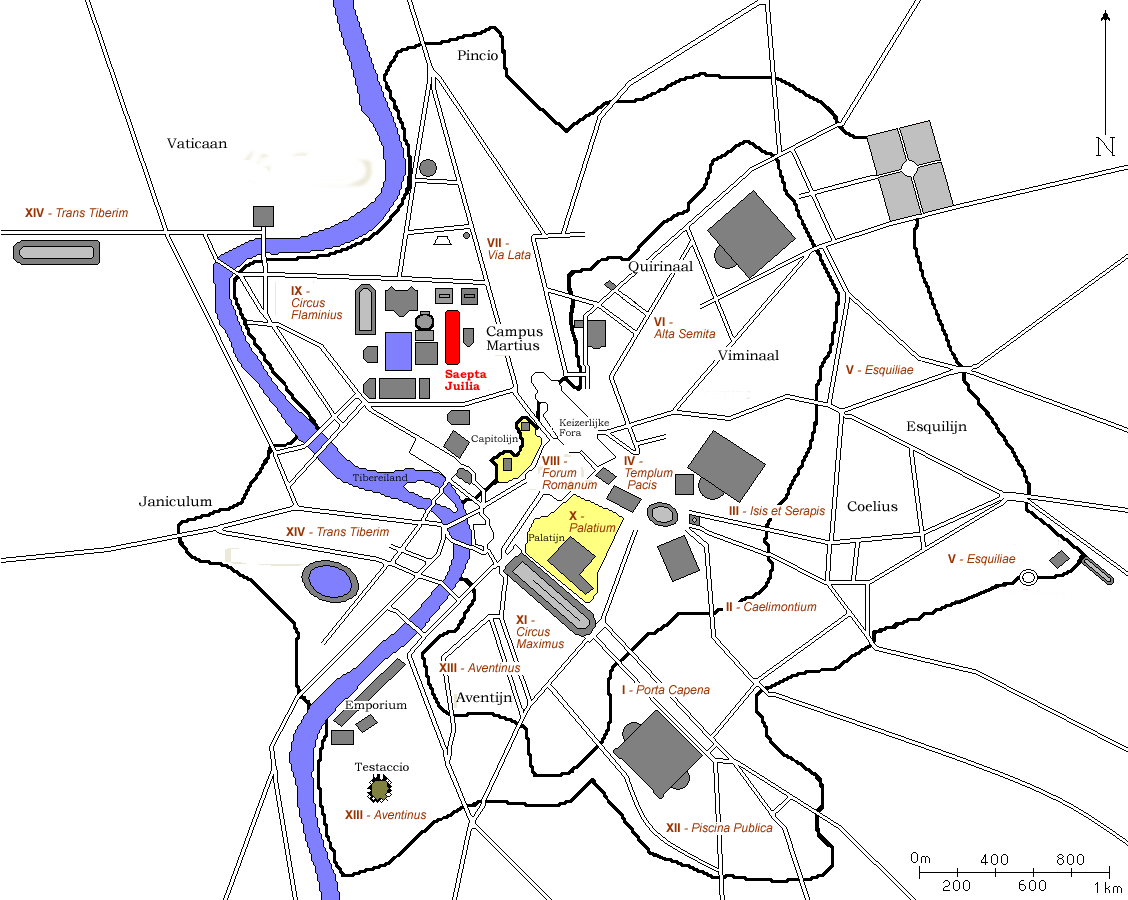
During the late republic, all elections took place in the ovile, which in imperial times was rebuilt in marble as the rectangular saepta Julia (in red).

Elections customarily took place around the same time each year in the centuriate and tribal assemblies under similar procedures. After Sulla's constitutional reforms, this was normally in July (then called Quintilis). A proclamation was issued by the magistrate who would oversee the elections in a public meeting – a contio – which was memorialised in writing and posted publicly.

Roman religion permeated this process and elections could not be held on days which were reserved for religious business (such as the dies nefasti, unlucky days, reserved for purification). After the lex Caecilia Didia in 98 BC, a trinundinum – three market days (market days occurred every eight days) – was observed between the announcement and taking place of elections. Prior to the election itself, auguries also had to be taken to screen for inauspicious omens. Moreover, all elections had to be conducted within a single day prior to nightfall.

After a public prayer calling on the support of the gods for the Roman people and those who were to be elected, the magistrate instructed the citizens to divide (descedite quirites) and to vote (ite ad suffragium). Citizens then reported to their relevant division and presented themselves to officials who would record their vote.

=== Comitia centuriata ===
The comitia centuriata elected the consuls, praetors, and censors. There were 193 voting blocks, called centuries, which always convened outside Rome on the Campus Martius. Citizens were assigned to centuries based on their age and wealth, with the old and wealthy receiving more centuries as a proportion of the population. Reforms intervened in the third century BC to link the number of centuries to the number of tribes. Specifically, the first census class which had eighty centuries was reduced to seventy; this created one junior and senior century – members divided by age – for each of the thirty-five tribes. However, the resulting division of centuries for the second through fifth classes (their number did not change) is not known. Regardless, even after these reforms, the centuries remained malapportioned heavily in favour of older and wealthier citizens.

Prior to those reforms, when the consul ordered the centuries to divide and vote, the eighteen equestrian centuries were first to vote. After the reforms, the first to vote was the centuria praerogativa, selected by lot from the junior centuries of the first class. This century's result was immediately announced and was widely seen as an omen on the election: Cicero notes that this result secured the election of at least one of the consuls. Roman religion regularly interpreted chance emerging from lot as divining the will of the gods. The result from the prerogative century had religious significance; it also served a political purpose by randomising results – minimising divisions within the oligarchy – and nudging the remaining centuries to vote accordingly.

After the prerogative century, the remaining junior centuries of the first class voted, followed by the first class' senior centuries and the eighteen equestrian centuries. After those eighty-eight (88) centuries voted, the second class was called. Because the first class, equestrians, and second class made up a majority of voting units, if they all agreed on who should be elected, all posts would now be filled and voting would then end. Only when upper divisions disagreed did the lower classes, called in rank order, vote. Substantial debate has been had over whether elections continued into the lower classes due to divisions in the upper ones; views range from rare extension into the third class to elections regularly extension into the fourth.

=== Comitia tributa ===
The comitia tributa elected all other magistrates, including the aediles, plebeian tribunes, quaestors, and military tribunes. While there has been made a distinction between a comitia tributa called by the normal magistrates that includes patricians and a concilium plebis called by plebeian tribunes of plebeians only, it is not clear whether this distinction mattered. Regardless, both operated under the same procedure and were differentiated only by the presiding magistrate.

The assembly had, by 241 BC, thirty-five voting blocks called tribes (tribus). Citizens were assigned to tribes based on where they resided. Four of the thirty-five tribes were assigned to the city of Rome itself and called "urban" tribes. These tribes too were malapportioned since there was no guarantee that each tribe would have an at all similar number of voters. The rest of the tribes, termed "rural", could also encompass territory extremely distant from Rome, which, due to the requirement that all votes had to be given at Rome, has led to many scholars viewing those voters as effectively disenfranchised. Whether this was actually the case, however, is debated.

The traditional meeting place of an electoral tribal assembly was the Forum – near the rostra and comitium – or the summit of the Capitoline Hill near the Temple of Jupiter Optimus Maximus. It is not known when exactly these electoral assemblies were moved to the campus Martius, but it was certainly after the tribunate of Tiberius Gracchus in 133 BC. After the move, the voters were there divided into their tribes by wooden fencing and rope.

The first tribe to be called, the principium, was selected by lot among the thirty-one rural tribes. Prior to the move to the campus Martius, the tribes then voted in a sequence set by lot. However, after the move, the tribes then all voted simultaneously. It is not known whether there was a sequence of voters within each tribe. While all tribes voted simultaneously, their results were announced in an order determined by lot: this continued until a candidate received the votes of 18 tribes, a majority. Once the number of candidates corresponding to the number of open offices had been elected, all remaining votes were discarded.

Elections, however, to the post of pontifex maximus were different. He was not elected by the whole Roman people. Under the presidency of a pontifex, seventeen tribes – one less than a majority – selected by lot then voted under the same procedure. Between 104 and the dictatorship of Sulla, and then after 63 BC, this was also extended to all priesthoods.

=== After the election ===
The presiding magistrate had the power to reject electoral results both of the election as a whole and of any one voting block. Magistrates were elected for a specific term. Winners of elections which took place before that term started became magistrates-designate; winners of elections within the term itself assumed office immediately either because elections could not have been held previously or because the previous officeholder was dead. Most magistracies took office at the start of the new year which after 153 BC was set to be 1 January.

However, before they could take office, a trial for electoral bribery could intervene. This was instituted some time by 115 BC, when the first known trial – that of Gaius Marius in praetorian elections – was held. By the late republic, a permanent court (quaestio) was established for such cases and allegations of electoral bribery were extremely common. In some cases, the whole slates of victors could be prosecuted, as in the consular elections of 65 BC. That year, the two consuls-designate were convicted and the results were thrown out, with elections held anew. The corrupt winners were removed from the senate and disqualified from office for ten years. Legislation in the late republic made such penalties more severe, with exile being decreed the punishment after the lex Tullia in 63 BC and further penalties also extended to those who assisted candidates in distributing those bribes.

Moreover, for those magistrates with imperium, a further vote was customary before the comitia curiata. During the republican period, this assembly, which was theoretically made up of thirty curiae into which all Roman citizens were assigned, was a pro forma affair. Instead, the entire people were symbolically represented by thirty lictors who would in all cases ritually vote through a lex curiata de imperio bestowing the power of command on the magistrate as it had been in the days of the kings.

== Candidature ==
According to Polybius, candidates had to have served ten years military service. This military service requirement, however, was largely ignored by the late republic. Candidates also were required to not have been convicted of any crimes, not currently be the subject of pending legal proceedings, and show three generations of free (non-slave) ancestors.

Candidates also had to be eligible, of course, for the office they were standing for. This took the form of a specific and sequential order of posts, the cursus honorum ("course of honours") which was prescribed by law with minimum age requirements. The first version of a law to that effect was the lex annalis by Lucius Villius dated by Livy to 180 BC. This first law required that someone wait, at a minimum, two years between magistracies and set minimum ages for the consulship and praetorship. Requirements were restated by Sulla's lex annalis in 81 BC, setting minimum ages for the quaestorship, praetorship, and consulship at 30, 39, and 42 years, respectively.

Candidature was professed to the prospective presiding magistrate (Latin: professio) some time before the election. Under the lex Caecilia Didia it seems this was immediately after the elections were announced. The professio had to be in person at Rome, though for candidates this was merely the start of the official campaign: candidates regularly started their campaigns well earlier to build support when the time came. If the candidate convinced the presiding magistrate that all requirements were met he was added to the list of candidates. There was a deadline for candidacy and after the list was finalised it could not be changed. There were also no write-in ballots: a vote for a person not on the list of candidates was discarded.

=== Campaigning ===
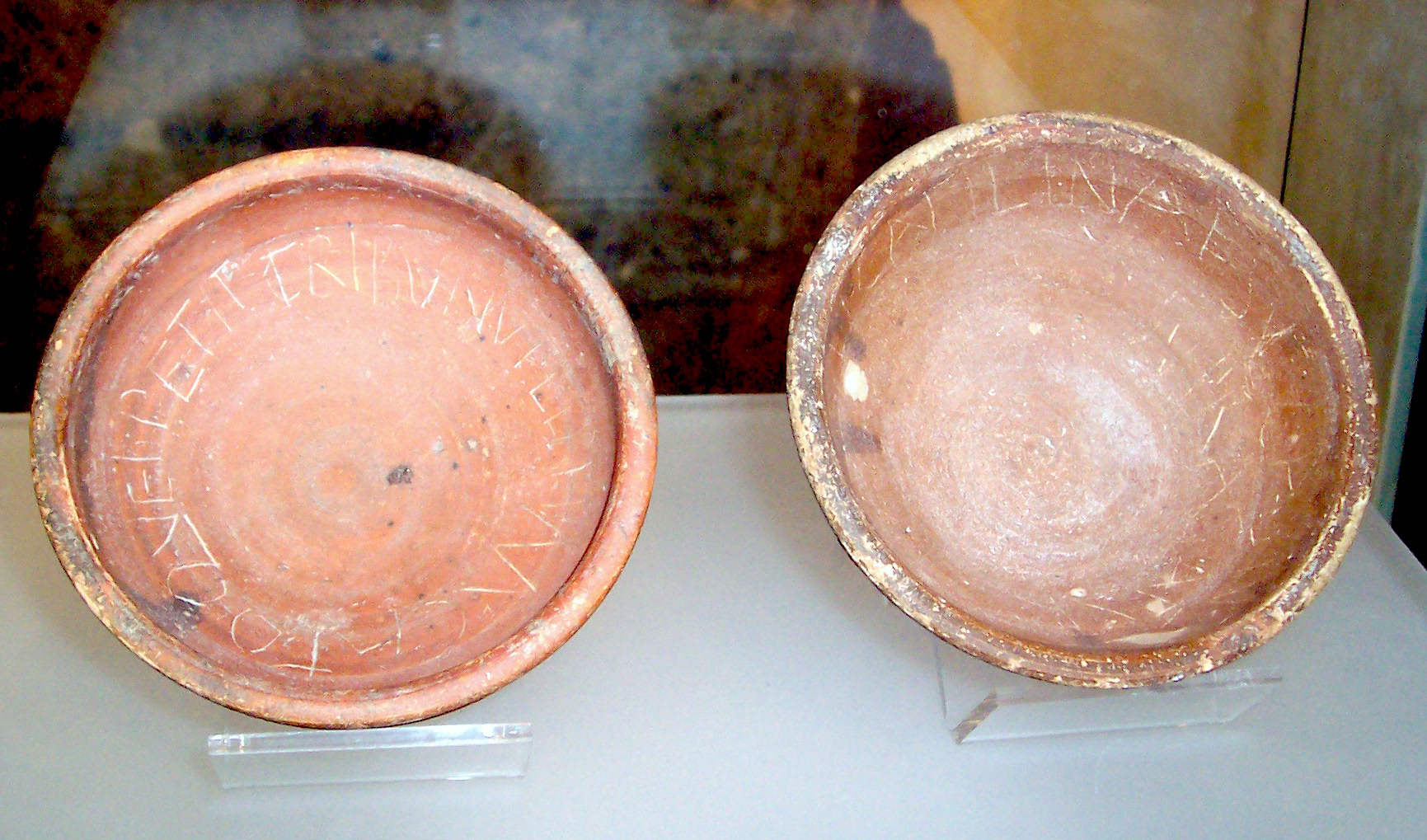
Propaganda cups of Cato (left) and Catiline (right). Cups filled with food were distributed to the people to build support for candidates.

The campaign itself was called the petitio. The main source on Roman campaigning is the Commentariolum Petitionis which is attributed to Quintus Tullius Cicero (younger brother of the orator and consul of 63). The main subject of Roman campaigns were personal factors relating to a candidate's personal merits and public image with comparison to negative traits of rival candidates. Politicians also cultivated the favour of various groups from different parts of society and made attempts to curry undecided voters.

At consular elections, because Roman elections were highly weighted towards the wealthy (ie timocratic), campaigns largely revolved around the elite and the top two or three census classes. However, candidates did seek the favour of less well-off citizens since they could serve to influence patrons in the higher census classes. Indeed, candidates (who were mostly members of the aristocracy) were expected to come to the Forum or other public areas, greeting prospective voters of all classes in person.

However, there were no political parties: "it is common knowledge nowadays that populares did not constitute a coherent political group or 'party' (even less so than their counterparts, optimates)". Ideological campaigns were generally frowned upon – the Commentariolum Petitionis in fact recommends avoiding state affairs entirely – but did occur sporadically: candidates occasionally proposed policies when standing for the plebeian tribunate or expressed opinions on military affairs as candidates for the consulship.

Successful candidates attempted to build name recognition from the start of their careers. One avenue for this was prosecutions in the courts. Politicians also attempted to have themselves elected aedile so to sponsor extravagant public games and spectacles to curry favour with the voting public. During the campaign itself, candidates wore a bright white toga (Latin: toga candida) and met voters in person in the forum while accompanied by large groups of supporters to build prestige. Without the right to call rallies or public meetings, which was the exclusive prerogative of the sitting magistrates, candidates would instead host political banquets providing food to the public or give away tickets to games or shows.

Endorsements were also of value. These came from family, personal friends, political allies (called "friends"; Latin: amici), and clients. Allies were those who shared outlooks and expected to collaborate on shared matters in the senate and other parts of public life; however, these alliances were many times short and fluid. Clients could sometimes be won, as in the case of Cicero, by defence in the courts. The role of family and ancestry was also very important: those with consular ancestors made reference thereto. While men like Sallust, Cicero, and Marius expressed some bitterness about the old aristocracy's advantages, the Roman voters and the electoral results – which returned the scions of a small number of powerful and prestigious families to the most senior posts – evidently reflected their importance.

=== Corruption ===
Fundraising was necessary since Roman campaigns were extremely expensive: candidates drew from their own fortunes, received support from friends or political allies, and also borrowed huge sums to finance their campaigns. There were no controls over political donations or fundraising in republican times. There were, however, limitations on what campaign funds could be used for: especially campaign events thought to be too luxurious. Laws were also passed to prohibit electoral bribery (Latin: ambitus) but this was not a prohibition of gifts or bribes per se; only gifts which cut across existing client-patron relationships were regulated.

Some scholars paint a picture of an effective market for votes where the fact that a single elector could vote in multiple elections in succession, "two consular candidates, eight praetorian candidates, and two curule aediles, not to mention quaestors and [plebeian magistrates]". This is a picture of cash bribes from candidates to voters – in 54 BC the centuria praerogativa was supposedly promised ten million sesterces if it would vote for two certain candidates – accumulating in the pocket of a voter after some twelve successive bribes along with free banquets, shows, event tickets, and food handouts paid from multiple candidates all paid for at each candidate's personal expense.

Many series of restrictions on candidates' expenses came into effect through the late republic. This included restrictions on the size of banquets, the number of campaign staff, and the value of gifts. However, it was possible in the late republic to evade many of these restrictions by having a supposed third-party distribute the gifts on a candidate's behalf. Moreover, consistent with patronage relations at Rome, it was relatively accepted for candidates to distribute gifts – such as tickets to gladiatorial shows and banquets – to members of their own electoral tribe and within pre-existing patronage relationships.

== History and development ==
The development of Roman elections is not very clear, as is much of early Roman history. Sources on this early period, which were written by and for the nobiles (a class of elites defined by their repeated election to the highest magistracies), are anachronistic and unclear. Nor is it clear that the early republic had elections: the early republic in the fifth century might not have had any central state organisation to which magisterial elections could have meaningfully applied; nor is it concretely known whether Rome was governed in this early period by consuls or whether the divide between plebeians and patricians so emphasised in the annalistic accounts was as absolute as commonly claimed.

=== Early elections and acclamation ===
The Latin vocabulary for elections and voting implies early voting was largely acclamatory, where the purpose of elections was to affirm popular consent for elite leadership choices. The earliest Roman assemblies were those of the comitia curiata which acclaimed the kings, predating the republic, by swearing an oath to obey the monarch and possibly banging weapons to signal their assent. The formal procedure of Roman elections reflects this archaic procedure and it is likely that during the early republic the magistrates merely designated successors and called assemblies so that the people could voice their approval.

This historical context meant that the power of the presiding magistrate over an electoral assembly was vast. Even after competitive elections with multiple candidates were introduced, magistrates had the ability to throw out voting results (though this was exercised rarely due to protest; a magistrate acting without support usually gave way). Moreover, the early republic saw the ability of the senate to interfere in elections: decisions of the assemblies required approval of the senate and it was not until the third century lex Maenia which required the senate to approve elections prior to their taking place rather than after their results were in.

While the Romans recognised three different popular assemblies, the comitia curiata, centuriata, and tributa, only the last two had much relevance under the classical constitution. All of the various comitia were believed to date back into the regal period. Competitive elections, marked by the creation of the combined patrician and plebeian elite which defined its self-worth in terms of repeated election to the magistracies (the nobiles), developed some time between 367–287 BC with the close of the struggle of the orders.

=== Reform in the middle and late republics ===
The number of magistrates to be elected annually increased over time as the number of praetors, quaestors, and other minor magistrates rose. By the late republic, there were some forty-four senior magistrates elected every year. There were also major reforms in the way the elections were run.

The comitia centuriata was reformed some time between 241 and 216 BC, though probably also before 221 BC. The original Servian distribution of the centuries, where beyond the eighteen equestrian and five supernumerary centuries, the first class had eighty centuries while the remaining classes had twenty (except the fifth class with thirty) was abolished. Replacing it was a system which aligned the centuries to tribes, assigning two centuries for each tribe to the first class; the total number of centuries however remained the same. The other classes also likely received tribally designed centuries but specific mechanism for how the 280 centuries of the second through fifth classes were transformed into 100 voting centuries is not known. One suggestion, brought by Theodor Mommsen and suggested by the tabula Hebana, is that each lower class received seventy centuries which were then combined by lot or custom into those 100 total voting centuries.

The rationale for the reform has been variously explained. Some have suggested that it was intended to more equitably distribute the centuries among the people; Others have denied its impacts. The most insipid explanation, however, would be an increase in the ruling class' voting power by taking its control of the tribes – where rural magnates enjoyed a substantial advantage – and mapping it directly onto the centuries as well.

The passage of the lex Villia annalis in 180 fixed minimum ages at which men became eligible to certain offices. By imposing a higher age requirement on the consulship, it also formally placed it at the top of the Roman magisterial order and likely reflected the full development of the cursus honorum ("course of honours").

The lex Gabinia passed in 139 BC required that votes in elections, which had previously been oral, be inscribed in small wax tablets. This replaced oral tallying done by election officials, who then on counted the tablets and tallied the votes afterwards. Concerns about pressure on voters seems to have remained regular through the 2nd century BC with legislation brought by Gaius Gracchus and Gaius Marius, 123–22 BC and 119 BC respectively, mandating secret ballot in courts and the physical separation of voters and crowds. Secret ballot was phased in to all assembly business by incremental legislation after 139 BC: the lex Cassia of 137 brought it to non-capital trials; the lex Papiria of 131 brought it to legislative comitia; and the lex Coelia of 106 brought it to capital trials. In 104 BC, secret ballot was also introduced for election to priesthoods. The successive introduction of secret ballot had the effect of making it more difficult to gain votes by bribery while also giving assemblies more political independence, further splintering political consensus within the republic. Secret ballot's introduction, qua anticorruption measure, has also been connected to legislation that came into effect in this period establishing permanent courts to try allegations of electoral bribery.

The period also saw, however, an expansion in the extent of political violence. The first instance was the death of the plebeian tribune Tiberius Gracchus in 133 BC while he was standing for re-election, followed by the killing of his brother Gaius and Marcus Flaccus in 122 BC at the decree of the Senate. Urban violence continued, with two candidates at the elections of 100 BC, Lucius Appuleius Saturninus and Gaius Servilius Glaucia, murdering one of their electoral competitors. Order was again restored by a decree of the Senate but the two were killed by a mob after their capture. The reforms initiated from the 130s onward, along with the normalisation of violence in the political sphere, have been read as implying a widespread recognition of the need for reform and dissatisfaction with republican political institutions.

=== Enfranchisement of Italy ===
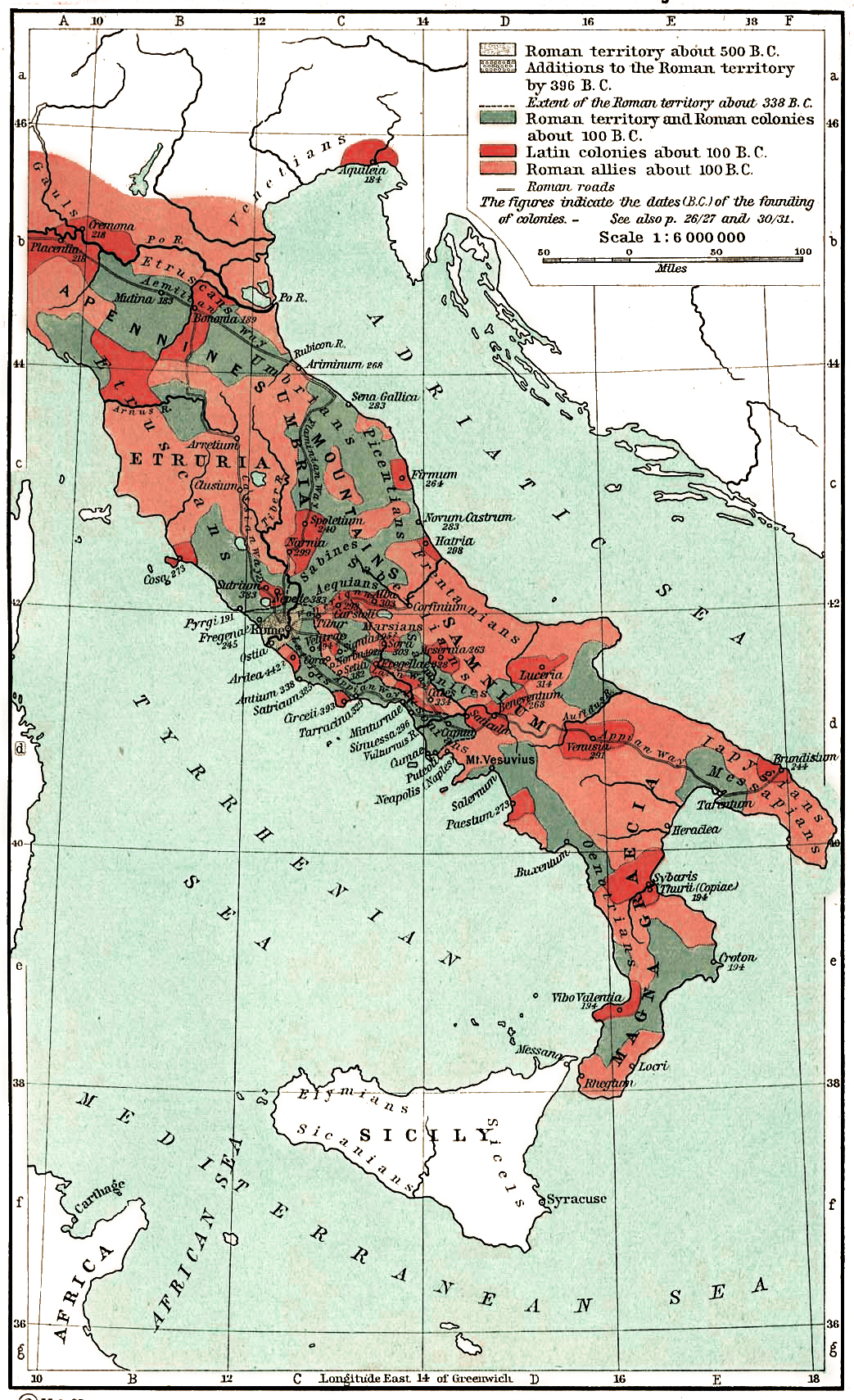
Prior to the Social War, the areas in red were allies to Rome. By its conclusion, those areas were annexed to the republic and the free men living there enfranchised. The almost-doubling of the citizenry had major impacts on elections in the late republic.

The Social War, fought between the Romans and their Italian allies, saw the Italian allies mostly put down their arms when the republic, through the lex Julia de civitate and lex Plautia Papiria, extended Roman citizenship to those allies. The two laws immediately started a row over how the new citizens were to be distributed within the centuries and tribes. The initial plan was to confine the new citizens into a limited number of new tribes. Under those laws, the entire mass of new citizens were to be confined to a limited number of tribes (ten new ones per Appian, eight existing ones per Velleius). These attempts to contain the Italians' political influence continued through the immediately following census of 89 BC, where the presiding censors may have deliberately botched the religious aspects of the census so to delay the new citizens' enrolment. The question of new tribes was settled after 86 BC when the senate – intimidated by Lucius Cornelius Cinna's troops after a short civil conflict – decreed that no new tribes were to be created and that the new citizens be enrolled into the existing thirty-one rural tribes; however, actual enrolment into the tribes and centuries would take at least until the census of 70 BC. Even when Lucius Cornelius Sulla returned from the east to start a civil war, he was forced to give assurances that he would not disturb the new citizens' assignment.

The expansion of citizenship to Italy contributed greatly to the approximate doubling of the citizenry between 86 and 70 BC, from 463,000 to 910,000 male citizens. The new citizens, even before their full registration, were mobilised for political interests: Cinna, by linking his victory in civil conflict with support for Italian enrolment in the existing tribes, was able to mobilise an army sufficient to defeat and overawe his consular colleague and much of the senate. Late republican documents such as the Commentariolum Petitionis indicate the importance the new citizens and a candidate's need to maintain good relations with the Italian magnates in the upper centuries. Sulla, in victory, also recruited many new senators from the Italian municipalities; however, many other victims of his proscriptions and their descendants were also disqualified from office. Ambitious men from Italian towns had opportunities opened to them at Rome, to become candidates and victors in contests for magistracies. These new men increased the competitiveness of elections and, amid an expanded electorate, found themselves within a more opaque electorate; they responded to these competitive pressures with greater bribery and violence, which complicated and raised the stakes of politics. The greater numbers of citizens also further reduced the representativeness of assemblies, who now represented men who would likely never exercise their suffrage rights.

=== End of elections ===
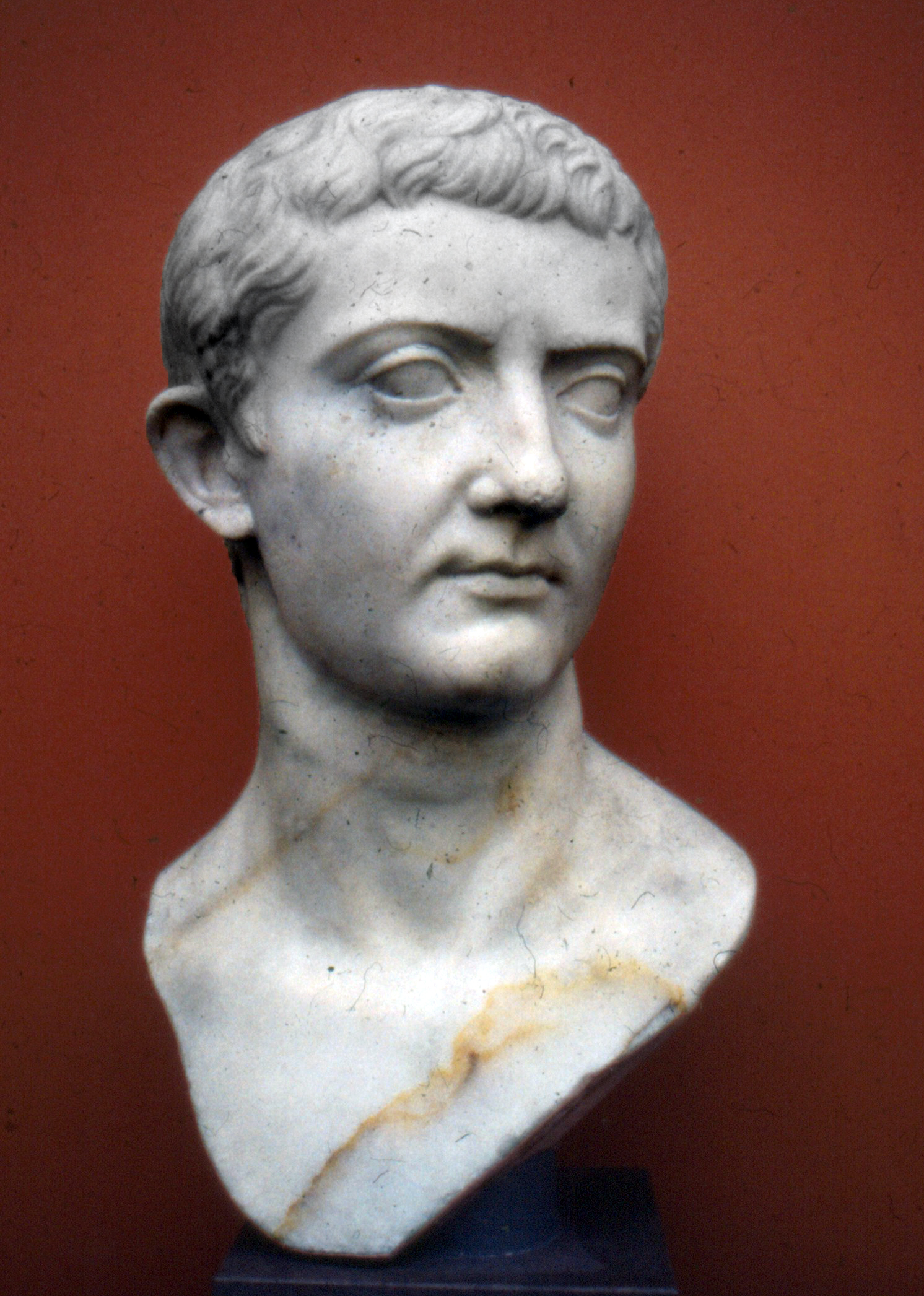
The emperor Tiberius (r. AD 14–37) de facto transferred elections to the senate.

Caesar's civil war, which started in January 49 BC, triggered a disruption in competitive elections. For much of Caesar's war in the provinces against his enemies, elections were held late or irregularly. They also were heavily stage-managed, with Caesar presenting and commending only a few candidates who invariably were declared victorious. The circumcision of the Roman people's choice, backlash among the aristocracy which defined their self-worth in winning such electoral contests, and the decline in expenditures by candidates – cutting off voters from candidates' largesse – were factors which led to Caesar's growing unpopularity before his eventual assassination in 44 BC. In the aftermath of Caesar's death, his selections for offices years into the future were regardless retained. And in the war that followed the next year, elections were decided not by votes but by the intimidation of soldiers. In the triumviral period that followed, the results of elections were set by political expediency rather than by any kind of popular choice.

The putative "restoration of the republic" which Augustus began in 28 BC saw him elected consul through to 23 BC while exercising substantial control over elections; his abandonment of the consulship in 23 saw a return to robust electioneering and competition at Rome. The attempt in 19 BC, by an urban plebeian uprising, to secure the consulship for Marcus Egnatius Rufus, was suppressed by the lone consul and the senate with force. Following those elections and Egnatius' death, news of public electoral competition for the consulship largely disappears. Through the most of Augustus' reign, however, he continued to exert influence through broadly traditional republican means by campaigning for his men before the people.

A law in AD 5, the lex Valeria Cornelia, gave certain centuries of senators and equites – originally ten, later expanded by AD 23 to 20, – who would meet before the formal elections to select preferred candidates termed destinati. Their preferred candidates were announced and immediately afterwards the rest of the comitia voted. The most convincing explanation for its purpose was to ensure orderly elections by showing the auctoritas (social influence) of the senate and equites while minimising public electoral canvassing, bribery, and riots. Regardless, at various times during Augustus' reign, riots or other disorders showed the emperor's domination of the state more clearly: in 19 BC he created a consul and amid failed elections in AD 7 appointed all the magistrates directly. These actions may have been scrupulously ratified by law but showed the limited freedom of choice available to electors.

Shortly after Tiberius' accession to the throne, candidates for the praetorship would be selected by the emperor and by the senate: the emperor would select four with the senate selecting the others. The candidates were then submitted en bloc to the comitia centuriata for ratification. By transferring these nominations to the senate, aristocratic competition became unmoored from popular support. Accordingly, prospective candidates cut back on expenditures for the expensive games and other festivals that had previously been necessary to win such support. For a short period under Caligula, the elections for praetor were transferred back to the people, to their benefit, as candidates again paid them attention and the people benefited from their electoral largesse. The added expenses proved unpopular with the senatorial elite, who forced a return to Tiberius' en bloc approach after Caligula's death.

By the later Roman empire, the comitia in Rome was irrelevant. The saepta Julia in Rome had by this point long lost any electoral capacity – it was opened in 26 BC by Marcus Vipsanius Agrippa and was shortly thereafter converted into a shopping centre – and the ability to appoint magistrates had long been transferred to the emperor. The formerly republican state of affairs was not forgotten, however. For example, one of the consuls of AD 379, Ausonius, in a speech thanked the emperor Gratian, remarking:

I have not had to endure the Saepta or the Campus, or the voting, or [their counting], or the ballot boxes. I have not had to press peoples' hands... I have no gone round the tribus, or flattered the centuriae, or had to tremble when the classes were called... I have not made any deposit with a trustee or agreed anything with a diribitor. The [Roman people], the Martius campus, the [equestrian order], the rostra, the [saepta], the senate, the curia, for me Gratian alone was all these things.

At the municipal level, rather than that of the Roman state, elections continued. Many communities had local bylaws modelled on the republican system with local senates, magistrates (the highest usually titled duoviri), and voting blocks. Archaeological evidence from Pompeii also indicates that into the Flavian period elections at this level were still vigorously contested before the local citizens. This state of affairs continued at least into the late second century AD.

== Popular participation ==
Elections were extremely important in terms of converting political initiative to policy. While the assemblies had plenary legislative authority, they had no right of initiative, meaning they were dominated entirely by the executive magistrates. Because of this structure, the election of magistrates was the only means through which popular demands could be translated into state action.

By the middle of the 20th century and especially after Ronald Syme's Roman Revolution (1939), scholars had largely settled on an oligarchic framework for understanding republican politics. The oligarchic conception of republican politics is predicated on the dominance of the aristocracy over the voting population; in the early 20th century the mechanism for this dominance was generally thought to be interlocking system of client–patron relationships emanating from factions of powerful noble families in the political centre. By the mid-20th century later scholars had refined the oligarchic view and discarded its reliance on permanent family-based factions and patronage to control voters. Regardless, in this view, the natural conservatism of Roman voters – conditioned to vote for the scions of famous families – along with personal cultivation of popular support, were then mainly arrayed to contest aristocratic interests such as military commands and legitimate aristocratic control of the state. There some reasons to believe republican politics was essentially oligarchic. While all Roman citizens were afforded the theoretical right to vote, the Roman tribes and centuries wildly malapportioned those votes. Compounding this difficulty, the Romans made no attempts to increase turnout, requiring that all public business occur within or nearby Rome, an expensive and special difficulty for citizens who lived in Italy or even further afield, such as in Cisalpine Gaul (modern northern Italy). Both factors trend towards most eligible voters, who lived far from Rome, declining to participate due to the costs involved in going to Rome to express a vote that had little value anyway. These incentives therefore implied a small and pliant electorate ready to uphold the aristocracy by bestowing legitimacy in consensus rituals.

The "Roman democracy" thesis was proposed in the 1980s by Fergus Millar and others, emphasising the importance of the voters in Roman assemblies and challenging the then-widespread oligarchic view as a "frozen waste". Millar instead argued that the republic's popular institutions were significant and allowed for citizens' initiatives to be transformed, if in a variable and imperfect way, to real political change at Rome. Against senatorial domination of the state, Millar stressed the independence of plebeian tribunes and their use of the assemblies to enact legislation against the will of the broader aristocracy. Republican politicians' rhetorical themes of popular liberty (Latin: libertas populi) and ability to commit politically damaging gaffes suggests that winning and keeping large parts of society on side was a necessary skill in the highly competitive, or at least unpredictable, electoral environment. The enormous sums spent by campaigns on banquets and games for common people also suggests their influence in electoral outcomes. The large number of candidates in the late republic also had the effect of splitting votes, meaning that elections at least for the praetorship more readily involved the poorer voting classes. Such democratic interpretations also accord well with claims of high turnout, driven likely by organised local or political interest groups travelling to Rome en masse or individuals simply participating in civic ritual to "feel Roman".

There is, however, no hard evidence of turnout at Roman elections or legislative assemblies; what evidence is available is unrevealing because it is largely impressionistic. The limitations of the evidence are sufficient that it is not possible to prove or disprove that Roman elections saw high or low turnout. Evidence of low turnout is generally taken from the size of the voting spaces, which would imply total turnout of less than 60,000 if all voters had to fit within; whether this was a meaningful limit – for example, if voters could wait elsewhere until called to give their votes – is not known. If binding, such spaces imply turnout in the post-Social war era at most of 8% with turnout more likely in the range 0.66–1.85%. Even if not binding, it is difficult to countenance more than 10% of citizens participating. Under such circumstances, there has emerged a more compromise position which stresses both the importance of the popular element in electoral and political competition while also recognising considerable practical and cultural limits on popular pressure, especially when the ruling class was united. Such views place the electorate more as arbiters between factional alternatives within the ruling class (itself rarely united) rather than as a truly independent source of political initiative.

== Bibliography ==
=== Modern sources ===
- Arena, Valentina; Prag, Jonathan, eds. (2022). A companion to Roman political culture. Hoboken, NJ: Wiley Blackwell. ISBN 978-1-119-67365-1. LCCN 2021024437.
  - Cornell, Tim C. "Roman political assemblies". In Arena & Prag (2022), pp. 220–35.
  - Yakobson, Alexander. "The political culture of the republic since Syme's The Roman revolution: a story of a debate". In Arena & Prag (2022), pp. 93–106.
- Beck, Hans; et al., eds. (2011). Consuls and res publica. Cambridge University Press. ISBN 978-1-107-00154-1. LCCN 2011017494.
  - Herulet, Frédéric. "Consulship and consuls under Augusts". In Beck et al. (2011), pp. 319–35.
  - Smith, Christopher. "The magistrates of the early Roman republic". In Beck et al. (2011), pp. 19–40.
- Bowman, Alan K; et al., eds. (1996). The Augustan empire, 43 BC–AD 69. Cambridge Ancient History. Vol. 10 (2nd ed.). ISBN 0-521-26430-8.
  - Pelling, C. "The triumviral period". In CAH^{2} 10 (1996), pp. 1–69.
  - Wiedemann, T E J. "Tiberius to Nero". In CAH^{2} 10 (1996), pp. 198–255.
- Broughton, Thomas Robert Shannon (1951). The magistrates of the Roman republic. Vol. 1. New York: American Philological Association.
- Broughton, Thomas Robert Shannon (1952). The magistrates of the Roman republic. Vol. 2. New York: American Philological Association.
- Dart, Christopher J. (2016) [First published by Ashgate, 2014]. The Social war, 91 to 88 BCE: a history of the Italian insurgency against the Roman republic. Routledge. ISBN 978-1-4724-1676-6.
- Flower, Harriet (2010). Roman republics. Princeton University Press. ISBN 978-0-691-14043-8. LCCN 2009004551.
- Grieve, Lucy J (1985). "The reform of the "comitia centuriata"". Historia: Zeitschrift für Alte Geschichte. 34 (3): 278–309. ISSN 0018-2311. JSTOR 4435929.
- Gruen, Erich (1995). The last generation of the Roman republic (Paperback ed.). Berkeley: University of California Press. ISBN 0-520-02238-6.
- Holladay, A J (1978). "The election of magistrates in the early Principate". Latomus. 37 (4): 874–893. ISSN 0023-8856. JSTOR 41531092.
- Levick, B M (1967). "Imperial control of the elections under the early principate: commendatio, suffragatio, and "nominatio"". Historia: Zeitschrift für Alte Geschichte. 16 (2): 207–230. ISSN 0018-2311. JSTOR 4434982.
- Lintott, Andrew (1990). "Electoral bribery in the Roman republic". Journal of Roman Studies. 80: 1–16. doi:10.2307/300277. ISSN 1753-528X.
- Lintott, Andrew (1999). Constitution of the Roman republic. Oxford University Press. ISBN 978-0-19-926108-6. Reprinted 2009.
- Millar, Fergus (1998). The crowd in Rome in the late republic. Jerome Lectures. Ann Arbor: University of Michigan Press. ISBN 978-0-472-10892-3.
- Morstein-Marx, Robert (2021). Julius Caesar and the Roman People. Cambridge University Press. doi:10.1017/9781108943260. ISBN 978-1-108-83784-2. LCCN 2021024626. S2CID 242729962.
- Morstein-Marx, Robert (June 2024). "Paradox of voting: extra-urban voters in the late Roman republic". Klio. 106 (1): 100–159. doi:10.1515/klio-2023-0021. ISSN 2192-7669.
- Mouritsen, Henrik (1998). Italian unification. BICS Supplement 70. London: Institute of Classical Studies. ISBN 0-9005-8781-4.
- Mouritsen, Henrik (2001). Plebs and politics in the late Roman republic. Cambridge University Press. doi:10.1017/cbo9780511482885. ISBN 978-0-521-79100-7.
- Mouritsen, Henrik (2017). Politics in the Roman republic. Cambridge: Cambridge University Press. ISBN 978-1-107-03188-3. OCLC 961266598.
- Paterson, Jeremy (2012). "elections and voting, Roman". Oxford Classical Dictionary (4th ed.). Oxford University Press. doi:10.1093/acrefore/9780199381135.013.7196.
- Rafferty, David (2021). "Rural voters in Roman elections". TAPA. 151 (1): 127–153. doi:10.1353/apa.2021.0004. ISSN 2575-7199.
- Santangelo, Federico (2018). "The Social war". In Farney, Gary D.; Bradley, Guy (eds.). The peoples of ancient Italy. De Gruyter. pp. 231–254. doi:10.1515/9781614513001-013. ISBN 978-1-61451-300-1.
- Tan, James (26 July 2023). "Geography and the reform of the comitia centuriata". Classical Quarterly: 1–18. doi:10.1017/S0009838823000484. ISSN 0009-8388.
- Tatum, W Jeffrey (2003). Classical Journal. 99 (2): 203–216. ISSN 0009-8353. JSTOR 3298069.
- Tatum, W Jeffrey (2009). "Roman democracy?". In Balot, Ryan K (ed.). A companion to Greek and Roman political thought. Wiley. pp. 214–27. doi:10.1002/9781444310344. ISBN 978-1-4051-5143-6.
- Taylor, L R; Linderski, Jerzy (2013) [First ed. published 1960]. The voting districts of the Roman republic: the thirty-five urban and rural tribes (Updated ed.). Ann Arbor: University of Michigan Press. ISBN 978-0-472-11869-4. OCLC 793581620.
- Vishnia, Rachel Feig (2012). Roman elections in the age of Cicero: society, government, and voting. Routledge Studies in Ancient History. New York: Routledge. ISBN 978-0-415-87969-9.
- Yakobson, Alexander (2012). "elections, Roman". In Bagnall, Roger S; et al. (eds.). Encyclopedia of ancient history. Malden, MA: Wiley-Blackwell. doi:10.1002/9781444338386.wbeah20053. ISBN 978-1405179355.

=== Ancient sources ===
- Appian (1913) [2nd century AD]. Civil wars. Loeb Classical Library. Translated by White, Horace. Cambridge: Harvard University Press – via LacusCurtius.
- Cassius Dio (1914–27) [c. AD 230]. Roman history. Loeb Classical Library. Translated by Cary, Earnest – via LacusCurtius. (Nine volumes.)
- Velleius Paterculus (1924). Roman history. Loeb Classical Library. Translated by Shipley, Frederick W. Cambridge: Harvard University Press – via LacusCurtius.
