= Roman assemblies =

Assemblies of the Roman people

The Roman assemblies were meetings of the Roman people duly convened by a magistrate. There were two general kinds of assemblies: a contio where a crowd was convened to hear speeches or statements from speakers without any further arrangements and a comitia where citizens were called and arranged into voting blocks.

When called to enact legislation or make decisions, such as on guilt or war, citizens were in the historical period always divided into voting blocks. Citizens voted directly in these blocks, with a majority of the blocks determining the decision of the assembly; this system was directly democratic with no representatives. There were three kinds of voting blocks – curiae, centuriae, and tribus – giving rise, respectively, to the curiate, centuriate, and tribal assemblies. In the middle and late republics, only the centuriate and tribal assemblies were politically relevant.

The assemblies elected all magistrates during the Roman Republic. They also had plenary authority to make laws, but only exercised this legislative authority at the initiative of a magistrate and in accordance with procedures buttressed by Roman religious practices. Prior to a voting assembly, notice had to be given. On the day thereof, the presiding magistrate took auspices with the gods. When the people were summoned a prayer was conducted and the matter at hand introduced. Speakers invited by the presiding magistrate then could be given; citizens in the assembly had no presumptive right to participate except by listening to the proceedings. When the president called the people to vote, they did so by blocks with a result announced when a majority was reached.

The curiate and centuriate assemblies date to the regal period. Their functions in this early period are poorly documented but mainly relate to the election on the Roman monarch. After the overthrow of the Roman monarchy (dated traditionally to 509 BC) the centuriate assembly is said to have elected the magistrates that would become the consuls, with the tribal assembly being formed shortly after the creation of the republic. The plebeian council, on the other hand, was formed and became coequal with the other assemblies over the course of the Conflict of the Orders. The fall of the republic did not mean that the assemblies stopped to meet. However, their importance quickly diminished as the emperor accrued direct legislative power and the senate became the de facto electoral assembly. The assemblies had become entirely obsolete by the third century AD.

== Comitia ==
A comitia was an assembly summoned to make a decision, about whom should be elected, whether a law should be passed, war and peace, or guilt. Most commonly during the republic, comitia were used for electoral purposes and the word comitia in Latin was used a metonymy for them. This contrasted with contiones (sing. contio) where nothing was enacted.

The word concilium (glossed in English as "council") also referred to some kinds of assemblies. This included foreign ones and assemblies of the plebeians at Rome; however, the word could be used to refer to meetings of the whole Roman people. Usage of concilium was rare in Latin – reference to an assembly of the tribes under the presidency of plebeian tribunes only as a concilium plebis is a modern convention – and there are instances where such an assembly was referred to as comitia tributa. Similarly, there are instances where concilium was used to refer to non-voting assemblies such as contiones.

=== Curiate assembly ===
The curiate assembly (Latin: comitia curiata) was the oldest of the popular assemblies of Rome. It was organised on the basis of curiae and is said to have been the main legislative and electoral assembly of the regal and early republican periods. Little is known of its origins and early operation.

By the late republic, the curiae only met for limited pro forma purposes related to public religion; the historical thirty curiae were each represented by a single lictor rather than actual groups of citizens. The foremost of these purposes was the lex curiata de imperio, passed as a matter of course in the presence of three augurs, which related to the quality of a curule magistrate's auspices. When it met under the presidency of the pontifex maximus, the assembly was instead called the comitia calata to deal with matters relating to wills and selection of priests.

=== Centuriate assembly ===
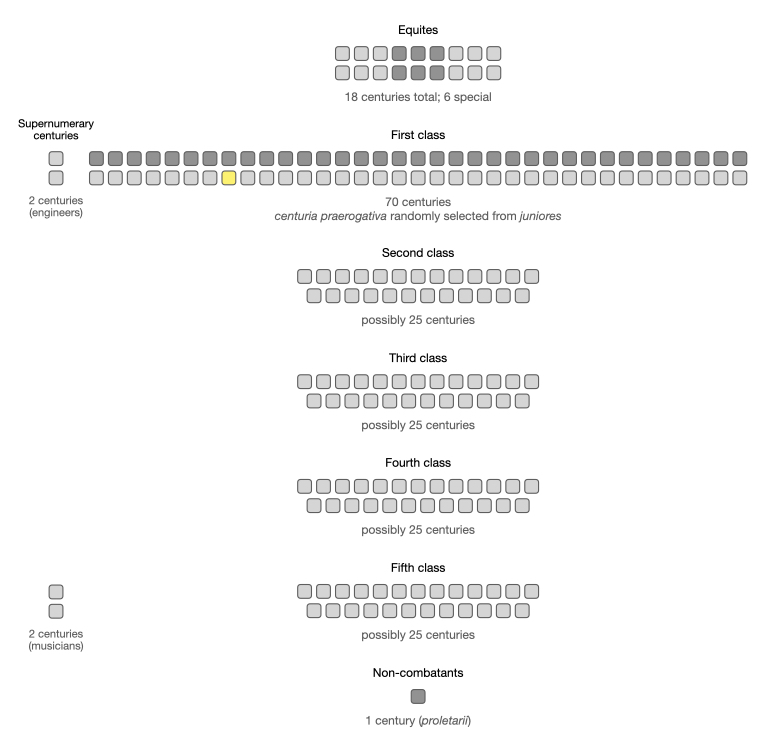
After reforms in the third century BC, the first class of centuries fell from 80 centuries to 70 centuries and the centuria praerogativa was added to guide elections.

The centuriate assembly (Latin: comitia centuriata) was a popular assembly of ancient Rome. In the Roman Republic, its main function was electing the consuls, praetors, and censors. It was made up of 193 centuries (Latin: centuriae) which were apportioned to Roman citizens by wealth and age, hugely overweighting the old and wealthy.

The assembly, according to the ancient sources, dates to the regal period and initially closely resembled the Roman army of the period in form, with the equestrians serving as cavalry, the upper census classes serving as heavy infantry, and the lower classes serving as light infantry. Whether this was ever the case is unclear; regardless, by the third century BC the assembly did not closely resemble the Roman people under arms and it served a largely electoral purpose, as it was rarely called to vote on legislation or to decide – as was its theoretical legal right as place of final appeal – capital cases.

Assembly procedure was weighted towards the upper classes. Both before and after reforms some time between 241 and 216 BC, the first class and equestrians voted first. Their votes would be tallied and announced. Then the classes would vote in descending order of wealth. Once the requisite number of candidates received a majority of voting units, voting would end. Because the equestrians, first class, and second class made a clear majority of voting units, the lower census classes would never be called on if they were in agreement. There is scholarly disagreement as to the extent to which the comitia centuriata facilitated competitive elections, even within its de facto restrictive electorate. The traditional view is that Roman elections were largely unrepresentative of the population as a whole and dominated by the wealthy through social connections.

While the assembly continued to exist during the Roman Empire, it served largely to approve decisions made by the emperor and senate. It is last recorded in the third century AD.

=== Tribal assembly ===
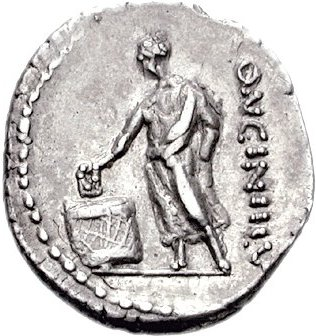
A Roman denarius of 63 BC depicting a voter casting a ballot

The tribal assembly (Latin: comitia tributa) was one of the popular assemblies of ancient Rome, responsible, along with the plebeian council, for the passage of most Roman laws in the middle and late republics. They were also responsible for the elections of a number of junior magistracies: aediles and quaestors especially.

It organised citizens, by the middle republic, into thirty-five artificial tribes which were assigned by geography. The composition of the tribes packed the urban poor into four tribes out of the thirty-five. The requirement that citizens vote in person also discriminated against the rural poor who were not able to travel to Rome.

Each tribe possessed an internal structure and a single vote in the assembly, regardless of the number of citizens belonging to that tribe, which was determined by a majority of the citizens of that tribe present at a vote. Legislative proposals in the assembly as a whole passed when a majority of tribes voted in favour; elections similarly continued until a majority of tribes approved of sufficient candidates that all posts were filled.

The tribal assembly and the plebeian council were organised identically. What differed between them was the presiding magistrate, with the tribal assembly convened by consuls, praetors, or aediles and the plebeian council convened by plebeian tribunes. After the lex Hortensia in 287 BC endowed the plebeian council with full legislative powers, the two assemblies became practically identical.

=== Plebeian council ===
The plebeian council (Latin: concilium plebis) was one of the popular assemblies of ancient Rome. In the standard conception of the classical republican constitution, it was essentially identical to the tribal assembly except that patricians were excluded and it was presided over mainly by plebeian tribunes. The main legislative assembly in the republic, it also elected the plebeian magistrates (tribunes and aediles) and heard some judicial matters.

It is the modern convention to refer to an assembly of the people, organised by tribe and under the presidency of a plebeian tribune, as a concilium plebis. This was, however, not necessarily the case. Ancient Romans did refer to such assemblies also as comitia tributa, suggesting that the common distinction between comitia and concilium as meetings of the whole and a part of the people respectively may be erroneous modern constructions.

The Romans believed that the council emerged from the Conflict of the Orders, created during a first secession of the plebs traditionally dated to 494 BC. Prior to 471, is not clear how the council was organised. It may have been organised by curiae, if ancient sources are to be believed, but it is more likely that it was undifferentiated, voting instead by head. Throughout the conflict, the plebeian magistrates are said to have fought with the patricians for political equality and the applicability of the plebeian council's decrees (plebiscita) to all Romans. At the close of this process, with the lex Hortensia in 287 BC, it had achieved both.

== Contio ==
The contio (pl. "contiones"; from Latin "conventio" meaning "gathering") was a common type of public meeting in Ancient Rome, which existed during the monarchy as well as in the Roman Republic and Roman Empire. At the contio, magistrates gave informative or persuasive speeches about political matters. Unlike other public assemblies in Rome, such as the comitia, the contio had no procedural role and was not part of the legislative process per se. The contio served a communicative function, offering magistrates the opportunity to give the people a report about a Senate meeting or give a political speech about a piece of proposed legislation (a rogatio) or an upcoming election, so as to persuade citizens to turn out at the assemblies to vote.

Magistrates also used the contio as a means of self-promotion, presenting themselves as defenders of popular interests and thereby seeking to acquire political support. Contiones could also be held during elections to attract support for political candidates. They served both as a persuasive tool as well as an early kind of get out the vote campaign to get supporters to assembly meetings.

A contio could also be held in the context of the military, with a commander convening his troops to address them for various purposes, including informing them of upcoming movements and operations, presenting awards or punishments, or making a motivational speech before a battle. Since senior Roman magistrates all had significant military experience, the customs of the military and political contiones were similar.

== See also ==
- Town meeting

== Bibliography ==
- van der Blom, Henriette (2016). Oratory and Political Career in the Late Roman Republic. Cambridge University Press. doi:10.1017/cbo9781107280281. ISBN 978-1-107-05193-5.
- Cornell, Tim (1995). The Beginnings of Rome. London: Routledge. ISBN 0-415-01596-0. OCLC 31515793.
- Forsythe, Gary (2005). A Critical History of Early Rome. Berkeley: University of California Press. ISBN 978-0-520-94029-1. OCLC 70728478.
- Lomas, Kathryn (2018). The Rise of Rome. History of the Ancient World. Cambridge: Harvard University Press. doi:10.4159/9780674919938. ISBN 978-0-674-65965-0. S2CID 239349186.
- Mouritsen, Henrik (2017). Politics in the Roman Republic. Cambridge University Press. ISBN 978-1-107-03188-3. LCCN 2016047823.
- Lintott, Andrew (1999). Constitution of the Roman Republic. Oxford University Press. ISBN 978-0-19-926108-6. Reprinted 2009.
- Pina Polo, Francisco (1 December 1995). "Procedures and functions of civil and military contiones in Rome". Klio. 77 (1): 203–216. doi:10.1524/klio.1995.77.jg.203. ISSN 2192-7669.
- Tan, James (2008). "Contiones in the age of Cicero". Classical Antiquity. 27 (1): 163–201. doi:10.1525/ca.2008.27.1.163. ISSN 0278-6656.
- Vervaet, Frederik Juliaan (2015). "The "lex curiata" and the patrician auspices". Cahiers du Centre Gustave Glotz. 26: 201–224. ISSN 1016-9008. JSTOR 44945732.
