= Curiate assembly =

First assembly of the people in ancient Rome

The curiate assembly (Latin: comitia curiata) was the oldest of the popular assemblies of Rome. It was organised on the basis of curiae and is said to have been the main legislative and electoral assembly of the regal and early republican periods. Little is known of its origins and early operation.

By the late republic, the curiae only met for limited pro forma purposes related to public religion; the historical thirty curiae were each represented by a single lictor rather than actual groups of citizens. The foremost of these purposes was the lex curiata de imperio, passed as a matter of course in the presence of three augurs, which related to the quality of a curule magistrate's auspices. When it met under the presidency of the pontifex maximus, the assembly was instead called the comitia calata to deal with matters relating to wills and selection of priests.

== Duties and procedure ==
Livy's first pentad describes the comitia curiata as having a role in the election of kings: after the death of the king and the senate's appointment of interreges, an interrex would put forward a candidate to the assembly for its approval. However, suggestions of the curiate assembly's role in the regal period with the passage of public law are speculative.

During the late republic, which provides essentially the only evidence of the comitia curiata's operations, the assembly was retained in a symbolic form for disposition of religious affairs. There were two kinds of curiate assembly which differed only in the presiding magistrate: a formal comitia curiata under one of the curule magistrates and a comitia calata under the pontifex maximus.

A comitia curiata dealt mainly with the passage of the lex curiata de imperio, a law which gave a newly elected magistrate some kind of further authority or legitimacy in their command. Scholars have suggested that it emerged as a mechanism to confirm, for purposes of archaic law, magistrates elected by the newer assemblies. However, by the late republic the passage of such a law was no longer necessary for a magistrate or promagistrate to actually exercise imperium.

It also had authority relating to the ratification of wills. However, by the late republic wills were no longer made by ratification before the curiae. They also had a role in recognising adoptions, which when before the people by law were formally an adrogatio.

The comitia curiata met in the comitium in the Roman Forum, though it is possible that other locations were also acceptable. In the late republic, instead of actually being made up of citizens assigned to curiae, each of the thirty curiae were represented in the assembly by a single lictor. While every citizen was theoretically assigned to a curia – contra Niebuhr and Mommsen there is no evidence that membership in the curiae was limited to patricians – by the late republic it was common for citizens not to know which curia was theirs. It is also likely that laws pertaining to delays between the promulgation of bills and votes on them, such as the lex Caecilia et Didia of 98 BC, did not apply to the curiate assembly.

== History ==
=== Origins ===
The Romans believed that the curiae traced to the earliest times, having been created by the legendary first monarch Romulus and named for the Sabine women. Each set of ten curiae were assigned to one of the ancient Romulean tribes that were said to also date to the founding. Citizens were assigned to their curia by birth, though there is no indication that all the members of curia were actually related. The earliest assignment may have been in reference to geographic divisions in Rome, with each curia having a traditional meeting place and boundaries, as suggested by an etymology deriving curia from co-viria.

Eight curiate names are known: Veliensis, Foriensis, Titia, Faucia, Velitia, Acculeia, Tifata, and Rapta. The last name, Rapta, has been suggested as giving rise to the story of the rape of the Sabine women. Each curia also retained for religious functions a leader called a curio, with a superintending curio maximus.

The sources claim that the curiate assembly had a role in the acclamation of kings, with the lex curiata de imperio serving as a military oath binding the people to royal imperium while the people made noise with their weapons in approval.

=== Obsolescence and influence ===
In the earliest times it is possible that the curiate assembly, like the later centuriate assembly, represented a somewhat confederal people under arms led in peacetime by aristocratic clans. Whether or not this is the case, it is likely that by the fifth century BC the assembly was already functionally obsolete, being superseded by the centuriate assembly attributed to Servius Tullius and the tribal assembly.

There are some indications that the plebeian council was convened in the earliest times by curiae rather than by tribes. But it is more likely that prior to reforms reorganising the council tribally, attributed to Volero Publilius and traditionally dated to 471 BC, people instead voted by head as in most Greek city-state assemblies. Alternatively, the tribunes could have been elected and legislated before unofficial tribal assemblies before securing their ratification by the community as a whole in 471.

More influential, however, was the precedent that the curiate system had on later assemblies. The artificial units or block votes into which each citizen was assigned meant that the Romans viewed "the people" as a collection of these voting blocks rather than as individual citizens, meaning that actual level of participation by citizens was constitutionally irrelevant. This substitution of voting blocks for the actual citizenry was taken to an extreme in the later curiate assembly's ritualistic use of a single lictor to represent each curia.

=== Late republic ===
Operations of the curiate assembly in the late republic, and even for the earlier regal period, were likely not competitive: instead, it was used to ritualistically to establish popular consensus by unanimity. There are a few episodes in the late republic where the formalities of the curiate assembly became relevant.

Its role in recognising adoptions came up in 59 and 43 BC with the adoptions of Publius Clodius Pulcher and Octavian, respectively. A comitia calata met in 59 BC under the pontifex maximus' presidency to ratify the adoption of Publius Clodius Pulcher; it also met in September 43 to make Octavian the adoptive heir of Caesar.

The formalities of confirming elected magistrates' imperium also became relevant in 54 BC when meetings of the curiate assembly were obstructed by veto. What followed was a rather sordid affair where the two consuls, seeking a fabricated lex curiata and good provincial assignments, induced two consular candidates to put up false witnesses to testify as to fictitious meetings of the assembly and senate to that effect. The extent of the scheme shows that the lack of such a law was perceived as important, but the two consuls regardless left to their provinces probably without it. Dio also claims that the republican magistrates driven from Rome by Caesar's civil war claimed lack of a lex curiata also made it impossible for them to create their successors.

== Bibliography ==
=== Modern sources ===
- Broughton, Thomas Robert Shannon (1952). The magistrates of the Roman republic. Vol. 2. New York: American Philological Association.
- Cornell, Tim (1995). The beginnings of Rome. London: Routledge. ISBN 0-415-01596-0. OCLC 31515793.
- Cornell, Tim C (2022). "Roman political assemblies". In Arena, Valentina; Prag, Jonathan (eds.). Companion to the political culture of the Roman republic. Wiley Blackwell. pp. 220–35. ISBN 978-1-119-67365-1. LCCN 2021024437.
- Forsythe, Gary (2005). A critical history of early Rome. Berkeley: University of California Press. ISBN 978-0-520-94029-1. OCLC 70728478.
- Lindsay, Hugh (2009). Adoption in the Roman world. Cambridge University Press. doi:10.1017/CBO9780511657399. ISBN 978-0-511-65739-9.
- Lintott, Andrew (1999). Constitution of the Roman republic. Oxford University Press. ISBN 978-0-19-926108-6. Reprinted 2009.
- Mouritsen, Henrik (2017). Politics in the Roman republic. Cambridge: Cambridge University Press. ISBN 978-1-107-03188-3. OCLC 961266598.
- Ogilvie, R M (1970). Commentary on Livy: Books 1–5 (Reprinted with addenda ed.). Oxford: Clarendon Press. ISBN 0-19-814432-6.
- Rosillo-López, Cristina (2024). "The corrupted speak". In Carlà-Uhink, Filippo; Faber, Eike (eds.). Corruption in the Graeco-Roman world: re-reading the sources. De Gruyter. pp. 47–64. doi:10.1515/9783111339962-003. ISBN 978-3-11-133996-2.
- Tatum, W Jeffrey (1999). The patrician tribune: Publius Clodius Pulcher. Studies in the history of Greece and Rome (Paperback ed.). University of North Carolina Press. ISBN 978-0-8078-7206-2. LCCN 98-37096.
- Vervaet, Frederik Juliaan (2015). "The "lex curiata" and the patrician auspices". Cahiers du centre Gustave Glotz. 26: 201–224. ISSN 1016-9008. JSTOR 44945732.

=== Ancient sources ===
- Cassius Dio. Roman history – via LacusCurtius.
- Cicero. De domo sua [On his house].
- Cicero. De republica [On the republic].
- Cicero. Epistulae ad Atticum [Letters to Atticus].
- Cicero. Epistulae ad familiares [Letters to friends].
- Cicero. Epistulae ad Quintum fratrem [Letters to brother Quintus].
- Gellius. Noctes Atticae [Attic Nights].
- Livy (1905) [1st century AD]. From the founding of the city . Translated by Roberts, Canon – via Wikisource.
